= Beienheim–Schotten railway =

Railway line in Germany

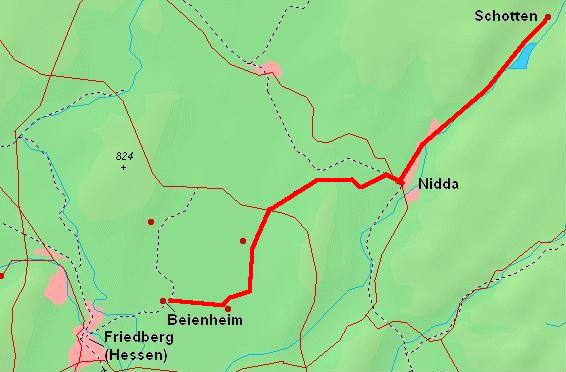

Overview
- Line number: 3741
- Locale: Hesse, Germany

Service
- Route number: 632 (formerly: 193g)

Technical
- Line length: 33.4 km (20.8 mi)
- Track gauge: 1,435 mm (4 ft 8 1/2 in) standard gauge

The Beienheim–Schotten railway is a railway in the Horloff and the Nidda valleys in the Wetteraukreis in the German state of Hesse. Its western section is also called the Horlofftalbahn (Horloff Valley Railway).

It was built as two different sections, which were connected with each other in Nidda station as well as to the Gießen–Gelnhausen railway, which was opened in 1870:

- the section branching from the Friedberg–Mücke railway from Friedberg in Beienheim station (this section of line is also known as the Horloff Valley Railway) and running to Nidda; this was opened in 1897 and is still in operation, and
- the section from Nidda to Schotten, which was in operation from 1888 to 1959.

Since both parts of the line reached Nidda station from the north, trains had to reverse there to continue their journey.

== Route ==
=== Beienheim–Nidda ===
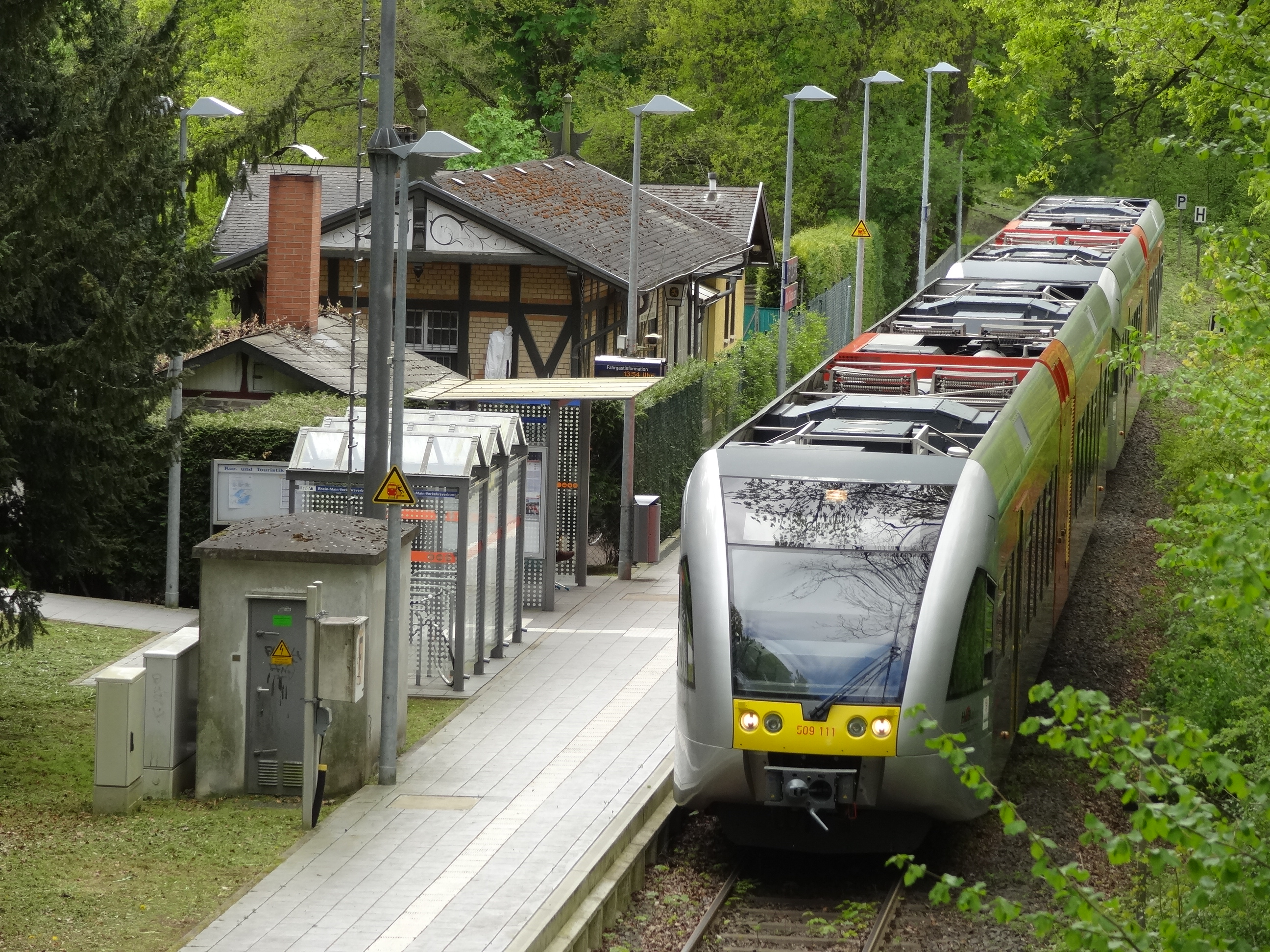
Bad Salzhausen station

The line starts in Beienheim station (in Reichelsheim), where it branches from the Friedberg–Mücke railway (which now runs only as far as Wölfersheim). The line runs as far as Reichelsheim through the village of Weckesheim on the south side of and directly next to Landesstraße (state road) 3186/3187 (Weckesheimer Straße and Bad Nauheimer Straße).

In Reichelsheim it turns north and runs parallel to the Horloff through the municipality of Echzell to the south of the village of Ober-Widdersheim (part of Nidda). The local halt of Häuserhof is only about 750 metres south of the Gießen–Gelnhausen railway, which this line, which is now again running to the east, runs parallel to but at some distance from until the two lines join at Nidda. After stopping in the spa town of Bad Salzhausen, which is part of the municipality of Nidda, a large right turn takes it to Nidda Station. In the course of this curve, the railway from Gießen and the former continuation of the line to Schotten run to its left.

The entire line from Beienheim to Nidda lies in the Wetterau district of Hesse in the municipalities of Reichelsheim and Echzell and in the town of Nidda.

=== Nidda–Schotten ===
The section to Schotten is the older of the two parts. It was opened in 1888, nine years before the section towards Friedberg, but it was closed and dismantled in 1959/60. In order to save costs and because low traffic volumes were already foreseen during its planning, it was built to technically simple standards. So it followed nearly the entire course of the road from Nidda to Schotten along the valley of the river Nidda, now called federal road 455, usually immediately next to it. The railway operated like a tram in the villages, running directly on the very narrow village streets, which was inconvenient for the residents with its steam operations. Although the line passed through centres of the villages, the stations were built on their outskirts because the narrow roads meant there was no room to build them in the centres.

The Schotten line branched off to the east from the Gießen–Gelnhausen railway at the northern end of Nidda station and runs to the west of the main road on the route of today's Kohdener Weg to the Paradiesstraße / Hoherodskopfstraße intersection and continues on the left (west) side of Hoherodskopfstraße through the village of Kohden. The Kohden halt was located near Ulfaer Weg. Outside Kohden the railway changed to the right (east) side of the road. In the following village of Unter-Schmitten, it was possible to build the line parallel with the village street (Brückenstraße/Vogelsbergstraße) instead of directly along it. In the Brückenstraße/Am Storz area the former route is still recognisable as a path. There was a halt on the village's northern edge at the Chausseehaus inn.

The next village of Ober-Schmitten included two paper mills, both of which were connected by sidings to the railway. Again, the line had to run directly through the narrow village street. The halt was at its eastern end near the SPO paper mill. Continuing on the right (southeast) side of the road, the line followed the highway to Eichelsdorf and along the village main street to a halt near the townhouse now called Eichelsdorf.

The railway line between Eichelsdorf and Rainrod moved slightly away from the road and crossed it approximately halfway between the two villages. Part of its course can still be recognised as a path. The line also crossed Rainrod near the main street (Frankfurter Straße), but here the halt was on the eastern outskirts, again on the southern side of the road, east of the junction with Brückenstraße. The line ran on the south side of the highway on what is now the northern shore of the Niddastausee reservoir, which was built after the dismantling of the railway, and ended at its terminus in the town of Schotten. The station was between the Nidda river and the present federal highway in the area of the Taubenweg; its goods shed still exists and is used for commercial purposes.

The villages of Kohden, Unter-Schmitten, Ober-Schmitten and Eichelsdorf are now part of Nidda in Wetteraukreis. Rainrod is in the town of Schotten in Vogelsbergkreis.

== History ==
=== Beienheim–Nidda ===
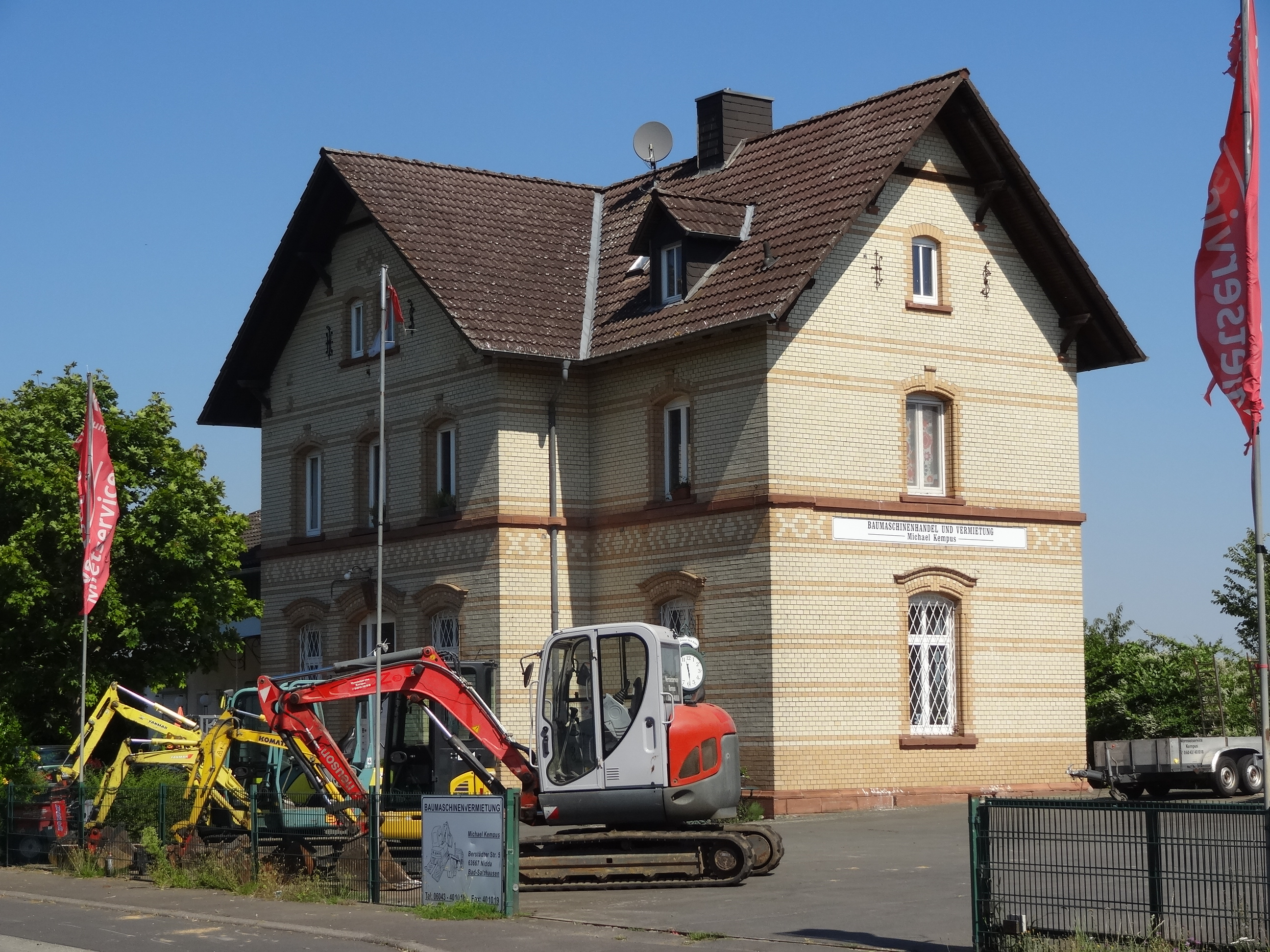
Former Geiß-Nidda station

The line was originally planned and operated by the Grand Duchy of Hesse State Railways (Großherzoglich Hessische Staatseisenbahnen), which was absorbed into the Prussian-Hessian Railway Company (Preußisch-Hessische Eisenbahngemeinschaft) in 1897. Construction started on 20 September 1895. The railway was opened on 1 October 1897. The installation of a second track was planned, but never carried out.

Freight traffic used to be significant and was supported by the agriculture of the Wetterau. Of particular note was the sugar beet traffic to the sugar refinery in Friedberg (until 1982). In addition, lignite was transported from Geiß-Nidda between 1904 and 1949. Also the Wölfersheim power plant and salt production in Bad Salzhausen brought traffic to the railway. From 1982 to 1995, around 120,000 tonnes of waste were loaded every year in Grund-Schwalheim. Two trains a day ran to Friedberg and were shunted there for the onward journey. The line had very dilapidated tracks, which meant that parts of it had speed restrictions of 10 to 30 km/h, requiring modernisation.

=== Nidda–Schotten ===
The Nidda–Schotten was opened on 26 May 1888. Because it ran through narrow village streets, the railway was an obstacle for traffic and an accident risk from the first day, which was no longer considered acceptable with the beginning of mass motorisation in the late 1950s. Passenger operations in Schotten and the adjoining villages were therefore formally closed on 29 November 1959. Freight operations continued until February 1960, when it was also abandoned due to lack of demand. The line was dismantled a few months later.

== Current operations ==
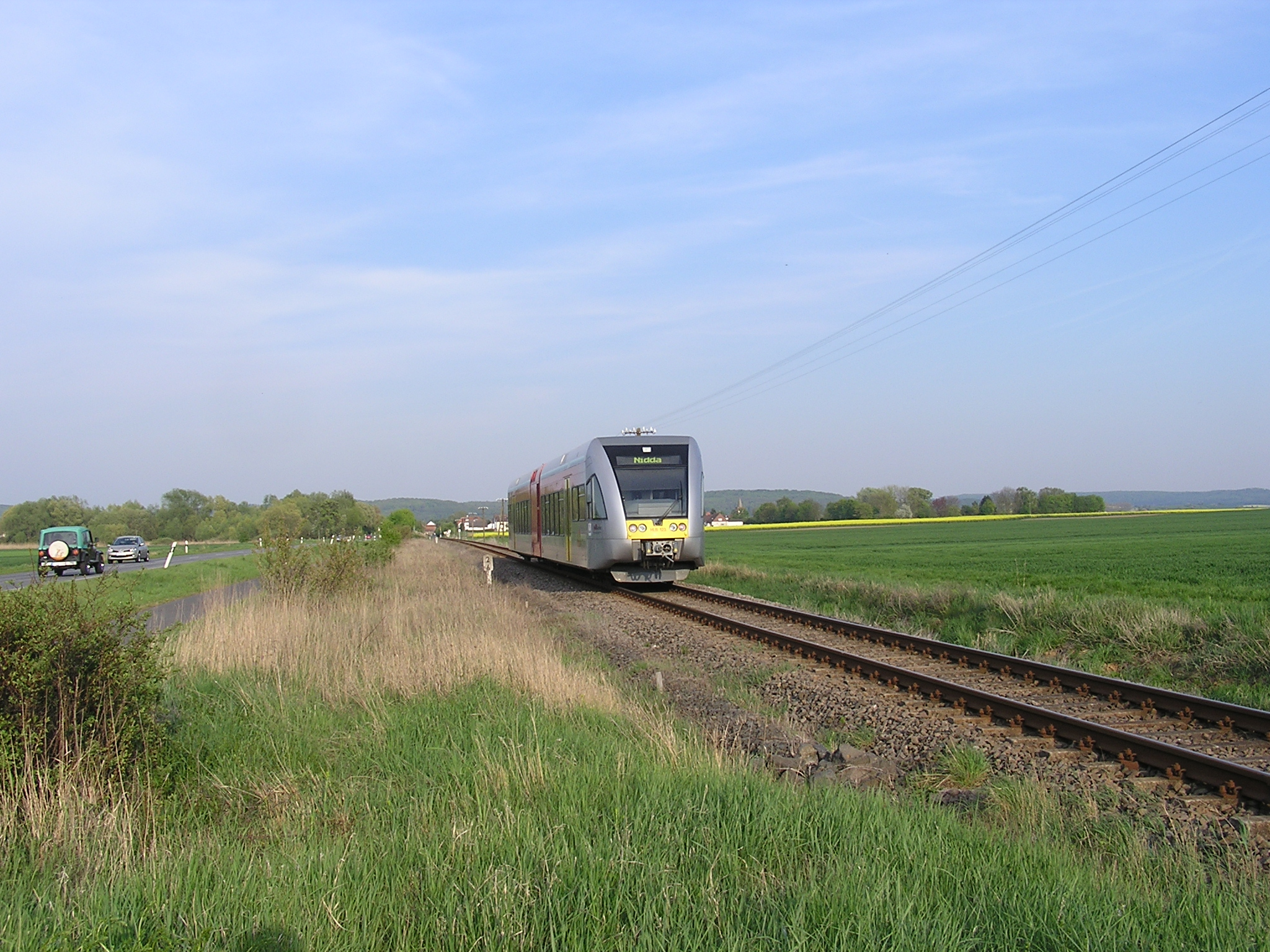
A GTW 2/6 set shortly before Reichelsheim

The line is located in the area managed by the Rhein-Main-Verkehrsverbund (RMV). It is operated by the Butzbach office of the Hessische Landesbahn, (until 2005, a subsidiary of the Butzbach-Lich Railway Company—Butzbach-Licher Eisenbahn). In the peak hour, trains run to/from Frankfurt (Main) Hauptbahnhof. Two of these trains are operated as Regional-Express services by DB Regio Mitte with a Bombardier TRAXX locomotive (class 245) hauling double-decker cars and one train is operated from Friedberg towards Nidda by HLB using coupled GTW 2/6 sets.

Freight traffic plays a minor role as a result of the closure of Wetteraukreis’s waste transhipment point in Grund-Schwalheim and the decline of the wood processing industry in Nidda. However, the Pfleiderer company, which was located in the former Hornitex factory, was still receiving regular deliveries of tank wagons via its siding until its closure in the summer of 2011.
