= Büdingen (Oberhess) station =

Railway station in Hesse, Germany

Büdingen (Oberhess)
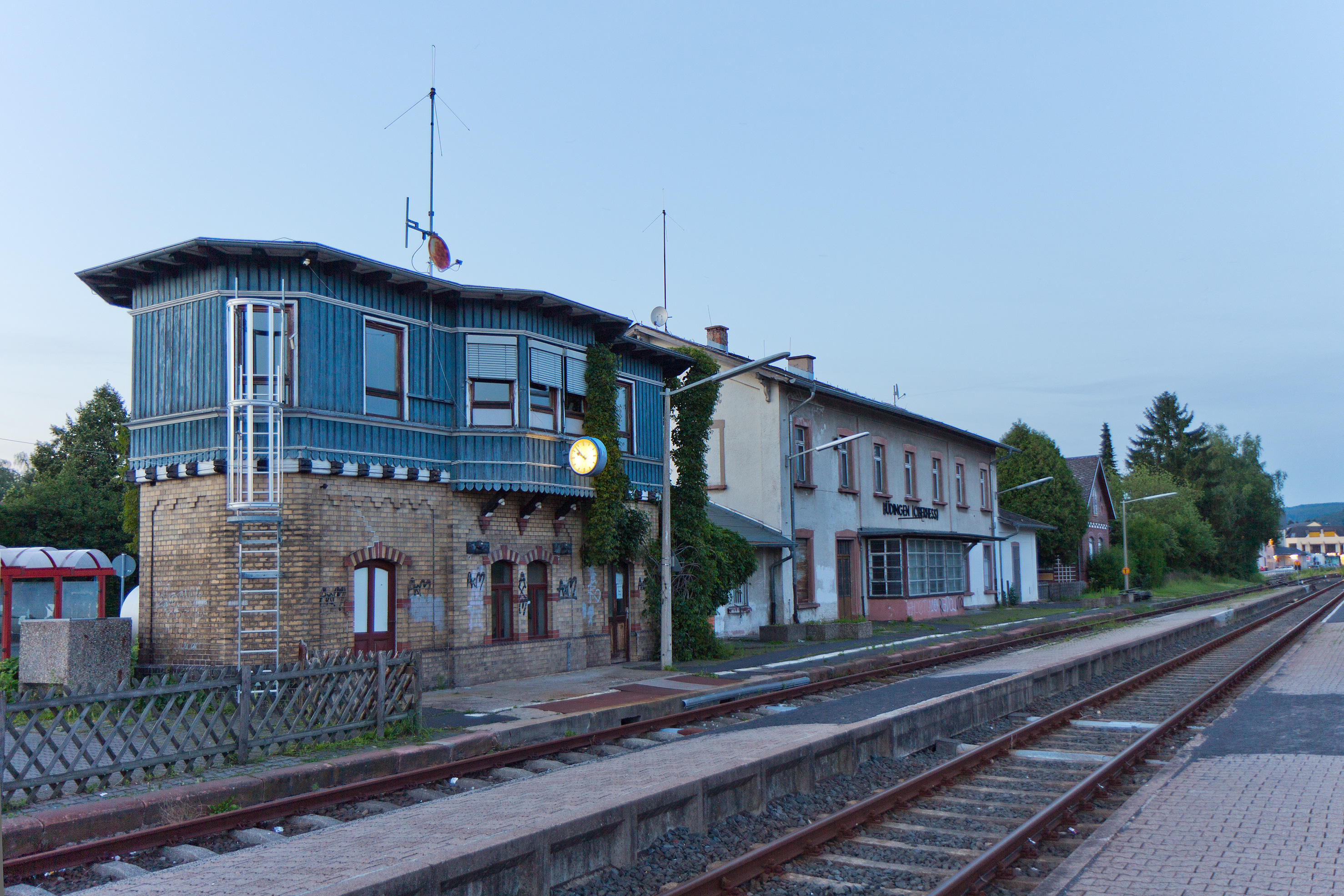
- Former station building

General information
- Location: Bahnhofstraße 70, Büdingen, Hesse; Germany
- Coordinates: 50°17′20″N 9°06′09″E
- Line: Gießen–Gelnhausen railway (54.8 km)
- Platforms: 2

Construction
- Accessible: Yes

Other information
- Station code: 0957
- DS100 code: FBDG
- IBNR: 8001250
- Category: 5
- Fare zone: : 2710
- Website: www.bahnhof.de

History
- Opened: 30 October 1870

Services
Preceding station	Hessische Landesbahn	Following station
Büches-Düdelsheim towards Gießen	RB 46	Mittel-Gründau towards Gelnhausen
Location

Büdingen (Oberhess) station is a station on the Gießen–Gelnhausen railway (also known as the Lahn-Kinzig Railway) in the town of Büdingen in the German state of Hesse. The station is located in the centre of the town. Büches-Düdelsheim station is also located in the municipality, in the district of Büches. The station is classified by Deutsche Bahn (DB) as a category 5 station.

== History ==
The station was opened on 30 October 1870 as the end of the third section of the Lahn Gießen–Gelnhausen railway (Nidda–Büdingen) by the Upper Hessian Railway Company (German: Oberhessische Eisenbahn-Gesellschaft). Exactly a month later, the railway was extended to Gelnhausen.

The entrance hall of the station is now listed as a monument under the Hessian Heritage Act. The station building is now privately owned and is no longer used for rail purposes. The condition has deteriorated and dilapidated.

== Operations ==
Büdingen is served by the RB (Regionalbahn) 46 service of the Hessische Landesbahn (Hessian State Railway, HLB) on the Gießen–Nidda–Glauburg-Stockheim–Gelnhausen route. The “house” platform (platform 1) is used by trains towards Gelnhausen. Track 2 is used by trains towards Nidda or Gießen. The service operates at 60-minute intervals in both directions, but is supplemented by an extra service towards Gelnhausen in the morning peak and after lunch and from Gelnhausen in the evening peak. Gießen can be reached in around 75 minutes by train, and Frankfurt (with a change in Gelnhausen to the RE 50 service) in about an hour.

The Lahn-Kinzig Railway also offers interchanges in Nidda (with RB 32 towards Friedberg or Frankfurt) and in Glauburg-Stockheim (with RE/RB 34 towards Bad Vilbel or Frankfurt).

=== Buses ===
Büdingen station is connected by several bus routes to the surrounding area.
