= Friedberg–Mücke railway =

Railway line in Germany

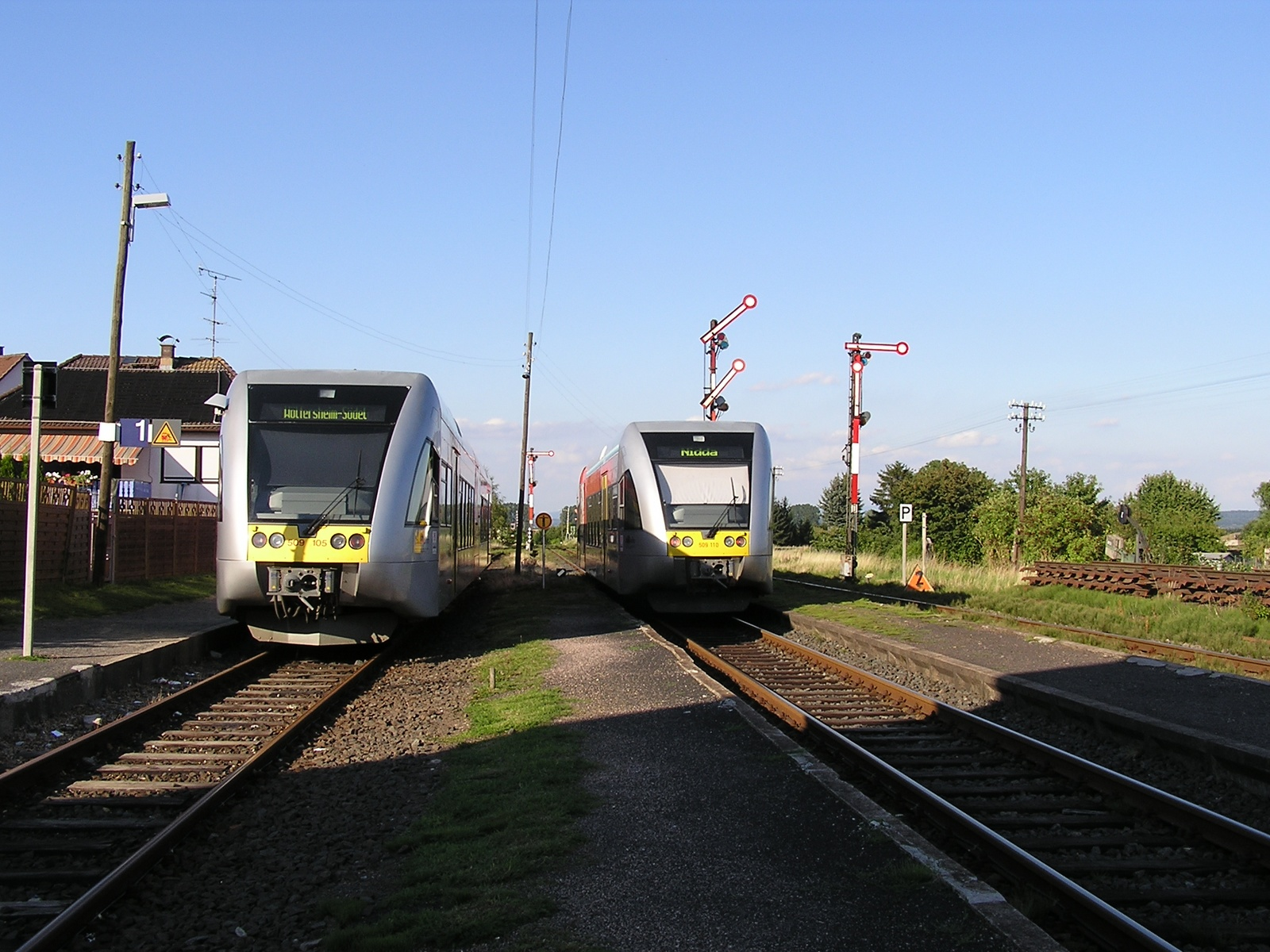
- Trains in Beienheim station

Overview
- Line number: 3740
- Locale: Hesse, Germany

Service
- Route number: 632

Technical
- Line length: 49.2 km (30.6 mi)
- Track gauge: 1,435 mm (4 ft 8 1/2 in) standard gauge

The Friedberg–Mücke railway is a railway that was opened in 1890/97 in the Wetterau and Vogelsberg regions in the German state of Hesse. Sections of the line are also called the Horlofftalbahn (Horloff Valley Railway) and the Seentalbahn (Seen Valley Railway). It originally connected three major railways that run from Giessen, namely:

- the Main–Weser Railway (Frankfurt–Gießen–Kassel),
- the Gießen–Gelnhausen railway,
- and the Vogelsberg Railway (Gießen–Fulda).

Today only the eleven kilometre-long section to Wölfersheim operates as a feeder line to the regional node of Friedberg, where it connects to the rest of the railway network and, importantly for commuters from the Wetterau, Frankfurt.

The Beienheim–Schotten railway, also called the Horlofftalbahn, which branches off in Beienheim to Nidda, opened on the same day and is still operating.

== Sections ==
The line is divided into four sections and a branch line:

Section	Opened	Closed	Length	Notes
Friedberg–Wölfersheim-Södel	1897	Operating	11.2 km	Line RB47 of the Rhein-Main-Verkehrsverbund, operated by the Hessische Landesbahn.
Wölfersheim-Södel–Hungen	1897	2003	12.2 km	Passenger traffic was abandoned on 4 April 2003, while freight traffic had already ended on 31 December 1997. The closure process, which started in the spring of 2004 was interrupted by a contract to preserve the infrastructure. Thus, the line was preserved, but for the time being without a network operator and without an operating license. Reactivation is planned (see #Prospects section).
Hungen–Laubach	1890	1959	12.7 km	Freight traffic was suspended on 31 December 1997. It was closed in 1999 and the tracks were dismantled around 2007. A cycle path was built on the line in the Hungen area in the spring of 2010.
Laubach–Mücke	1890	1958/59	13.1 km	Traffic between Freienseen and Mücke stopped on 31 May 1958, while passenger traffic between Hungen and Freienseen and freight traffic between Laubach and Freienseen were discontinued in 1959. The Laubach–Mücke section, also known as the Seental-Eisenbahn (Seen valley railway), was then closed and dismantled.
Villingen–Friedrichshütte branch line	1896	1959	4.1 km	Originally a narrow-gauge connecting line, mainly for freight to the Friedrichshütte iron foundry. Connection to the main line in Villingen, on the Hungen–Laubach section.

For the Friedberg–Beienheim–Nidda–Schotten line, which was built at the same time, see the Beienheim–Schotten railway article.

== History ==
The line was originally planned and operated by the Grand Duchy of Hesse State Railways (Großherzoglich Hessische Staatseisenbahnen), which was later merged into the Prussian-Hessian Railway Company (Preußisch-Hessische Eisenbahngemeinschaft). The Hungen–Laubach section was opened on 1 June 1890 and the Friedberg–Hungen section was opened on 1 October 1897. The whole line could be operated from 1 November 1903.

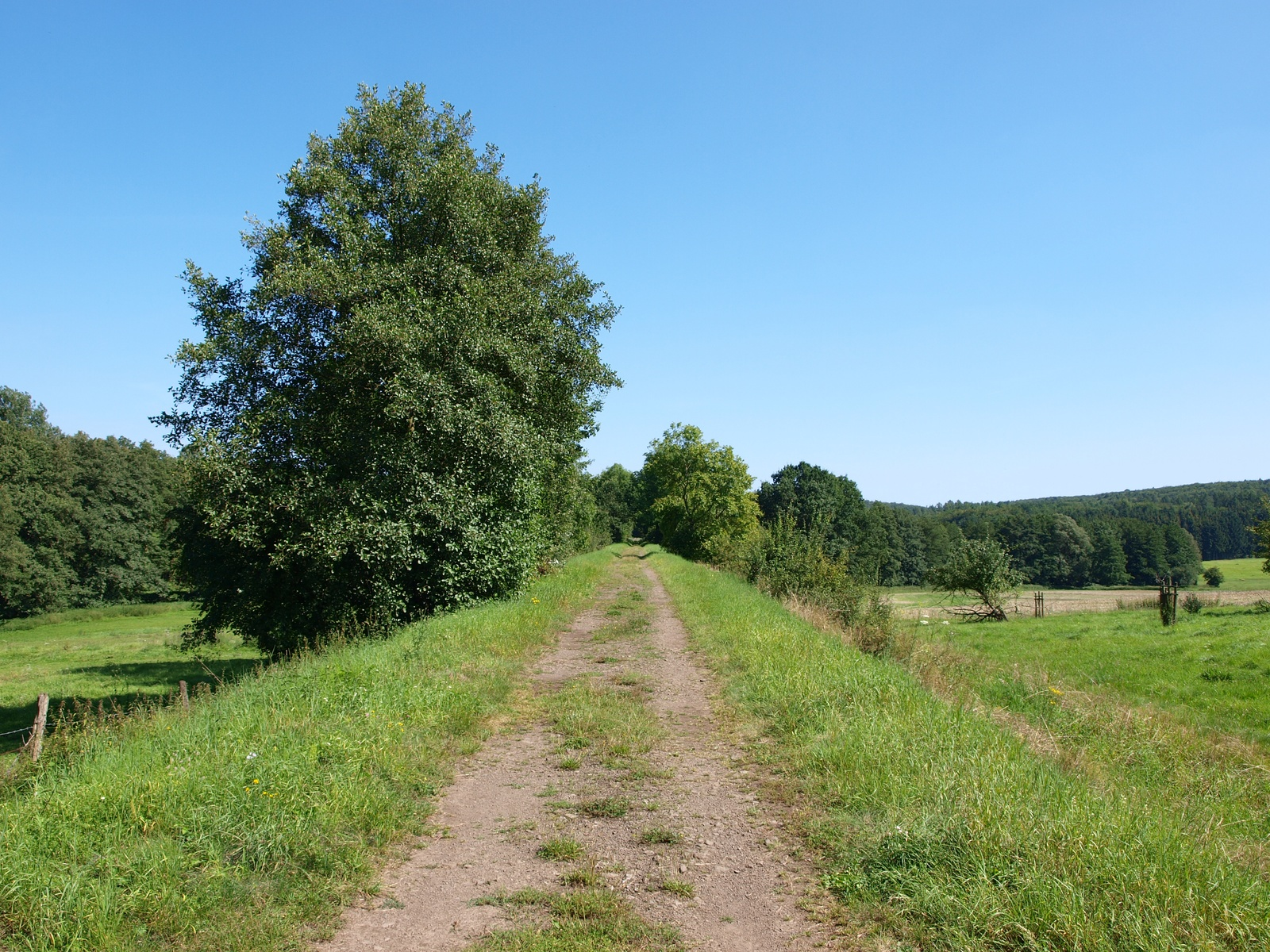
Former line near Laubach

From 1936, the line was to be upgraded to two tracks as a main line. This did not happen, however, because of the outbreak of war. A second tunnel with a length of 196 metres had already been built in the immediate vicinity of the existing Freienseen Tunnel (146 metres).

In 1968, the line between Inheiden and Berstadt-Wohnbach had to be relocated to allow lignite mining. This also caused Obbornhofen-Bellersheim station to be relocated on 9 June 1968. The old line is now dismantled, but still recognisable from the air.

== Villingen–Ruppertsburg–Friedrichshütte branch line ==
The branch line to Ruppertsburg was initially built by the Grand Duchy of Hesse State Railways from Villingen (Oberhessen) station as a narrow gauge horse-hauled line to the Friedrichshütte iron foundry and later rebuilt under Prussian direction as standard gauge. This conversion went into operation on 1 April 1896. The line was used for the carriage of freight and employees for the Friedrichshütte foundry, but it never used for public transport. The branch line was closed in 1959.

== Route ==
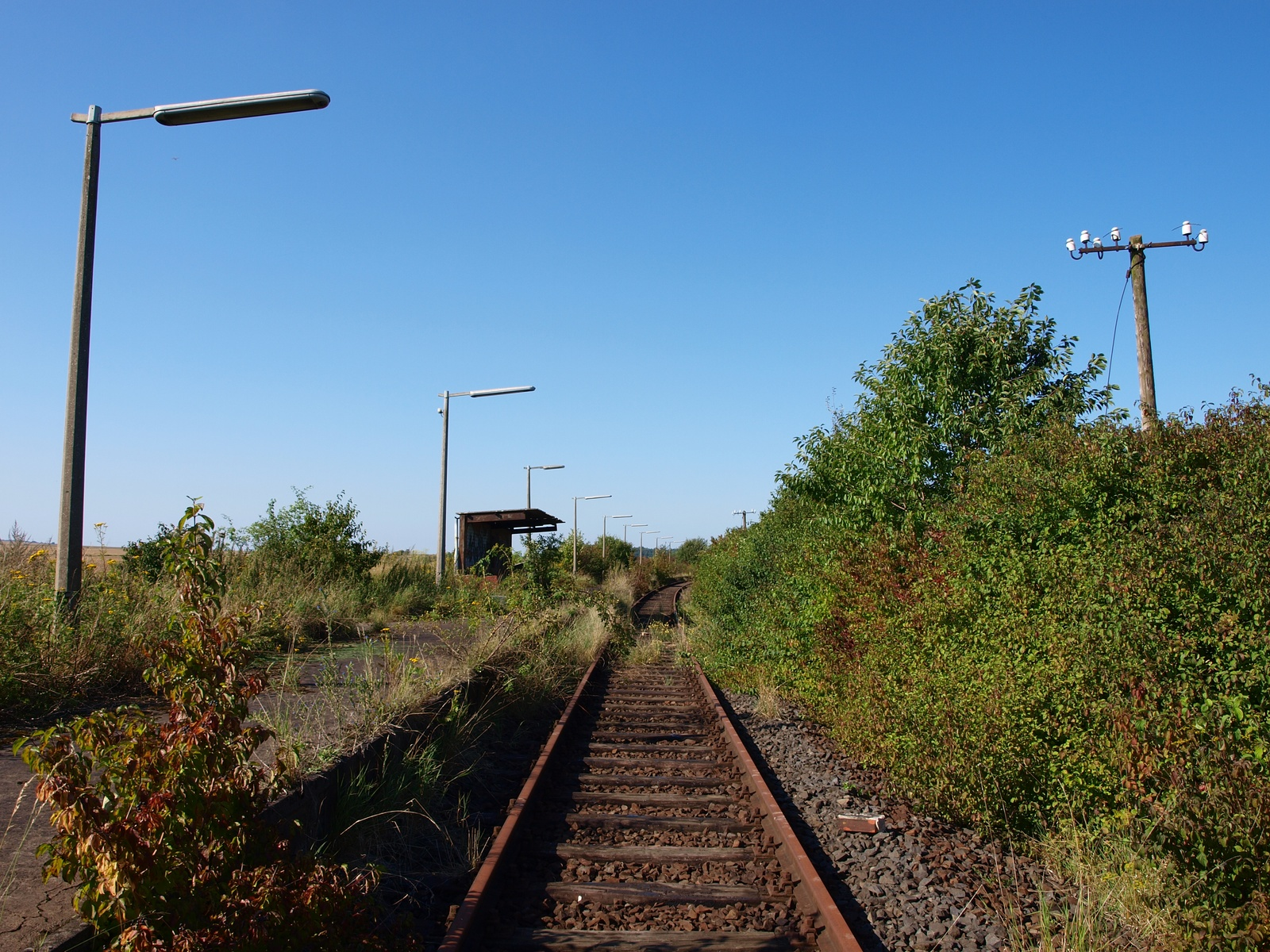
The halt of Obbornhofen-Bellersheim on the section disused since 2003

The route is now only in operation from Friedberg to Wölfersheim-Södel. The trains continued to Hungen until 2003 and to Mücke via the Vogelsberg until 1958/59. It was possible to transfer to the line to Nidda in Beienheim.

Originally, the tracks of Laubach station were on the eastern side of the road. When the line was extended to Mücke the track infrastructure was relocated to the other side of the station and only a loading track was preserved on the eastern side of the road. The station had a two-story entrance building with a goods shed as an annex. The station building is currently (as of 2011) used by a youth centre.

== Operations ==
The line is in the area of the Rhein-Main-Verkehrsverbund (Rhine-Main transport association, RMV). Until the 2004/2005 timetable change, public transport services on the two branches of the line were operated by the Butzbach-Lich Railway Company; since the 2005/2006 timetable change services have been operated by Hessische Landesbahn, its parent company. In the peak hour, trains on the line run to and from Friedberg. In the 2012 timetable, seven train pairs a day ran between Beienheim and Wölfersheim-Södel and nine train pairs between Friedberg and Wölfersheim-Södel from Monday to Friday.

There are hardly any freight operations left.

== Prospects ==
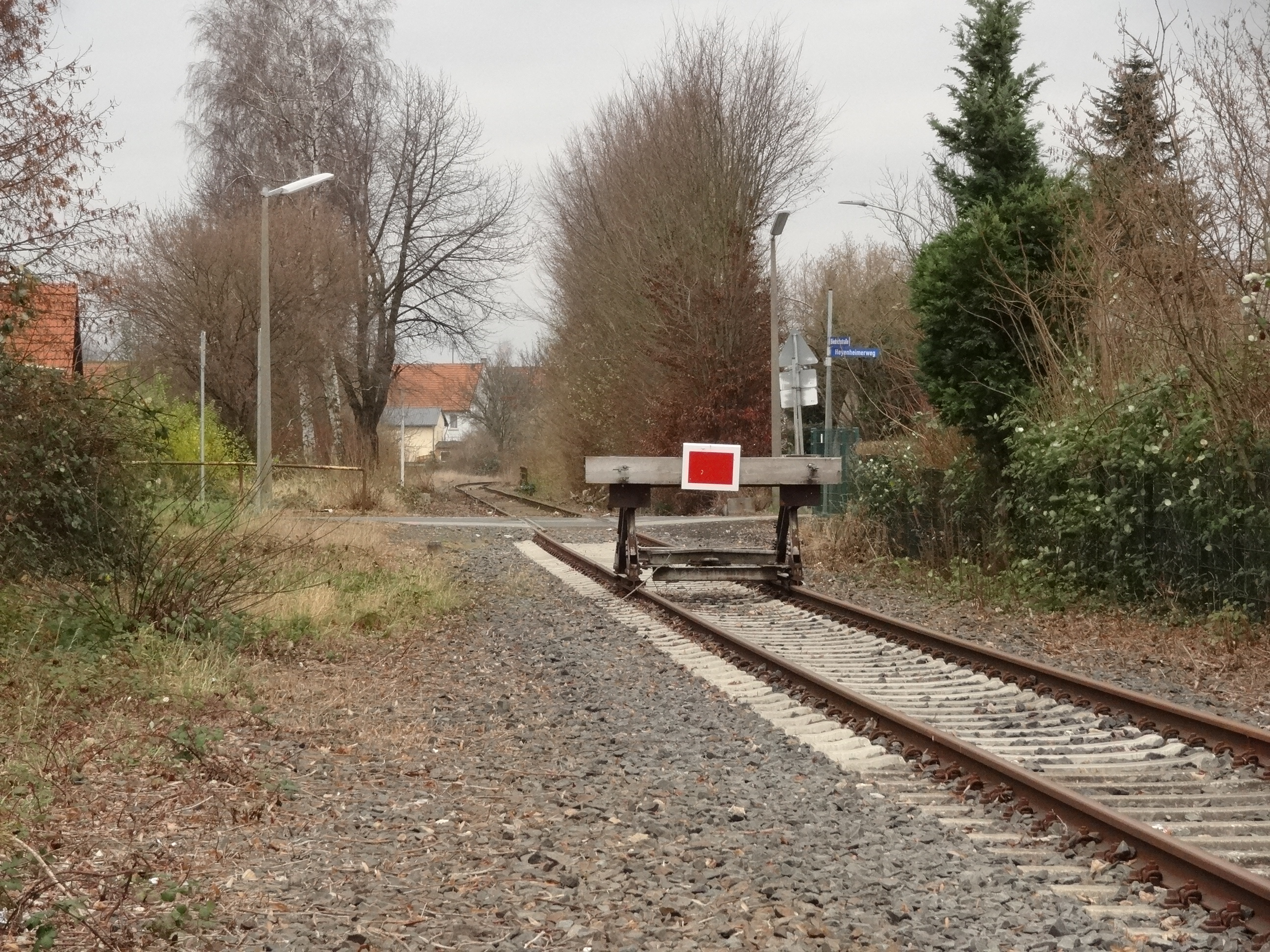
Buffer stop in Wölfersheim-Södel

There are plans to reactivate the decommissioned Wölfersheim-Hungen section. The tracks are complete and apart from minor weathering still in relatively good condition. Despite the blockage of the line at the termini, the signal technology was still in operation; for example, the Wölfersheim semaphore signals were still actively lit until Wölfersheim was rebuilt into a halt in 2008. Nevertheless, at many of the already neglected level crossings, the safety technology and tracks would have to be fundamentally renewed or relocated.
