= Beienheim station =

Railway station in Reichelsheim, Germany

Beienheim
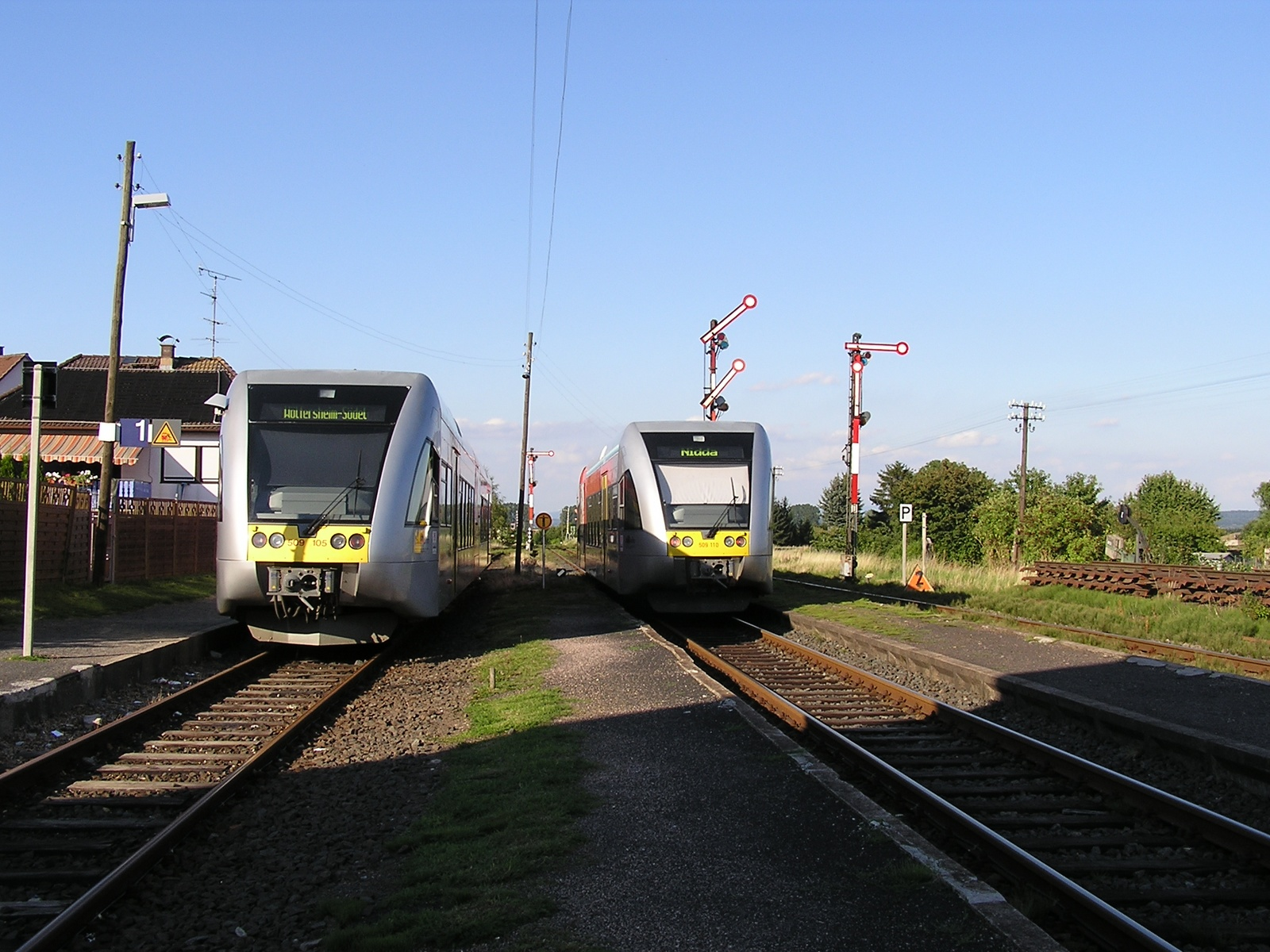
- Platforms

General information
- Location: Bahnhofstr. 14, Beienheim, Hesse; Germany
- Coordinates: 50°21′33″N 8°49′16″E
- Lines: Beienheim–Schotten (km 0.0); Friedberg–Mücke (km 6.2)
- Platforms: 3

Construction
- Accessible: Yes

Other information
- Station code: 464
- DS100 code: FBEI
- IBNR: 8000851
- Category: 5
- Fare zone: : 2540
- Website: www.bahnhof.de

History
- Opened: 1 October 1897

Services
Preceding station	Hessische Landesbahn	Following station
Dorheim (Wetterau) towards Friedberg (Hess)	RB 47	Melbach towards Wölfersheim-Södel
Dorheim (Wetterau) towards Friedberg (Hess)	RB 48	Weckesheim towards Nidda
Location
- Location within Hesse

Beienheim station is a junction station in the Reichelsheim (Wetterau) suburb of Beienheim in the German state of Hesse. It is located on the outskirts of Beienheim.

== History ==
=== Entrance building ===
The entrance building was opened in about 1900 on the Beienheim–Schotten and the Friedberg–Mücke railways, which were opened in 1897. There is a service room in the building, but there is no waiting room. Beienheim, along with Nidda, has a mechanical signal box.

=== Tracks and platforms ===
Beienheim station has three platform tracks. From the main platform on track 1, the trains run on the remaining Friedberg–Wölfersheim-Södel section of the Friedberg–Mücke railway, which once ran through the Vogelsberg to Mücke. The trains of the Beienheim–Schotten railway run to Nidda and Friedberg from tracks 2 and 3, which have low platforms.

== Services ==
Beienheim station has been a railway junction in the Wetterau since its opening in 1897. In the past, it was possible to travel from Beienheim via Wölfersheim, Hungen and Laubach to Mücke, where there was a connection to the Vogelsberg Railway, which is still operating. In 1958 it was still possible to run to Freienseen, in 1959 to Hungen, but since 2003 only to Wölfersheim-Södel.

It was also possible to travel by train from Beienheim to Schotten. Passenger services on the Nidda–Schotten section were closed on 29 November 1959. Since then it has only been possible to travel to Nidda.

A number of regional bus services stop at the station. There is also a park and ride facility.
