= Hungen station =

Train station in Hesse, Germany

Hungen
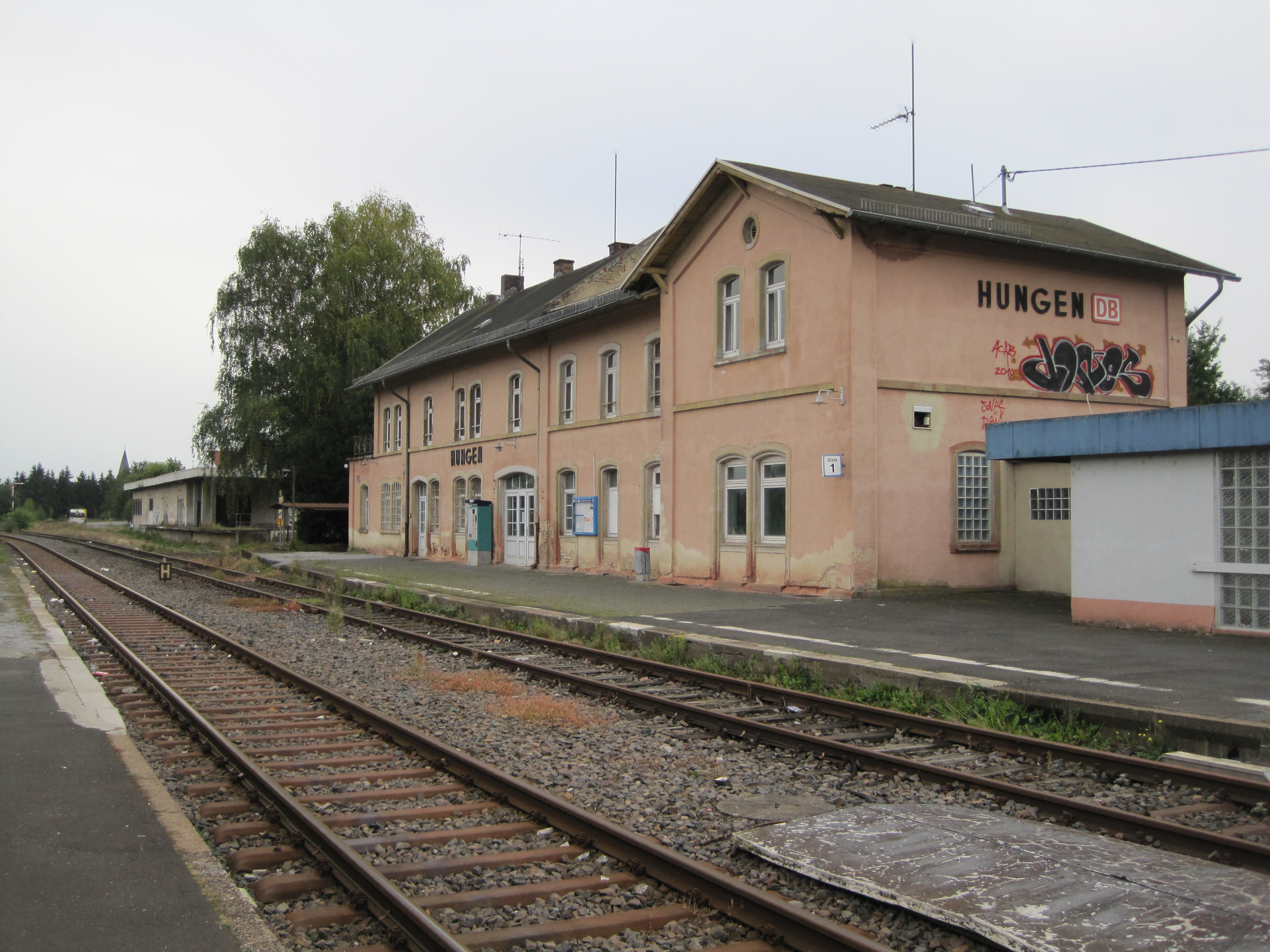
- Tracks and station building in September 2010

General information
- Location: Raiffeisenstr. 7, Hungen, Hesse; Germany
- Coordinates: 50°28′41″N 8°53′34″E
- Lines: Gießen–Gelnhausen railway (km 21.8); Friedberg–Mücke railway (km 23.37) (closed)
- Platforms: 3

Construction
- Accessible: Yes

Other information
- Station code: 2950
- DS100 code: FHUN
- IBNR: 8000347
- Category: 6
- Fare zone: : 1417
- Website: www.bahnhof.de

History
- Opened: 29 December 1869

Services
Preceding station	Hessische Landesbahn	Following station
Langsdorf (Oberhess) towards Gießen	RB 46	Trais-Horloff towards Gelnhausen
Location

Hungen station is a station on the Gießen–Gelnhausen railway (also known as the Lahn-Kinzig Railway) in the town of Hungen in the German state of Hesse. From 1 June 1890 to 4 April 2003, the Friedberg–Mücke railway (also known as the Horloff Valley Railway, German: Horlofftalbahn) branched off to Mücke via Laubach and to Friedberg via Wölfersheim and Beienheim. The station is classified by Deutsche Bahn (DB) as a category 6 station.

== History ==
The first section of the Gießen–Gelnhausen railway (Hungen–Gießen) was opened on 29 December 1869 and Hungen station went into operation. On 29 June 1870, the Gießen–Gelnhausen railway was extended to Nidda station and Hungen became a through station.

The Hungen–Laubach section of the Horloff Valley Railway was opened on 1 June 1890 and the Friedberg–Hungen section was opened on 1 October 1897. The whole line from Friedberg to Mücke was open to traffic on 1 November 1903, making the station into a junction station on the Gießen–Gelnhausen and the Horloff Valley Railway. On 31 May 1959, passenger services was abandoned on the Hungen–Laubach section. Freight traffic was abandoned on this section on 31 December 1997 and it was closed in 1999. The tracks were dismantled around 2007. In the spring of 2010 a bike path was opened on the old railway line in the Hungen district.

Passenger traffic on the Wölfersheim-Södel–Hungen section ended on 4 April 2003. Freight traffic had already been abandoned on 31 December 1997.

== Infrastructure ==
The platforms have not been made accessible for the disabled. The listed station building is owned by the town of Hungen and is scheduled to be completely renovated, starting in 2016 and to be completed in 2018.

== Operations ==
The station is located in the area of the Rhein-Main-Verkehrsverbund (Rhine-Main Transport Association, RMV).

=== Rail ===
Hungen station has not been a railway junction since the abandonment of passenger traffic on the Friedberg–Mücke railway. Services on the Gießen–Gelnhausen railway are operated by Hessische Landesbahn (Hessian State Railway, HLB) with GTW 2/6 sets at hourly intervals between Gießen and Gelnhausen. In the morning peak and after lunch an extra service runs to Gießen and after lunch and in the evening peak an extra service runs from Gießen.

=== Buses ===
There are several bus stops at the station. Bus route 363 runs from here to nearby cities, towns and villages along the disused Friedberg–Mücke railway. Another bus route is route 375, which provides a direct connection to Gießen via Lich and the municipality of Pohlheim (along the Gießen–Gelnhausen railway).

== Future ==
There are concrete plans to reactivate the disused Wölfersheim-Södel–Hungen section. In July 2010, negotiations began for the sale of the railway line by Deutsche Bahn to the local communities.
