= Bad Salzhausen station =

Railway station in Nidda, Germany

Bad Salzhausen
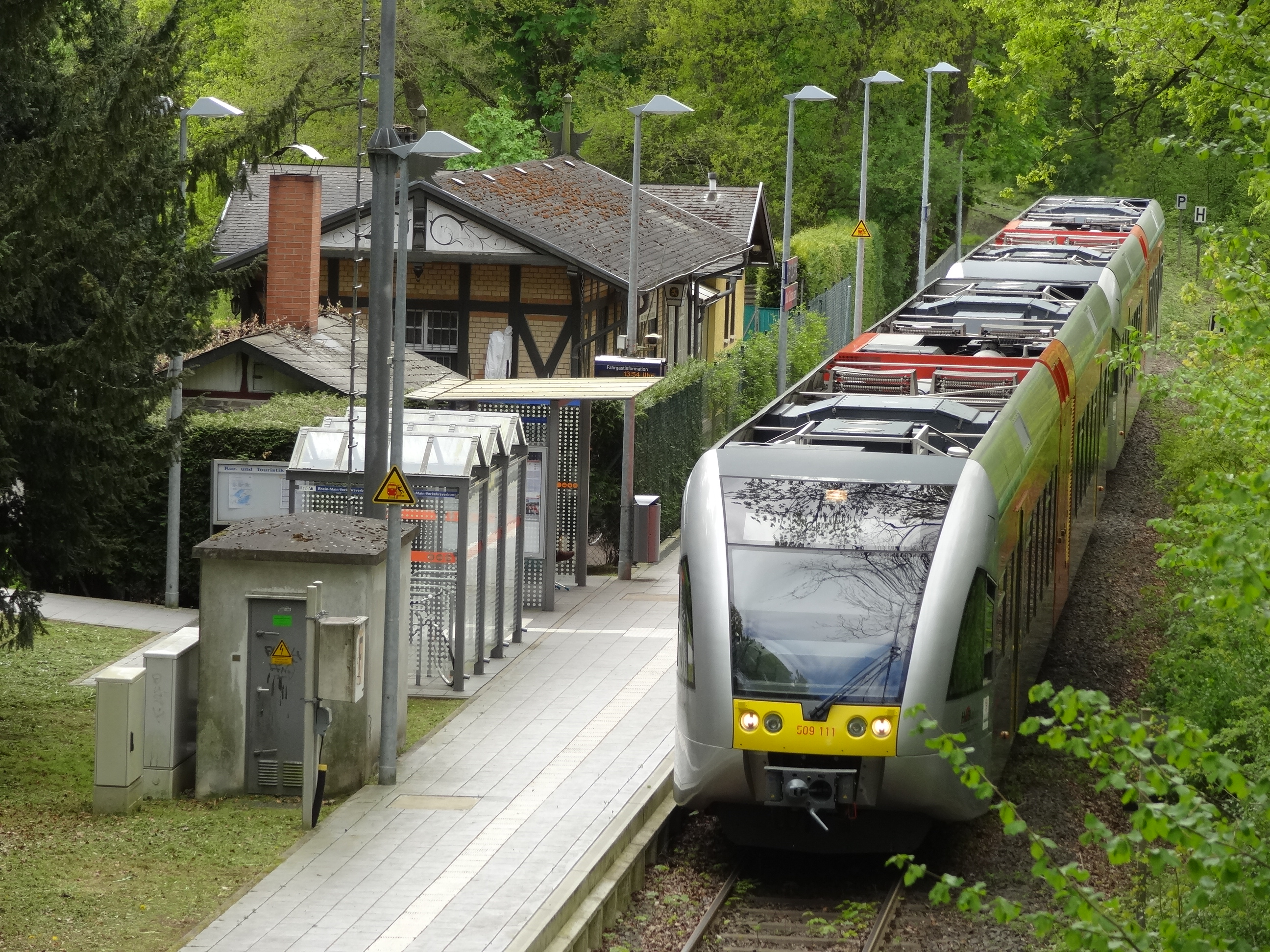

General information
- Location: Im Park 3; 63667 Nidda; Hesse; Germany
- Coordinates: 50.4189°N 8.9803°E
- Owner: DB Netz
- Operator: DB Station&Service
- Line: Beienheim–Schotten railway
- Platforms: 1 side platform
- Tracks: 1
- Train operators: Hessische Landesbahn

Other information
- Station code: 329
- DS100 code: FBSH
- IBNR: 8000741
- Category: 6
- Fare zone: : 2324
- Website: www.bahnhof.de

Services
| Preceding station | Hessische Landesbahn | Following station |
|---|---|---|
| Häuserhof towards Friedberg (Hess) | RB 48 | Nidda Terminus |
Location
- Location within Hesse

Bad Salzhausen station is a railway station in the Bad Salzhausen district of Nidda, located in the Wetteraukreis district in Hesse, Germany.
