= Reichelsheim =

Reichelsheim is the name of two communes in Hesse, Germany

- Reichelsheim (Wetterau)
- Reichelsheim (Odenwald)
