= Horloff =

River in Germany

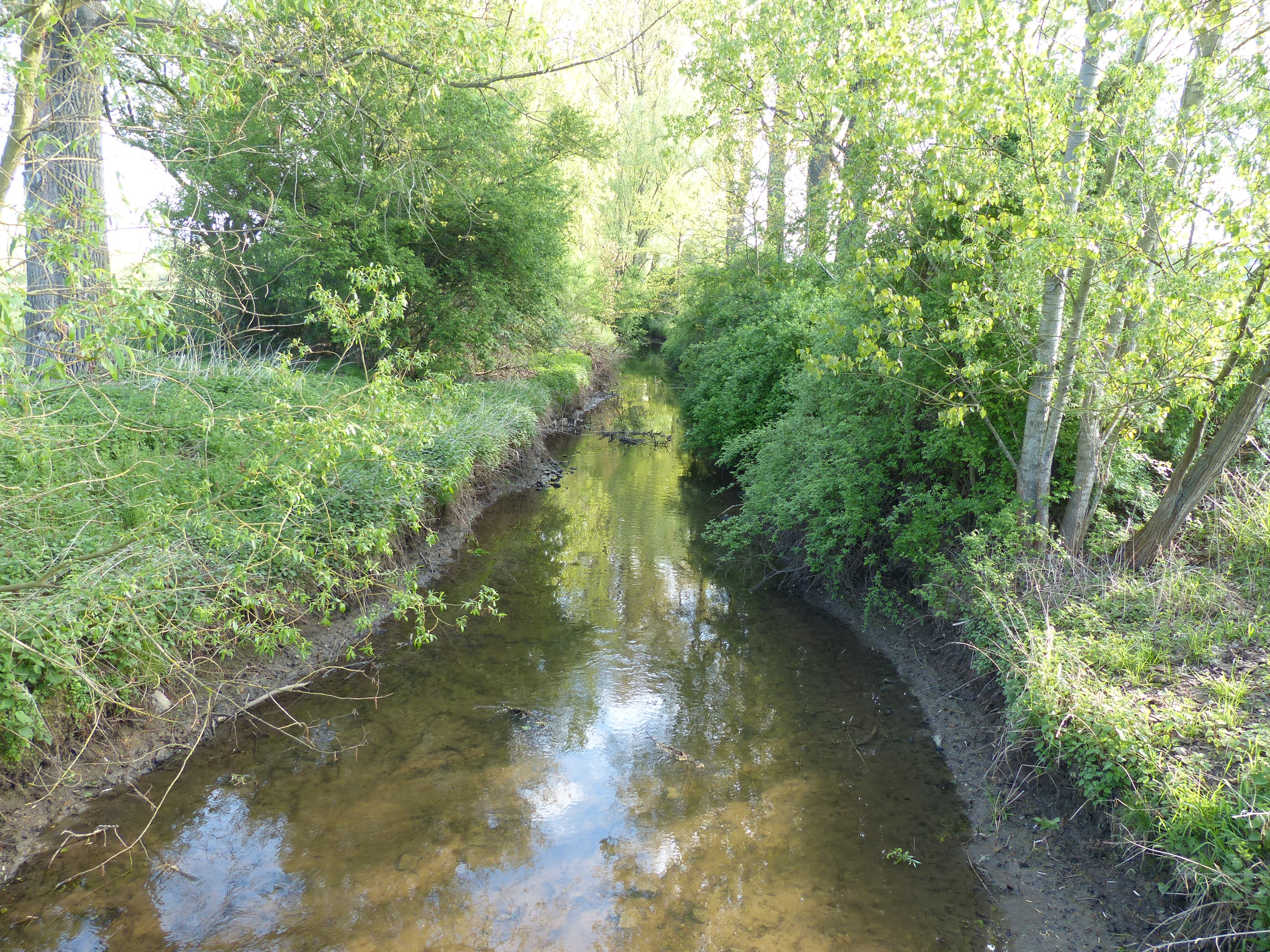
- Horloff west of Utphe, district of Hungen

Location
- Country: Germany
- State: Hesse

Physical characteristics
- Mouth
  - location: Nidda
  - coordinates: 50.3281°N 8.8681°E
- Length: 44.5 km (27.7 mi)
- Basin size: 279 km^{2} (108 sq mi)

Basin features
- Progression: Nidda→ Main→ Rhine→ North Sea

The Horloff is a river of Hesse, Germany. This 44.5 km long river passes through Hungen and Reichelsheim, and flows into the Nidda on the right bank in Florstadt.

== See also ==
- List of rivers of Hesse
