= Langenselbold station =

Railway station in Hesse, Germany

Langenselbold
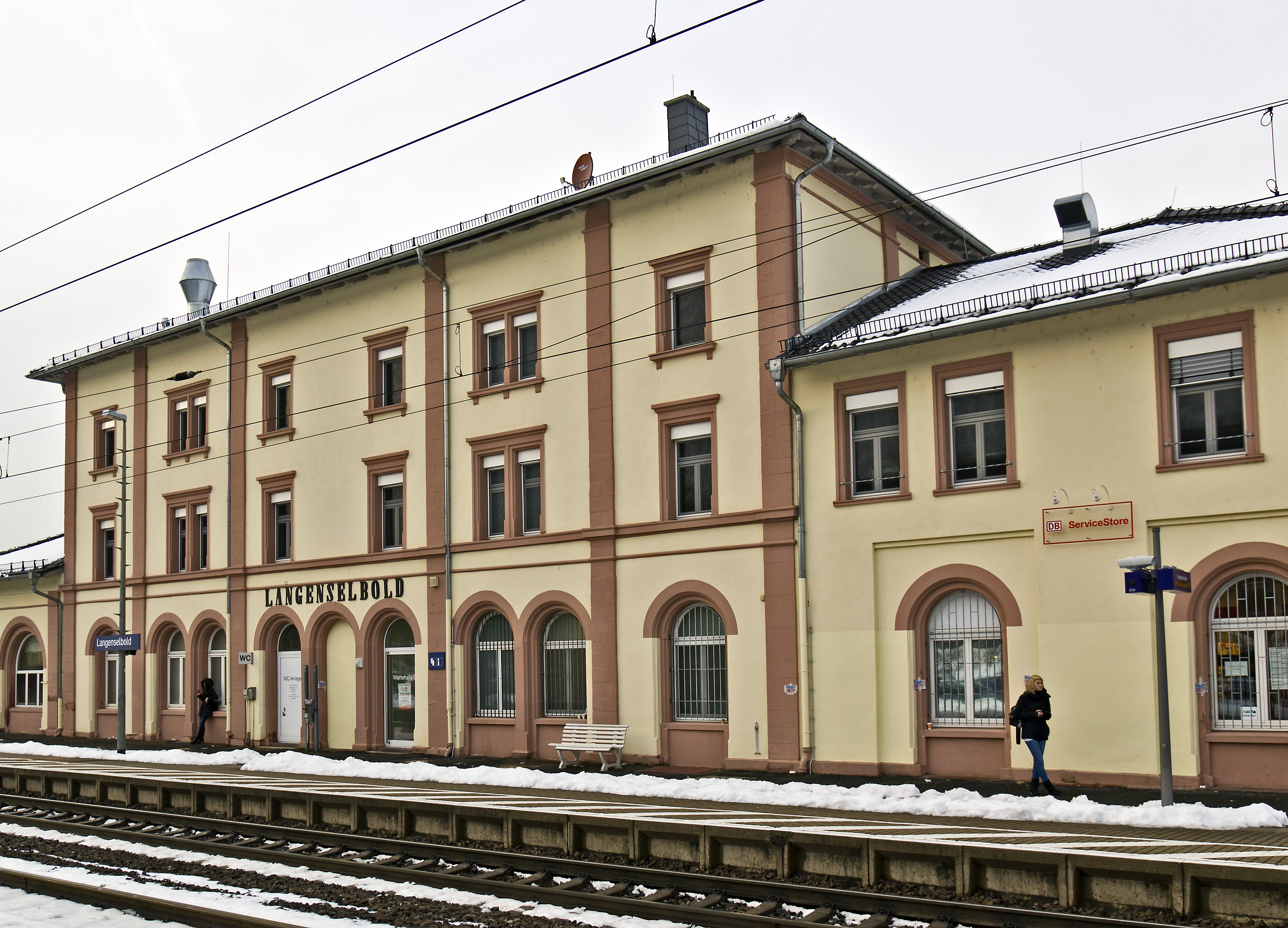

General information
- Location: Am Bahnhof 1, Langenselbold, Hesse; Germany
- Coordinates: 50°09′43″N 9°03′26″E
- Lines: Fulda–Frankfurt (km 33.9); Former Gelnhausen–Langenselbold (km 20.0)
- Platforms: 3

Construction
- Accessible: Yes
- Architect: Julius Eugen Ruhl
- Architectural style: Neoclassical

Other information
- Station code: 3550
- DS100 code: FSLB
- IBNR: 8003550
- Category: 4
- Fare zone: : 3110
- Website: www.bahnhof.de

History
- Opened: 1 May 1867

Services
Preceding station	DB Regio Mitte	Following station
Hanau Hbf towards Frankfurt (Main) Hbf	RE 50	Gelnhausen towards Bebra
Rodenbach towards Frankfurt (Main) Hbf	RB 51	Niedermittlau towards Wächtersbach
Location

Langenselbold station is a station in the town of Langenselbold in the German state of Hesse on the Frankfurt–Göttingen railway. The station is classified by Deutsche Bahn (DB) as a category 4 station.

== History ==
Langenselbold station was opened on 1 May 1867 along with the Hanau–Waechtersbach section of the Frankfurt–Bebra railway.

== Entrance building ==
The entrance building is asymmetric and was built in 1868 in the neoclassical style. It is therefore one of the line's "first generation" buildings. However, it has changed in its appearance: both the original two-storey main building and the eastern wing, formerly a single-storey row of restaurants, were later raised by one storey. The original structure is presumably based on a design by Julius Eugen Ruhl. The entrance building is listed as a monument under the Hessian Heritage Act.

== Operations ==
The station has a “home” platform (next to the station building) and an island platform. The line between Wolfgang and Gelnhausen is cleared for operations at 200 km/h, so that long-distance trains run through the station at high speed. Langenselbold station is now only served by local and regional services and has significance for commuter traffic to and from the Rhine-Main area.

From 1904 to 1963, Langenselbold station was served by the standard gauge Freigericht Light Railway of the Gelnhausen District Railway. The Gelnhausen District Railway had its own entrance building and separate facilities east of the "state” station. The Hanau Light Railway (Hanauer Kleinbahn) also ran between Hanau and Langenselbold, but operated from its own station in Langenselbold, which was significantly closer to central Langenselbold than the "state” station.
