= Nidda station =

Railway station in Nidda, Germany

Nidda
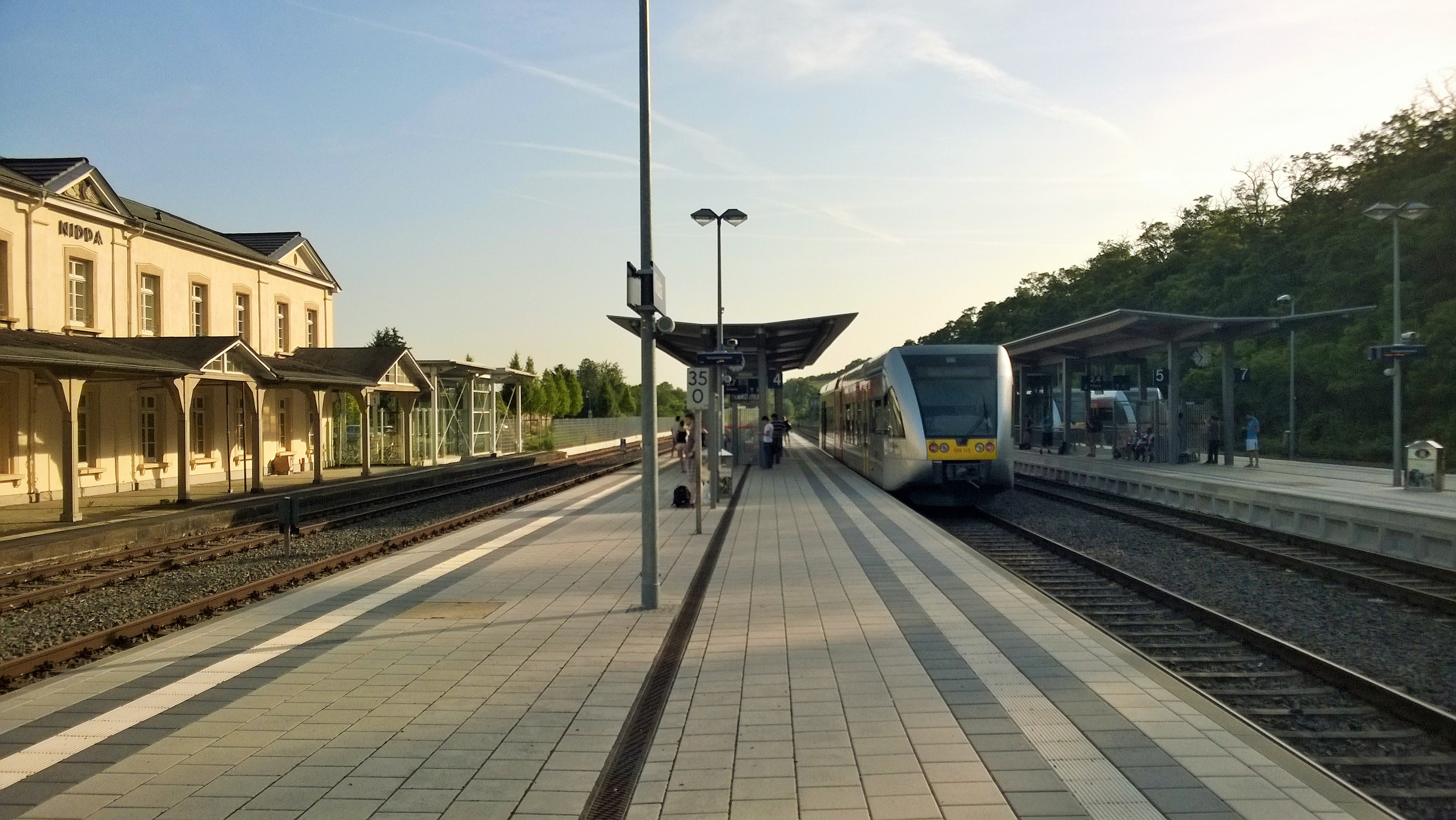

General information
- Location: Bahnhofstr. 62, Nidda, Hesse; Germany
- Coordinates: 50°24′40″N 8°59′57″E
- Lines: Gießen–Gelnhausen railway (35.0 km); Beienheim–Schotten railway (19.2 km)
- Platforms: 5

Construction
- Accessible: Yes

Other information
- Station code: 4471
- DS100 code: FND
- IBNR: 8000277
- Category: 4
- Fare zone: : 2324
- Website: www.bahnhof.de

History
- Opened: 29 June 1870

Services
| Preceding station | Hessische Landesbahn | Following station |
|---|---|---|
| Bad Salzhausen towards Gießen | RB 46 | Terminus |
| Borsdorf towards Friedberg (Hess) | RB 48 | Terminus |
Location
- Location within Hesse

Nidda station is a station on the Gießen–Gelnhausen railway in the town of Nidda in the German state of Hesse. It is also at the end of the Beienheim–Schotten railway from Friedberg station. The station is classified by Deutsche Bahn (DB) as a category 4 station.

== History ==
The station was opened on 29 June 1870 with the opening of the end of the second section of the Gießen–Gelnhausen railway (Hungen–Nidda) by the Upper Hessian Railway Company (German: Oberhessische Eisenbahn-Gesellschaft). At the end of November 1870, the line was extended to Gelnhausen. On 1 October 1897, the Beienheim–Schotten railway was opened from Beienheim via Nidda to Schotten. This made Nidda a major railway junction of the Wetterau.

On 29 November 1959, passenger services on the Nidda–Schotten section were abandoned. Freight still operated until February 1960, when it was closed due to lack of demand. Its track was dismantled a few months afterwards.

The station (except the “house” platform, platform 1) was fully modernised in 2008 and 2009. The platforms on tracks 2 and 4 and on tracks 5 and 7 were renewed and raised to a uniform height of 55 centimetres.

== Infrastructure ==
The Nidda station precinct covers a large area. In addition to the numerous parked railcars of the Butzbach-Lich Railway Company (Butzbach-Licher Eisenbahn, BLE), which operated services here until 2005, loading sidings, an engine shed and the industrial sidings of a chemical plant are spread over a large area in the southern part of the precinct.

=== Entrance building ===
The entrance building is protected as a monument under the Hessian Heritage Act.

== Operations ==
Services on weekends and public holidays were restored on the Gießen–Gelnhausen line at the timetable change on 14 December 2003.

Operations on the Beienheim–Schotten railway were managed by the Butzbach-Lich Railway Company until the timetable change of 2004/2005. Since the timetable change of 2005/2006, it has been operated by the Hessische Landesbahn (Hessian State Railway, HLB), the parent company of the Butzbach-Lich Railway Company.

Although the station is unstaffed now, there is a lot of traffic when the trains to and from Gelnhausen, Giessen and Friedberg meet and allow mutual transfers. Trains depart from platform 2 towards Giessen, from track 4 towards Gelnhausen and from tracks 5 and 7 towards Friedberg. Track 1 formerly served trains towards Schotten.

=== Current services ===
HLB operates trains every hour on the Gießen–Gelnhausen railway between Gießen and Gelnhausen using GTW 2/6 sets. In the morning peak and after lunch an extra service runs to both Gießen and Gelnhausen, and in the evening peak an extra service runs from Gießen.

On the Beienheim–Schotten railway, service runs every hour via Echzell, Reichelsheim and Beienheim to Friedberg. During peak hours there are direct through services to and from Frankfurt Hauptbahnhof. Two of these Stadt-Express (SE) services are operated by DB Regio with a class 218 locomotive hauling refurbished Silberling carriages. One SE service and the Regionalbahn services to and from Friedberg are operated by HLB using GTW 2/6 sets.

Nidda station is served by some regional and city bus routes.
