= Bruchenbrücken station =

Railway station in Friedberg, Germany

Bruchenbrücken
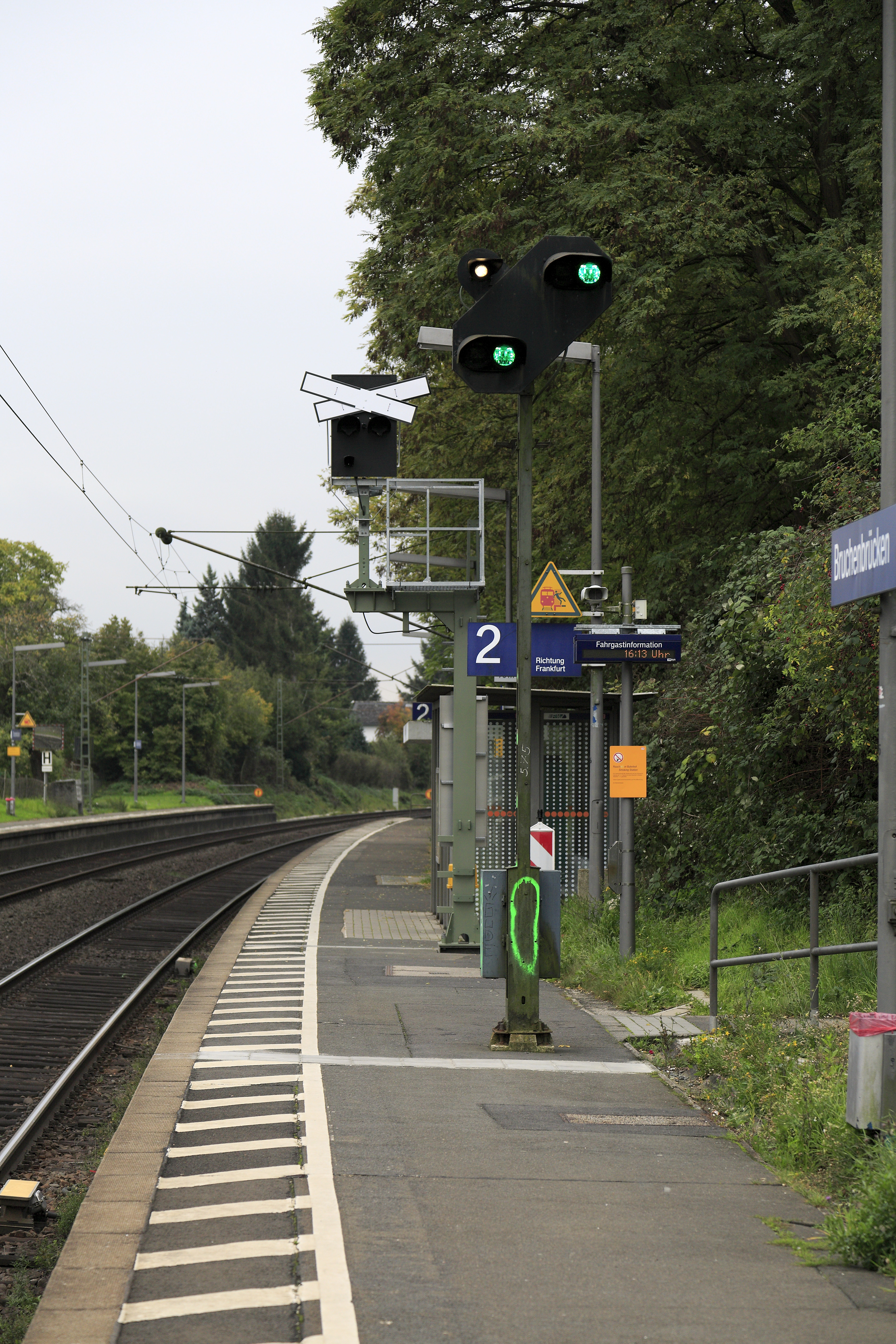
- 2015

General information
- Location: Ilbenstädter Hohl 8; 61169 Bruchenbrücken; Hesse; Germany
- Coordinates: 50°18′08″N 8°47′18″E
- System: Hp
- Owner: Deutsche Bahn
- Operator: DB Netz; DB Station&Service
- Lines: Main–Weser Railway (KBS 630)
- Platforms: 2 side platforms
- Tracks: 2
- Train operators: S-Bahn Rhein-Main

Construction
- Parking: yes
- Cycle facilities: yes
- Accessible: yes

Other information
- Station code: 899
- DS100 code: FBB
- IBNR: 8001196
- Category: 5
- Fare zone: : 2501
- Website: www.bahnhof.de

Services
Preceding station	Rhine-Main S-Bahn	Following station
Friedberg (Hess) Terminus	S6 (Rhine-Main S-Bahn)	Nieder Wöllstadt towards Darmstadt Hbf
Location
- Location within Hesse Location within Germany Location within Europe

Bruchenbrücken station (German: Haltepunkt Bruchenbrücken) is a railway station in the municipality of Bruchenbrücken, located in the Wetteraukreis district in Hesse, Germany.
