= Grand Duchy of Hesse State Railways =

Former transport company

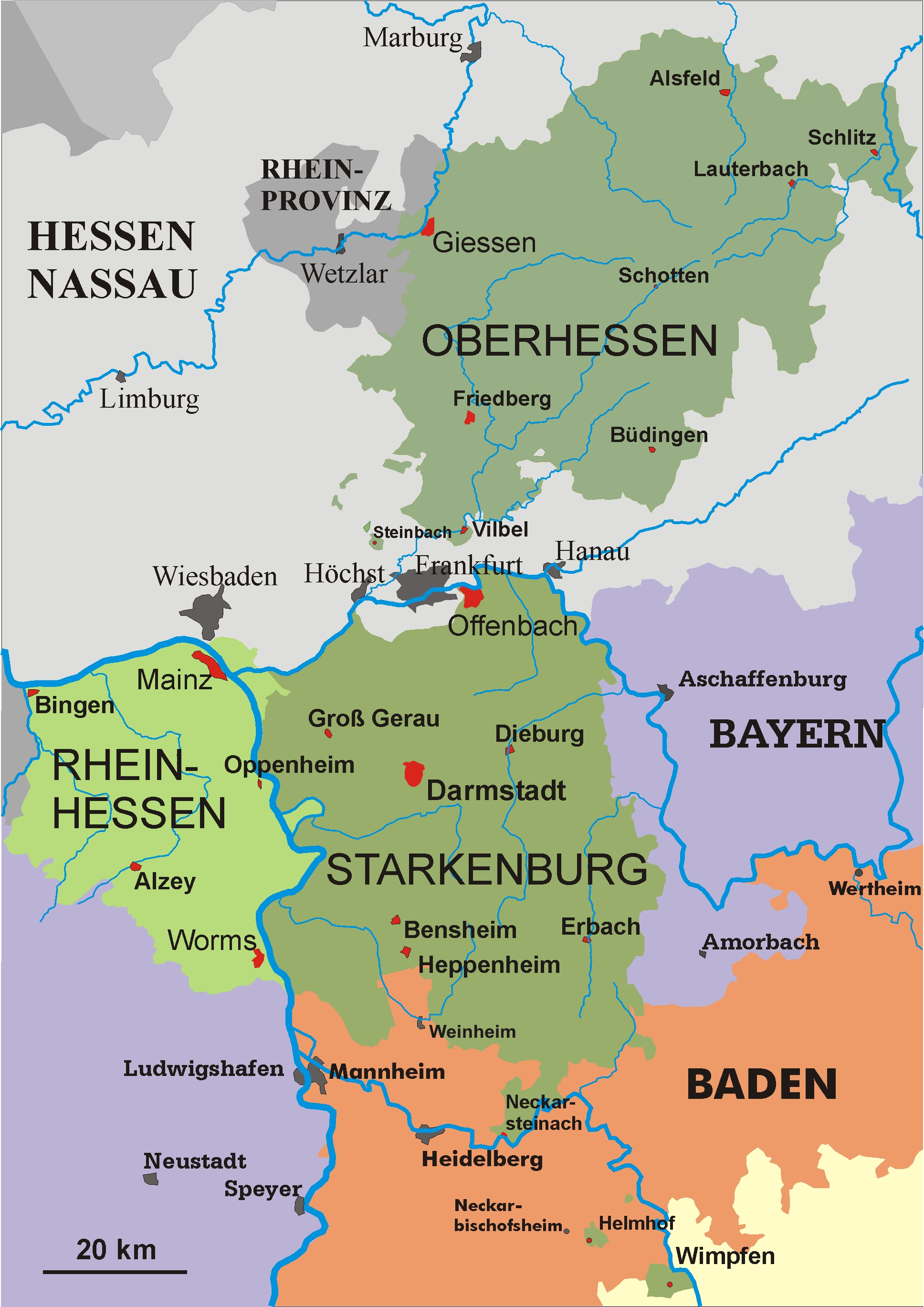
The provinces of the Grand Duchy of Hesse

The Grand Duchy of Hesse State Railways (Großherzoglich Hessischen Staatseisenbahnen) belonged to the Länderbahnen at the time of the German Empire. In the 19th century, the Grand Duchy of Hesse consisted of three provinces. Between the rivers Rhine, Main, and Neckar, the province of Starkenburg embraced the Odenwald and the Hessian Ried. It also included the ducal residence of Darmstadt. West of the Rhine was the province of Rhenish Hesse (Rheinhessen), with the towns of Mainz, Worms, and Bingen. The province of Upper Hesse (Oberhessen), which included the Vogelsberg and the Wetterau, was not directly linked by land to the others. As a result of its lack of territorial integrity, the state did not initially build its own state railway. Rather, it took part in joint state railway projects with its neighbouring states. These were the:

- Main-Neckar Railway with Frankfurt and Baden
- Main-Weser Railway with Frankfurt and Kurhessen
- Frankfurt-Offenbach Local Railway with the Free City of Frankfurt

As for the rest, a large number of projects by the private Hessian Ludwig Railway Company were encouraged. Not until 1876 did the Grand Duchy of Hesse found its own state railway. Its basis was the acquisition of the Upper Hessian Railway Company. This opened and operated the Vogelsberg and Lahn-Kinzig lines from Giessen between 1869 and 1871. In 1880, of a total of 175.8 kilometres (109.2 mi) of route, 147.2 km (91.5 mi) lay in Hessen-Darmstadt and 28.0 km (17.4 mi) in Prussia.

After its transition into state ownership, the network was expanded in accordance with a statute of 29 May 1884, by three branch lines, that fed into the Giessen-Gelnhausen line in the Vogelsberg region:

- Nidda-Schotten railway from 26 May 1888
- Stockheim-Gedern railway from 1 October 1888
- Hungen-Laubach railway from 1 June 1890

Another state branch line, the Eberstadt-Pfungstadt railway, was opened on 20 December 1886. It was only 1.9 km (1.2 mi) long and was operated by the "Main-Neckar Railway", but had its own staff, locomotives, and coaches.

In 1897, the Hessian State Railways were merged into the Prussian-Hessian Railway Company.
