= Hessische Landesbahn =

German regional transport company

Hessische Landesbahn GmbH
- Type: Owned by the State of Hesse
- Industry: Transportation
- Founded: 1955; 71 years ago
- Headquarters: Frankfurt am Main, Germany
- Key people: Veit Salzmann (Supervisor)
- Website: hlb-online.de

Hessische Landesbahn (Hessian State Railway, HLB) is a regional transport company owned by the German state of Hesse, based in Frankfurt am Main. It provides bus and rail passenger transport services and, to a lesser extent, rail freight services in Hesse and across the state’s borders through its subsidiaries and affiliates.

== Company ==
The management of Hessische Landesbahn is supervised by Veit Salzmann. The districts and the State of Hesse are represented by four people on the Supervisory Board and the employees also have four seats on the Board.

=== Structure ===
Hessische Landesbahn GmbH operates as the holding company of three subsidiaries:

- HLB Hessenbahn GmbH operates rail services;
- HLB Hessenbus GmbH operates bus services;
- HLB Basis AG provides the resources for the transport operators; it is a railway infrastructure company, it owns most of the vehicles operated and it operates vehicle workshops.

HLB Hessenbus and HLB Hessenbahn are 100 per cent owned subsidiary, HLB Basis is almost 85% owned by HLB, while the remaining shares are mostly owned by local authorities.

== History ==
The company was founded in 1955 as a holding company of several non-government-owned railways in Hesse, which operated as an integrated railway company with its own rail infrastructure, stations, etc., as well as operations on this infrastructure.

In the course of the separation of infrastructure and operations in 2005, three of the four subsidiaries of HLB: the Frankfurt-Königsteiner Eisenbahn, the Butzbach-Licher Eisenbahn and the Kassel-Naumburger Eisenbahn were united under the holding company of the Frankfurt-Königsteiner Eisenbahn, since trading as HLB Basis, as the common infrastructure operator.

=== Train services ===
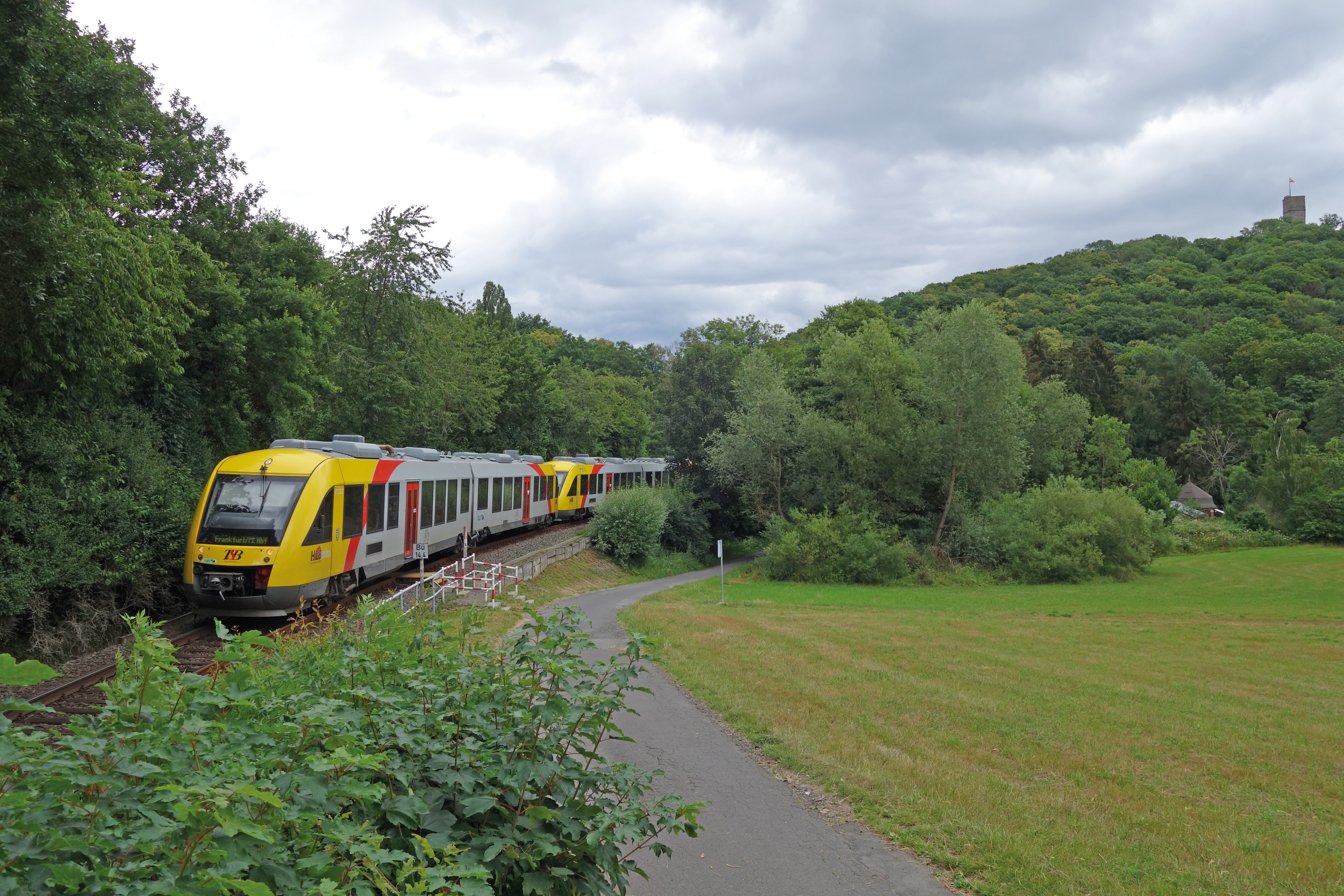
LINT 41 railcar underneath Königstein Castle heading for Frankfurt

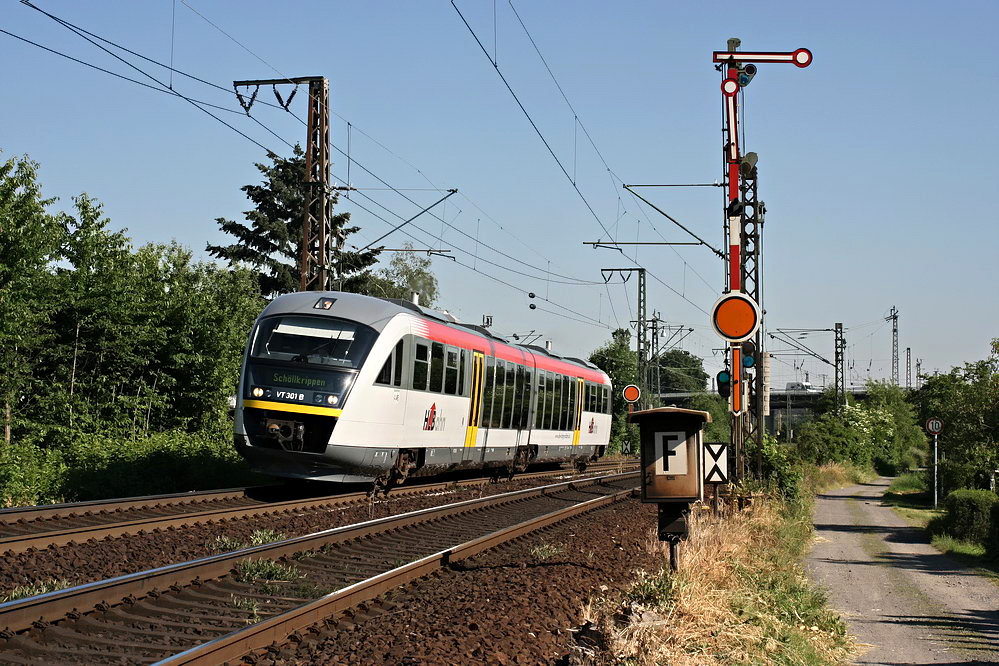
VT 301 of the HLB running towards the Kahlgrund Railway in Hanau

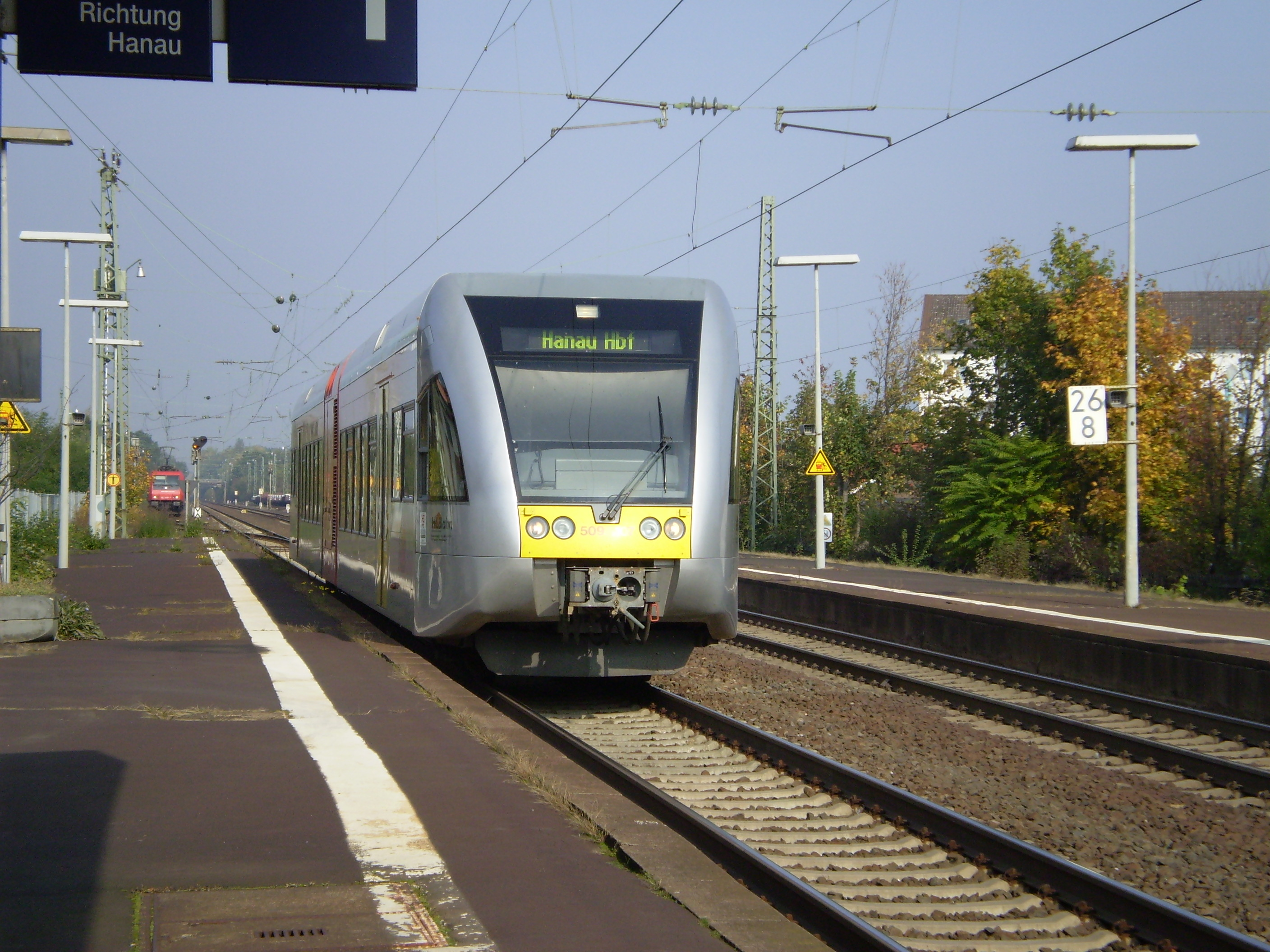
GTW 2/6 in Hanau Nord station

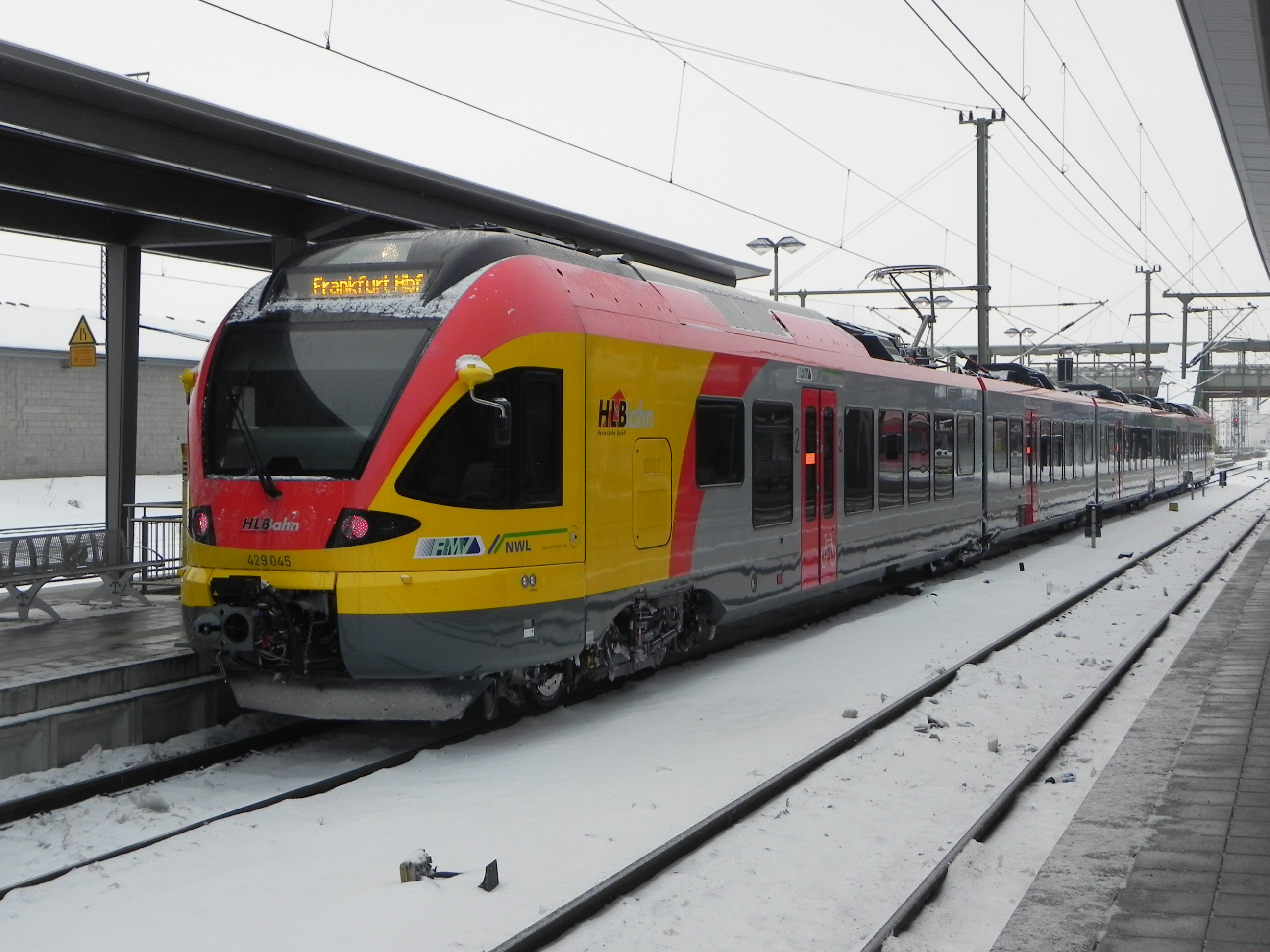
FLIRT 429 045 of the HLB in Gießen.

The subsidiaries of the Hessische Landesbahn operate 3.8 million train kilometres each year over 237.5 kilometres of line and 10.34 million vehicle kilometres each year over 1,013 km of bus route.

The main line of the HLB originally was the Königstein Railway between Königstein and Frankfurt-Höchst of the former Frankfurt-Königsteiner Eisenbahn (Frankfurt-Königstein Railway, FKE), known as the K-Bahn and part of the Frankfurter Verkehrsverbund (Frankfurt Transport Association, FVV).

In the 1990s, the HLB subsidiaries operated a number of local lines acquired from Deutsche Bahn in north and middle Hesse. Since 11 December 2005, HLB multiple units have operated on the Kahlgrund Railway from Hanau to Schöllkrippen in the Bavarian Spessart. Besides railways it operates buses and tram lines.

Since December 2010, HLB has also run on the main line Frankfurt–Gießen–Siegen/Marburg routes (RMV lines 98/99, the Main-Sieg-Express) and, since December 2011, it has operated Regionalbahn services on the RMV lines 45 and 52 on the Limburg–Gießen–Alsfeld–Fulda and the Fulda–Gersfeld routes.

=== Investments ===
HLB Basis AG has a 50% interest in Regionalbahn Kassel (RBK), with the remainder held by Kasseler Verkehrs-Gesellschaft (KVG). The KVG operates the Kassel–Waldkappel railway, which combines rail freight and tram traffic. The RBK, in turn, holds 49% of Regionaltram Betriebsgesellschaft, a joint venture with Deutsche Bahn, which, as RegioTram Kassel, operates tram-trains in the Kassel area.

Through other subsidiaries the HLB operates passenger transport services beyond the Hessian borders in four of the six neighbouring states:

- in Rhineland-Palatinate, together with Westerwaldbahn GmbH, in vectus Verkehrsgesellschaft mbH (HLB 74.9%),
- in North Rhine-Westphalia and Rhineland-Palatinate, together with Westerwaldbahn GmbH and Kreisbahn Siegen-Wittgenstein, in HellertalBahn GmbH (HLB 33%),
- in Lower Saxony and Thuringia, together with BeNEX, a subsidiary of the Hamburger Hochbahn, in Cantus Verkehrsgesellschaft (HLB 50%),
- in Thuringia, together with Erfurter Bahn (EB), in the Süd-Thüringen-Bahn GmbH (HLB 50%).

== Lines ==
The following lines, using the numbering of the Rhein-Main-Verkehrsverbund are operated by the Hessische Landesbahn:

Service	Line name	Route	Concession period	Normal rolling stock
RE 9	East Rhine Railway, Taunus Railway	Frankfurt Hbf – Frankfurt-Höchst – Mainz-Kastel – Wiesbaden-Biebrich – Eltville	Dec. 2019 – Dec. 2025	Alstom Coradia Continental
RB 21	Main-Lahn Railway; Ländches Railway	Limburg (Lahn) – Niedernhausen – Wiesbaden Hbf	Dec. 2014 – Dec. 2032	Lint 41
RE 24	Feeder to the IC34	Gießen-Wetzlar-Weilburg	Dec. 2021 – Dec. 2038	Lint 41
RB 29	Limburg-Staffel–Siershahn railway	Limburg (Lahn) – Diez Ost – Staffel – Montabaur – Siershahn	Dec. 2014 – Dec. 2030	LINT, Stadler GTW 2/6
RB 37	Main–Weser Railway	Frankfurt (Main) – Friedberg – Gießen (– Marburg – Kirchhain)	Dec. 2023 – Dec. 2038	Coradia Continental
RB 40	Main–Weser Railway, Dill Railway	Frankfurt (Main) Hbf – Friedberg – Gießen – Herborn – Dillenburg	Dec. 2023 – Dec. 2038	Coradia Continental
RB 41	Main–Weser Railway	Frankfurt (Main) Hbf – Friedberg – Gießen – Marburg – Schwalmstadt-Treysa	Dec. 2023 – Dec. 2038	Coradia Continental
RB 45	Lahntal railway Vogelsberg Railway	Limburg (Lahn) – Wetzlar – Gießen – Grünberg – Mücke (Hess) – Alsfeld – Lauterbach Nord – Fulda	Dec. 2011 – Dec. 2038	LINT 41 and 54
RB 46	Lahn-Kinzig Railway	Gießen – Hungen – Nidda – Glauburg-Stockheim – Gelnhausen	Jan. 2001 – Dec. 2032	GTW 2/6
RB 47	Friedberg–Mücke railway	Friedberg – Wölfersheim-Södel	May 1999 – Dec. 2032	GTW 2/6
RB 48	Beienheim–Schotten railway Main-Weser Railway	(Frankfurt (Main) Hbf –) Friedberg (Hess) – Beienheim – Reichelsheim – Echzell – Nidda (from Frankfurt only Mon–Fri)	May 1999 – Dec. 2032	GTW 2/6
RB 49	Friedberg–Hanau railway, Main–Weser Railway	Hanau – Nidderau – Friedberg – Gießen	Dec. 2023 – Dec. 2038	Coradia Continental
RB 52	Fulda–Gersfeld Railway	Fulda – Gersfeld	Dec. 2011 – Dec. 2023	LINT 41 and 54
RB 58	Frankfurt-Hanau Railway; Main-Spessart railway	Frankfurt (Main) Hbf – Maintal – Hanau Hbf – Großkrotzenburg – Kahl am Main – Aschaffenburg Hbf	Dec. 2018 – Dec. 2033	Coradia Continental
RE 59	Frankfurt Airport loop, Main Railway, Frankfurt–Hanau railway, Main-Spessart railway	Frankfurt Airport regional station – Frankfurt South – Maintal – Hanau Hbf – Großkrotzenburg – Kahl am Main – Aschaffenburg Hbf	Dec. 2018 – Dec. 2033	Coradia Continental
RB 75	Rhine-Main Railway	Wiesbaden Hbf – Mainz Hbf – Groß-Gerau – Darmstadt Hbf – Dieburg – Babenhausen – Aschaffenburg Hbf	Dec. 2018 – Dec. 2033	Coradia Continental
RB 90	Westerwald-Sieg-Bahn	Limburg (Lahn) – Diez Ost – Staffel – Westerburg – Nistertal-Bad Marienberg – Hachenburg – Altenkirchen – Au (Sieg) – Wissen – Betzdorf – Siegen (one train pair to Kreuztal)	Dec. 2014 – Dec. 2030	LINT, GTW 2/6
RB 91	Ruhr-Sieg-Bahn	Siegen – Finnentrop (one train pair)	Dec. 2014 – Dec. 2030	LINT, GTW 2/6
RB 92	Biggesee-Express	Finnentrop – Olpe	Dec. 2014 – Dec. 2030	LINT, GTW 2/6
RB 93	Kreuztal–Cölbe railway	Bad Berleburg – Erndtebrück – Siegen – Betzdorf)	Dec. 2014 – Dec. 2030	LINT, GTW 2/6
RB 95	Dill Railway	Dillenburg – Haiger – Siegen	Dec. 2014 – Dec. 2030	LINT, GTW 2/6
RB 96	Heller Valley Railway	Betzdorf – Herdorf – Haiger – Dillenburg	Dec. 2015 – Dec. 2030	LINT, GTW 2/6
RE 98	Main-Weser Railway (Main-Sieg-Express)	Frankfurt (Main) Hbf – Gießen – Marburg (Lahn) – Stadtallendorf – Schwalmstadt-Treysa – Wabern – Kassel Hbf	Dec. 2015 – Dec. 2038; Operating since 2010 on Frankfurt–Marburg(–Stadtallendorf) section	FLIRT
RE 99	Main-Weser Railway, Dill Railway (Main-Sieg-Express)	Frankfurt (Main) Hbf – Gießen – Wetzlar – Dillenburg – Siegen	Dec. 2010 – Dec. 2038	FLIRT

== Future lines ==
HLB will operate these lines in the future:

Service	Line name	Route	Concession period
RE 44	Gießen–Fulda railway	Giessen – Alsfeld	Not determined

== Former lines ==
These lines were operated by the HLB:

Service	Line name	Route	Concession period
RB 11	Soden Railway	Frankfurt-Höchst – Bad Soden am Taunus	01.01.2003 – 14.12.2019 (since 1997)
RB 12	Königstein Railway	Frankfurt (Main) Hbf – Frankfurt-Höchst – Königstein im Taunus	01.01.2003 – 14.12.2019 (main line, already operated by 1995)
RB 15	Taunus Railway	Bad Homburg – Friedrichsdorf – Brandoberndorf	01.01.2003 – 14.12.2019 (operated by VHT since 1993)
RB 16	Friedrichsdorf–Friedberg railway	Friedrichsdorf – Friedberg	24.05.1998 – 14.12.2019

== Fare/transport associations ==
The HLB-lines are running in the area of the fare/transport associations Rhein-Main-Verkehrsverbund (RMV), Verkehrsverbund Rhein-Mosel (VRM), Rheinland-Tarif (Verkehrsverbund Rhein-Sieg, (VRS)) and Westfalen-Tarif.

Hessische Landesbahn is a member of the Tarifverband der Bundeseigenen und Nichtbundeseigenen Eisenbahnen in Deutschland (Fare association of federally and non-federally owned railways in Germany). Tickets for travel on Deutsche Bahn trains can therefore also be used on HLB trains.
