= Hungen =

- Town
- Coat of arms

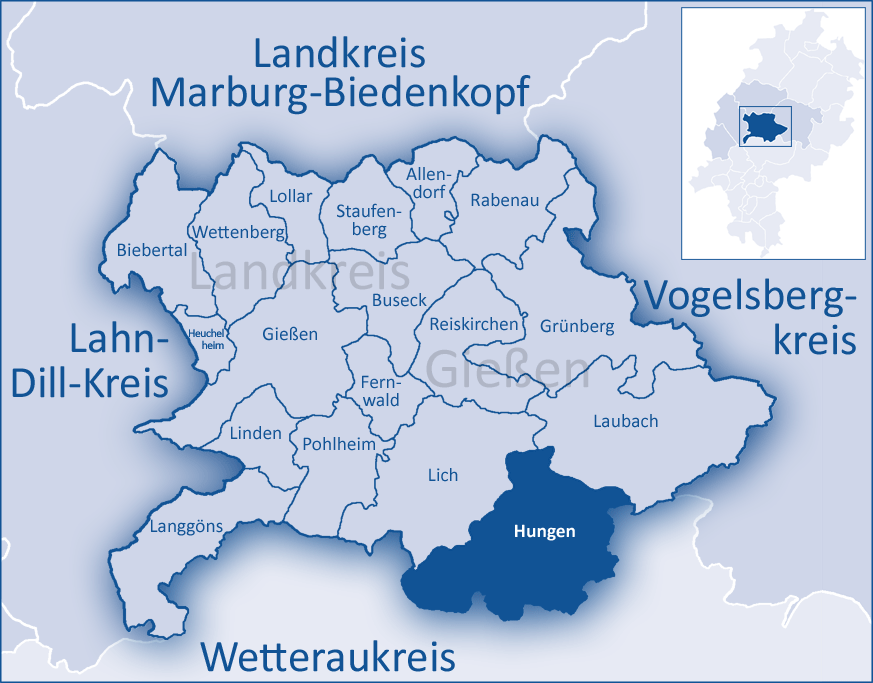
- Location of Hungen within Gießen district
- Interactive map of Hungen
- Location within Germany Location within Hesse
- Coordinates: 50°28′N 08°54′E
- Country: Germany
- State: Hesse
- Admin. region: Gießen
- District: Gießen

Government
  - Mayor (2023–29): Rainer Wengorsch

Area
  - Total: 86.78 km^{2} (33.51 sq mi)
- Elevation: 144 m (472 ft)

Population (2025-12-31)
  - Total: 12,752
  - Density: 146.9/km^{2} (380.6/sq mi)
- Time zone: UTC+01:00 (CET)
  - Summer (DST): UTC+02:00 (CEST)
- Postal codes: 35410
- Dialling codes: 06402
- Vehicle registration: GI
- Website: www.hungen.de

Hungen (German pronunciation: [ˈhʊŋən]) is a town in the district of Gießen, in Hesse, Germany. It is situated 20 km southeast of Gießen, and 18 km northeast of Friedberg. Surrounding towns are Laubach to the north, Nidda to the east, Wölfersheim to the south, and Münzenberg and Lich to the west.

The history of Hungen dates back to 782. In 1806 it came under the sovereignty of the Grand Duchy of Hesse.

Buildings of interest include the Hungen Castle, the Evangelical Church, parts of the medieval city wall and Hungen station.

== Looted books depository ==
At the end of World War II American forces discovered almost 1.2 million looted books and prints at Hungen, among them the contents of the Rothschild Library at Frankfurt, which had been removed by the Nazis from Frankfurt because of Allied bombing raids.

== Hungen in the media ==
=== Literature ===
Shmuel Spector, Geoffrey Wigoder, The Encyclopedia of Jewish Life Before and During the Holocaust ISBN 0-8147-9356-8, New York University Press, 2001.

=== Film ===
My Opposition: the Diaries of Friedrich Kellner

The railroad station of Hungen can be seen in this 2007 Canadian documentary, which recounts the story of Robert Scott Kellner and his grandfather, Friedrich Kellner, chief justice inspector of Laubach who wrote the anti-Nazi diary, "My Opposition."

== See also ==
- Hungen (meteorite), for the Hungen meteorite (fallen in 1877).
