= Gießen–Gelnhausen railway =

Railway line in Germany

Gießen–Gelnhausen

Overview
- Line number: 3701
- Locale: Hesse, Germany

Service
- Route number: 631

Technical
- Line length: 67.9 km (42.2 mi)
- Track gauge: 1,435 mm (4 ft 8 1/2 in) standard gauge
- Operating speed: 85 km/h (53 mph) (maximum)

The Gießen–Gelnhausen railway (also known as the Lahn-Kinzig Railway) is a single-track, non-electrified mainline in the German state of Hesse. It runs from Gießen via Nidda to Gelnhausen.

== Operations ==
The line is part of the government-owned railway network (DB Netz) and is currently (2012) served by passenger trains (GTW 2/6) operated by the HLB Hessenbahn GmbH, a subsidiary of Hessische Landesbahn, on behalf of the Rhein-Main-Verkehrsverbund (Rhine-Main Transport Association, RMV).

In the 2003/2004 timetable, which commenced on 14 December 2003, services on weekends and holidays was reordered. In addition, the Nidda–Glauburg–Büdingen–Gelnhausen section is served every morning and evening by bus line 374. Until the 2009/2010 timetable, this route was still called line 610 and served the whole line from Gelnhausen to Gießen.

== History ==
Planning on the line began in 1862 and it was built and operated by the Upper Hessian Railway Company (Oberhessische Eisenbahn-Gesellschaft) and opened in several sections:

Opening dates for sections
Date	Beginning	End	Length
29.12.1869	Gießen	Hungen	21.83 km
29.06.1870	Hungen	Nidda	13.23 km
30.10.1870	Nidda	Büdingen	19.79 km
30.11.1870	Büdingen	Gelnhausen	14.91 km

An extension to Partenstein on the Bavarian Ludwig's Western Railway (Ludwigs-West-Bahn) did not come about. However, the line became important from 1888 with the integration of some branch lines in the Vogelsberg and Wetterau.

The Upper Hessian Railway Company was nationalised in 1876 and its operations were taken over by the Grand Duchy of Hesse State Railways (Großherzoglich Hessische Staatseisenbahnen).
