= Friedberg (Hess) station =

Railway station in Friedberg, Germany

Friedberg (Hess)
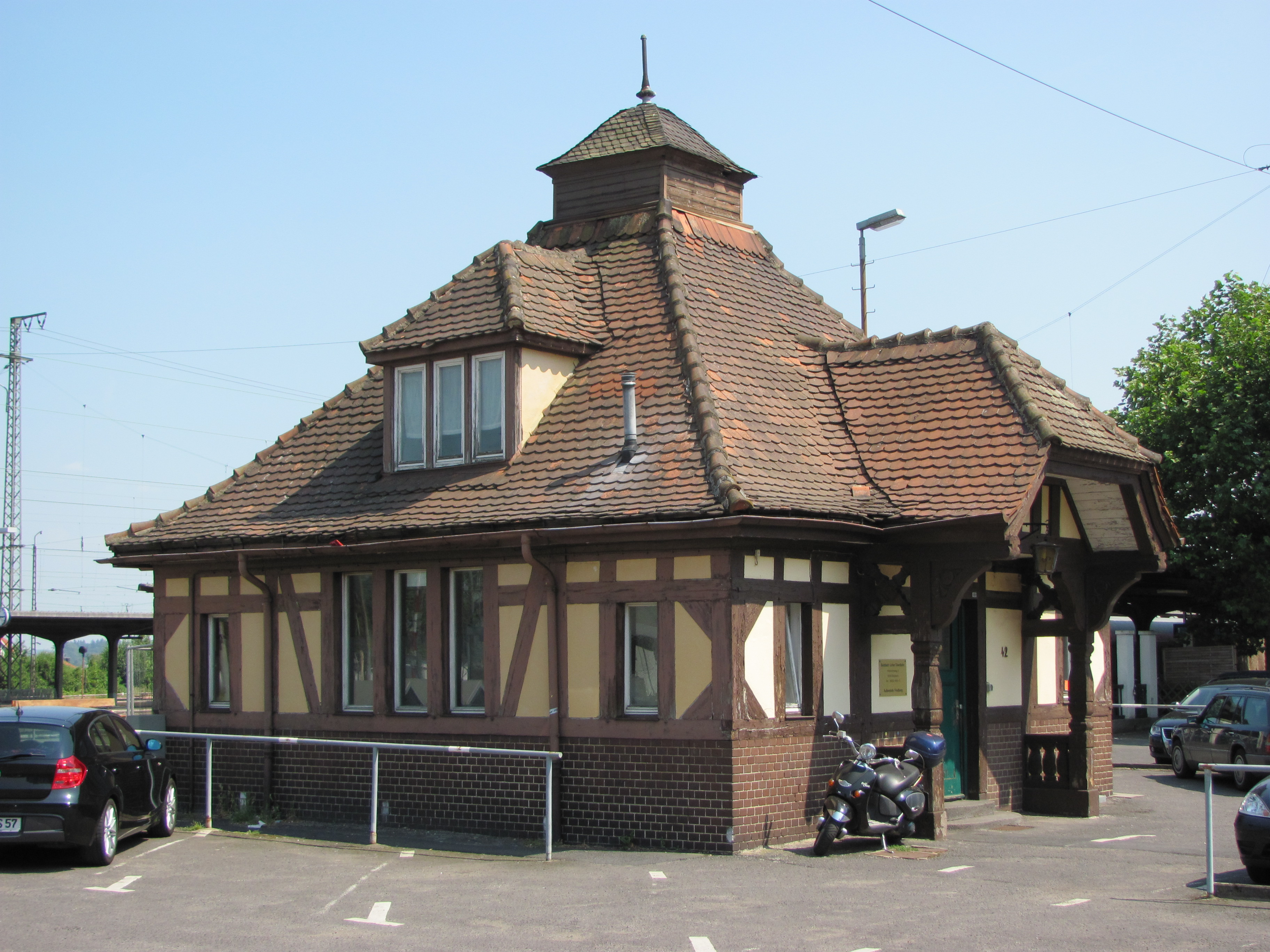
- Former royal reception building

General information
- Location: Hanauer Str. 44, Friedberg, Hesse; Germany
- Coordinates: 50°19′55″N 8°45′39″E
- Owner: Deutsche Bahn
- Operator: DB Netz; DB Station&Service
- Lines: Main-Weser Railway (165.9 km); Friedberg–Hanau railway (0.0 km); Friedberg–Friedrichsdorf railway (40.1 km); Friedberg–Mücke railway (0.0 km)
- Platforms: 10

Construction
- Accessible: No (except platforms 1, 1a)
- Architect: Krause
- Architectural style: Neoclassicism / Renaissance Revival

Other information
- Station code: 1868
- DS100 code: FFG
- IBNR: 8000111
- Category: 3
- Fare zone: : 2501
- Website: www.bahnhof.de

History
- Opened: 10 August 1913

Passengers
- about 17,500

Services
Preceding station	DB Fernverkehr	Following station
Gießen towards Bremen Hbf	ICE 26	Frankfurt West towards Karlsruhe Hbf
Preceding station	DB Regio Mitte	Following station
Bad Nauheim towards Kassel Hbf	RE 30	Frankfurt West towards Frankfurt (Main) Hbf
Gießen towards Dillenburg	RB 40	Frankfurt (Main) Hbf towards Frankfurt (Main) Hbf
Terminus	RB 49	Assenheim (Oberhess) towards Hanau Hbf
Preceding station	Hessische Landesbahn	Following station
Gießen towards Siegen Hbf	RE 99	Frankfurt (Main) Hbf towards Frankfurt (Main) Hbf
Terminus	RB 47	Dorheim (Wetterau) towards Wölfersheim-Södel
Terminus	RB 48	Dorheim (Wetterau) towards Nidda
Preceding station	Start	Following station
Terminus	RB 16	Friedberg Süd towards Friedrichsdorf or Bad Homburg
Preceding station	Rhine-Main S-Bahn	Following station
Terminus	S6 (Rhine-Main S-Bahn)	Bruchenbrücken towards Darmstadt Hbf
Location

Friedberg (Hess) station is the station of Friedberg, Germany, on the Main-Weser Railway.

== History ==
=== First station ===
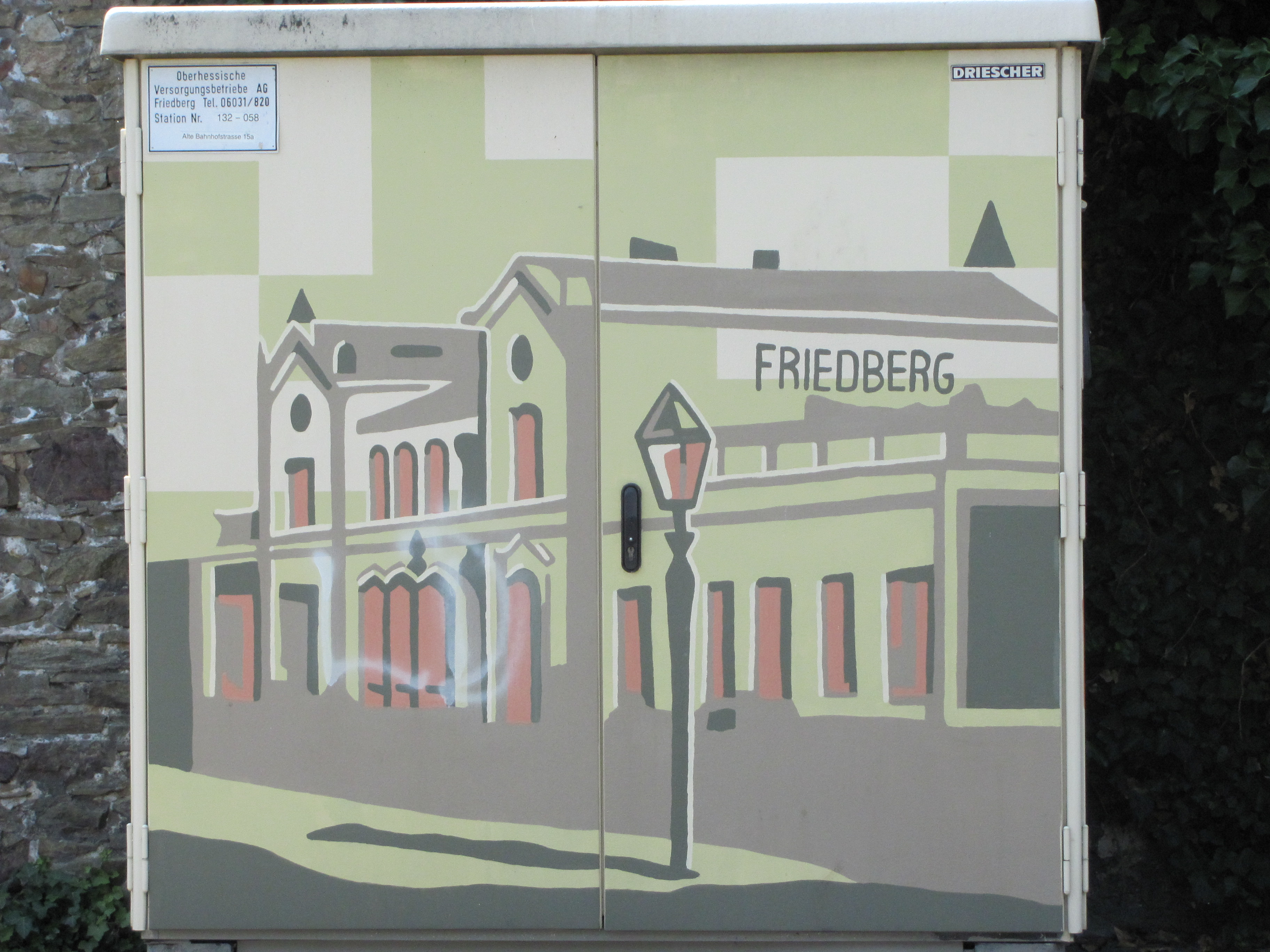
Sketch of original station

The first Friedberg station was opened on 10 May 1850 with the opening of the section of the Main-Weser Railway from Frankfurt am Main to Friedberg. On 9 November 1850 the next section to Butzbach was opened. The entire route of the Main-Weser line from Kassel to Frankfurt was opened for traffic on 15 May 1852. The station was at the 165.4 kilometre mark (from Kassel) and was designed as a through station. There is currently a parking garage on the site of the old station building.

Additional lines were connected to the Main-Weser Railway in Friedberg. On 15 September 1881, the Friedberg–Hanau railway was fully opened, following the commencement of services to Heldenbergen-Windecken (now Nidderau) station on 1 December 1879. On 1 October 1897 the Friedberg–Mücke Railway opened. On 13 July 1901 the Friedberg–Friedrichsdorf–Bad Homburg line opened; this was part of a line from Bad Nauheim to Wiesbaden, also known as the Bäderbahn (Spa Railway). Friedberg became a hub for passengers and freight.

=== Second station ===
On 10 August 1913 the second Friedberger station was opened at the 165.9 kilometre mark, about 500 metres further south. On 28 May 1978 the station became the terminal of line S6 of the Rhine-Main S-Bahn.

== Railway ==
Friedberg station has two platforms next to the main station building and four island platforms, for a total of ten platform faces. One of the main platforms is a bay platform used only for local trains to and from Friedrichsdorf. The trains to Hanau depart from the easternmost platform. East of the platforms is a freight yard with another 12 tracks. Previously, the station handled a large amount of seasonal sugar beet traffic from the surrounding region, the Wetterau. The freight yard is hardly used now. The northern exit from the station led directly on to the Rosental Viaduct (built from 1847 to 1850), which was replaced in 1982 by a modern concrete bridge, located a few metres to the east.

== Buildings ==
The original buildings were built in a neoclassical style; the entrance building could have been designed by Julius Eugen Ruhl. It was demolished in 1983.

The current station building and other buildings of the station are mostly classed as cultural monuments under the Hessian Heritage Act. The current station building was built in 1912–1913 in a mixture of neoclassical and Renaissance Revival architecture to the design of a government architect from Darmstadt, Krause, who was influenced by Armin Wegner. In the vestibule are original ceramic tiles and stained glass windows, which are influenced by Art Nouveau.

North of the station building is a former royal reception building, which was constructed in 1897–98, south of the original station and later moved to the new station.

== Train services ==
=== Long distance ===
Every four hours, an ICE service from Bremen to Karlsruhe stops in Friedberg.

Line	Route	Interval
ICE 26	Bremen – Hannover – Kassel-Wilhelmshöhe – Marburg – Friedberg – Frankfurt – Heidelberg – Karlsruhe	Every four hours

=== Regional services ===
Series	Route	Frequency
RE 98 / RE 99; Main-Sieg-Express	Siegen – Dillenburg – Gießen – Friedberg – Frankfurt	Every 2 hours
RE 30; Main-Weser Railway	Kassel Hbf – Kassel-Wilhelmshöhe – Wabern – Treysa – Neustadt – Stadtallendorf – Kirchhain – Marburg – Gießen – Friedberg – Frankfurt	Every 2 hours
RB 16; Friedberg–Friedrichsdorf railway	Friedberg – Friedrichsdorf	Every 30 minutes
RB 40 / RB 41; Mittelhessen-Express	Dillenburg – Gießen – Friedberg – Frankfurt	Every 2 hours
RB 47; Friedberg–Mücke railway	Friedberg – Wölfersheim-Södel	Hourly
RB 48; Beienheim–Schotten railway	Friedberg – Nidda	Hourly
RB 49; Friedberg-Hanau railway	Friedberg – Nidderau – Hanau	Every 30 or 60 minutes
