= Gelnhausen station =

Railway station in Gelnhausen, Germany

Gelnhausen
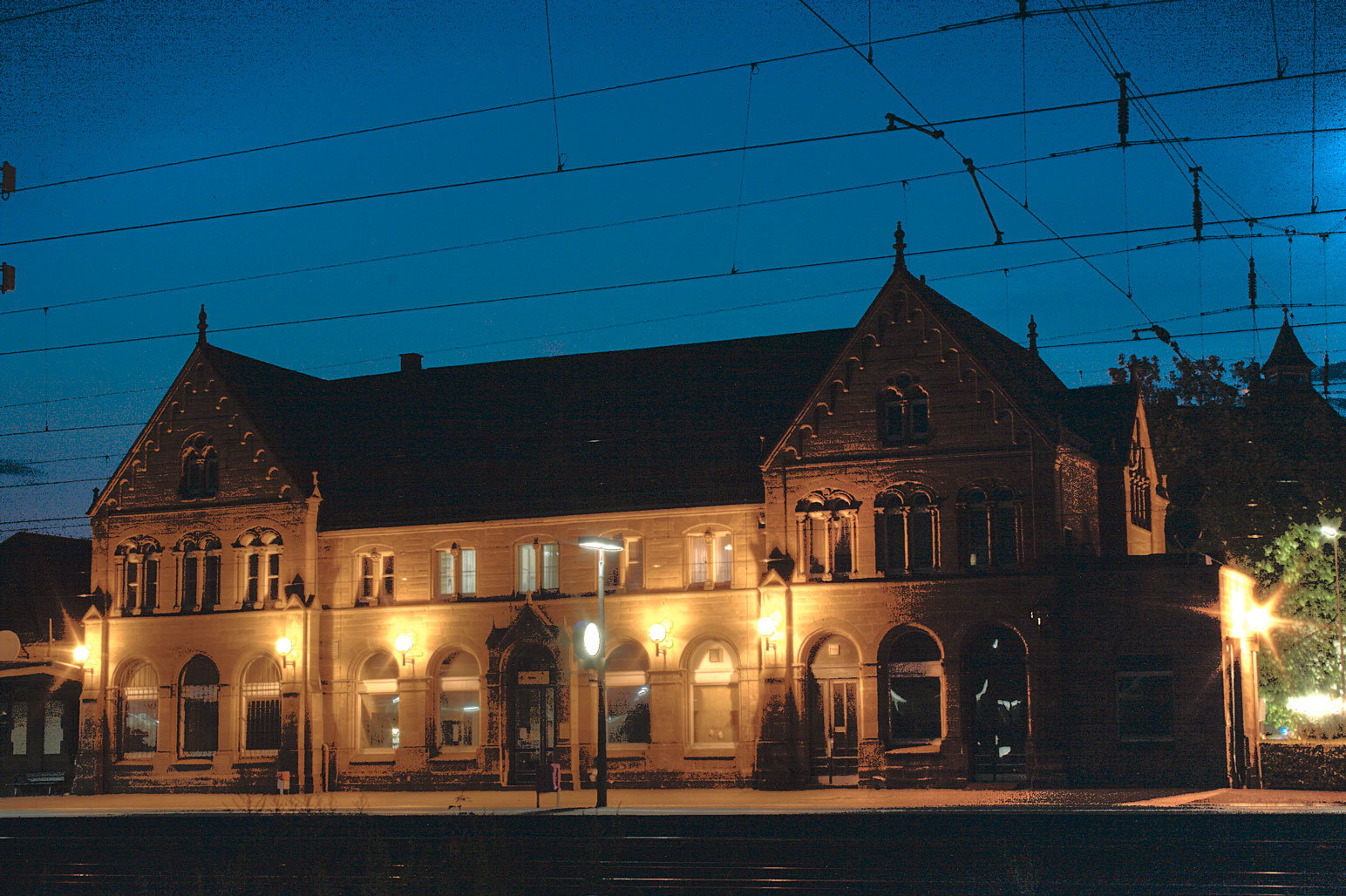
- Station building at night

General information
- Location: Bahnhofstraße 6, Gelnhausen, Hesse; Germany
- Coordinates: 50°11′48″N 9°11′22″E
- Lines: Frankfurt–Göttingen (km 69.7) (KBS 610; Gießen–Gelnhausen (km 44.1) (KBS 631); Gelnhausen–Langenselbold (km 0.0) (closed); Gelnhausen–Lochborn (km 0.0) (closed)
- Platforms: 4

Construction
- Accessible: Platforms 1, 18 only
- Architect: Paul Rowald
- Architectural style: Romanesque Revival

Other information
- Station code: 2051
- DS100 code: FGEL
- IBNR: 8000117
- Category: 4
- Fare zone: : 3130
- Website: www.bahnhof.de

History
- Opened: 1 May 1867

Passengers
- 5,000

Services
Preceding station	DB Regio Mitte	Following station
Langenselbold towards Frankfurt (Main) Hbf	RE 50	Wächtersbach towards Bebra
Hailer-Meerholz towards Frankfurt (Main) Hbf	RB 51	Haitz-Höchst towards Wächtersbach
Preceding station	Hessische Landesbahn	Following station
Lieblos towards Gießen	RB 46	Terminus
Location

Gelnhausen station is the station of the town of Gelnhausen on the Frankfurt–Göttingen railway in the German state of Hesse.

== History ==
The station was built by the Frankfurt–Bebra railway as the station of the former county town of the district of Gelnhausen. Services commenced on the Hanau Ost–Wächtersbach section on 1 May 1867.

== Buildings ==
The entrance building and the rest of the station buildings are now mostly classified as cultural monuments under the Hessian Monument Protection Act.

=== Entrance building ===
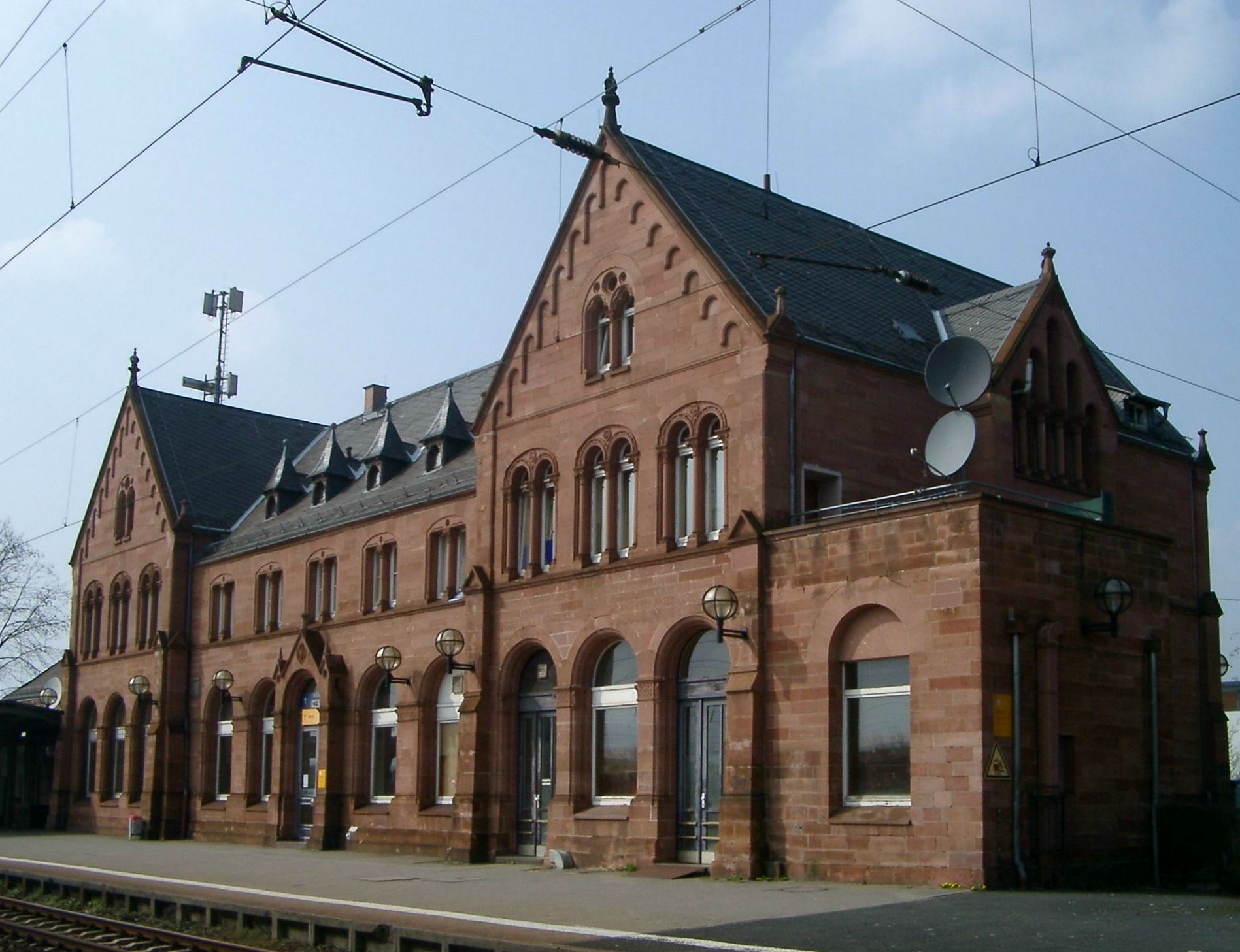
Station, track side

The entrance building was built in a Romanesque Revival style of Buntsandstein (coloured sandstone) and so added to the historic buildings of the Hohenstaufen town of Gelnhausen, which include the most famous Romanesque building in the city, the Imperial Palace (Kaiserpfalz Gelnhausen), but also the romanesque Marienkirche and other buildings from this time. The architect Paul Rowald also designed Bad Hersfeld station with the same layout and style.

The building was built in 1882/83 and is therefore a structure of the "second generation" of structural engineering on the line. The station building is symmetrically designed on an H-shaped floor plan. On the street side the facade is dominated by three pointed gables; the middle gable is omitted from the design of the facade on the track side. A "princely pavilion" (Fürstenpavillon) was built to the west of the main building with three bay windows; there is also a detached toilet block built in the Romanesque Revival style east of the main building.

=== Other buildings ===
The buildings in the station area are the house of the track supervisor (Bahnmeister) from 1868 (a building of the "first generation" of structural engineering on the line), a freight-handling facility from the period around 1870, and a water tower—architecturally out of harmony with the towers of the Gelnhausen town wall—from 1937.

== Operations ==
The station has a home platform (a single-sided outer platform next to the station building) and a two-sided island platform. At the western end of the home platform, there is a bay platform, where services on the Gießen–Gelnhausen railway to and from Büdingen and Gießen start and end. The other three platform tracks can be used only by trains on the Frankfurt–Göttingen railway, which can run from here to Hanau-Wolfgang at 200 km/h. Local trains are often held at Gelnhausen station so that Intercity-Express and Intercity trains can pass them. Gelnhausen station is now only used by local and regional services and has great importance for commuter traffic from the Vogelsberg and Spessart hills of the Rhine-Main region.

Previously two more lines operated to Gelnhausen station:

- The standard gauge Freigericht Light Railway of the Gelnhäusen District Railway started here from 1904 until 1963.
- The narrow gauge Spessart Railway also began here and operated from 1895 to 1951.

The railway facilities of both trains were immediately south of Gelnhausen "state station”. From 1930, both railways had a common platform, which was connected by an underground passage to the platforms of the state railway. The infrastructure for the lines at the station has been demolished and has been replaced by parking lots.
