= Reichelsheim (Wetterau) =

- Town
- Coat of arms

- Location of Reichelsheim within Wetteraukreis district
- Interactive map of Reichelsheim
- Location within Germany Location within Hesse
- Coordinates: 50°21′25″N 8°52′21″E
- Country: Germany
- State: Hesse
- Admin. region: Darmstadt
- District: Wetteraukreis
- Subdivisions: 6 districts

Government
  - Mayor (2020–26): Lena Herget-Umsonst (SPD)

Area
  - Total: 27.56 km^{2} (10.64 sq mi)
- Elevation: 124–225 m (407–738 ft)

Population (2025-12-31)
  - Total: 6,913
  - Density: 250.8/km^{2} (649.7/sq mi)
- Time zone: UTC+01:00 (CET)
  - Summer (DST): UTC+02:00 (CEST)
- Postal codes: 61203
- Dialling codes: 06035
- Vehicle registration: FB
- Website: www.stadt-reichelsheim.de

Reichelsheim (Wetterau) (German pronunciation: [ˈʁaɪçl̩shaɪm]) is a town in the district Wetteraukreis, in Hesse, Germany. It is located 30 kilometers north of Frankfurt am Main.

== Division of the town ==
Reichelsheim consists of the 6 districts:

- Beienheim (population 1,570)
- Blofeld (population 476)
- Dorn-Assenheim (population 1,228)
- Heuchelheim (population 444)
- Reichelsheim (population 1,946)
- Weckesheim (population 1,077)

The total population is 6,741 (population as of 2003).

== History ==
The oldest parts are Beienheim (first mentioned in a document from the year 773) and Reichelsheim (817).

The town of Reichelsheim was created in 1972 during an extensive land reform. The formerly independent villages mentioned above joined administrative structures now concentrated in the largest of the villages, Reichelsheim.

The area which is now the town of Reichelsheim was probably already populated in Celtic times. During the fourth century BC the Celts were slowly displaced by Germanic tribes that later had to yield to Roman rule which forced all of the Wetterau under its control.

In the 6th century Frankish rule was established. The name-ending "-heim" is of Frankish origin, meaning quite literally "home of". In the case of the village of Reichelsheim, it was supposedly a frankish settler named Richholf who founded the village that was first mentioned as "Richolfsheim".

During the Thirty Years' War the town was repeatedly plundered and burned to the ground.

The village gained town status in the year 1665.

== Mayors ==
Since 2020 Lena Herget-Umsonst has been the mayor of Reichelsheim. Previous mayors were:

- 2008–2020: Bertin Bischofsberger (CDU)
- 1985–2008: Gerd Wagner (SPD)
