= Wölfersheim =

Municipality in Hesse, Germany

- Municipality
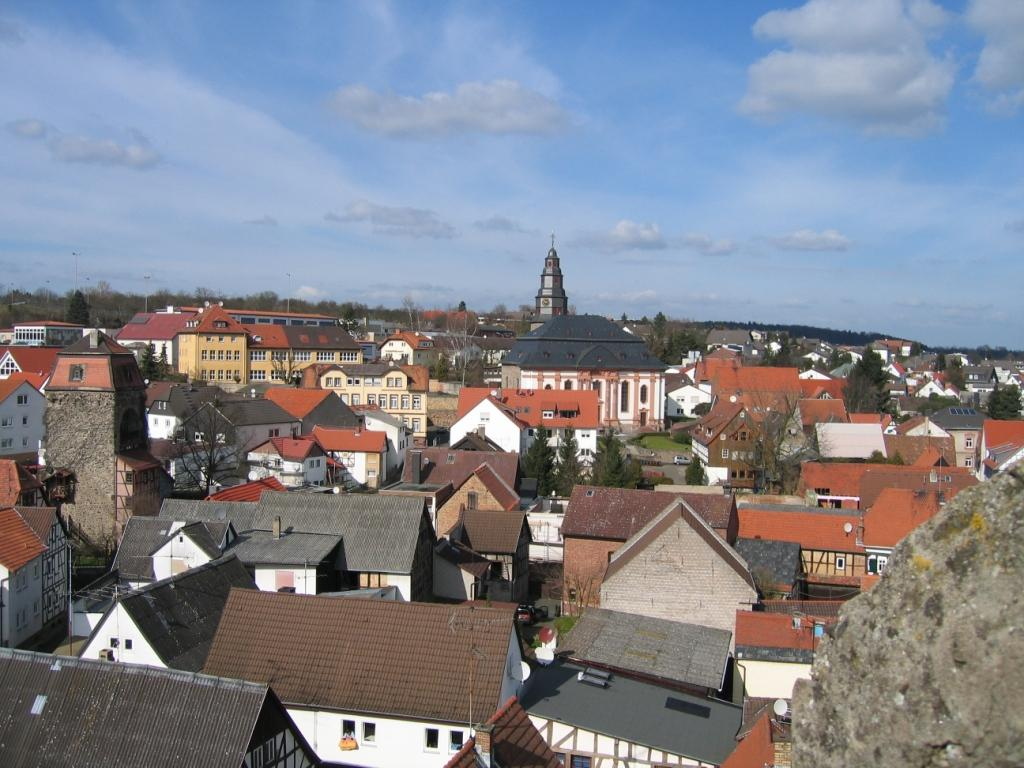
- View of the town

- Coat of arms

- Location of Wölfersheim within Wetteraukreis district
- Interactive map of Wölfersheim
- Location within Germany Location within Hesse
- Coordinates: 50°23′51″N 8°48′41″E
- Country: Germany
- State: Hesse
- Admin. region: Darmstadt
- District: Wetteraukreis
- Subdivisions: 5 districts

Government
  - Mayor (2018–24): Eike See (SPD)

Area
  - Total: 43.11 km^{2} (16.64 sq mi)
- Elevation: 142 m (466 ft)

Population (2025-12-31)
  - Total: 9,325
  - Density: 216.3/km^{2} (560.2/sq mi)
- Time zone: UTC+01:00 (CET)
  - Summer (DST): UTC+02:00 (CEST)
- Postal codes: 61200
- Dialling codes: 06036
- Vehicle registration: FB
- Website: www.woelfersheim.de

Wölfersheim (German pronunciation: [ˈvœlfɐshaɪm]) is a municipality in the Wetteraukreis in Hessen, Germany. It is located approximately 34 kilometers north of Frankfurt am Main.

== Division of the municipality ==
The municipality consists of 5 districts:

- Wölfersheim
- Södel
- Melbach
- Berstadt
- Wohnbach

== Holocaust ==
There was a small Jewish community in Wölfersheim since at least 1700. On Kristallnacht, the night of broken glass, the Jews of the town were brutally attacked by thugs. Their legal documents were destroyed and some were sent to the concentration camps where the Nazis murdered them. The Jewish cemetery still stands today though there are no Jews left in the town.
