= Burg- und Nieder-Gemünden station =

Railway station in Gemünden, Germany

Burg- u Nieder Gemünden
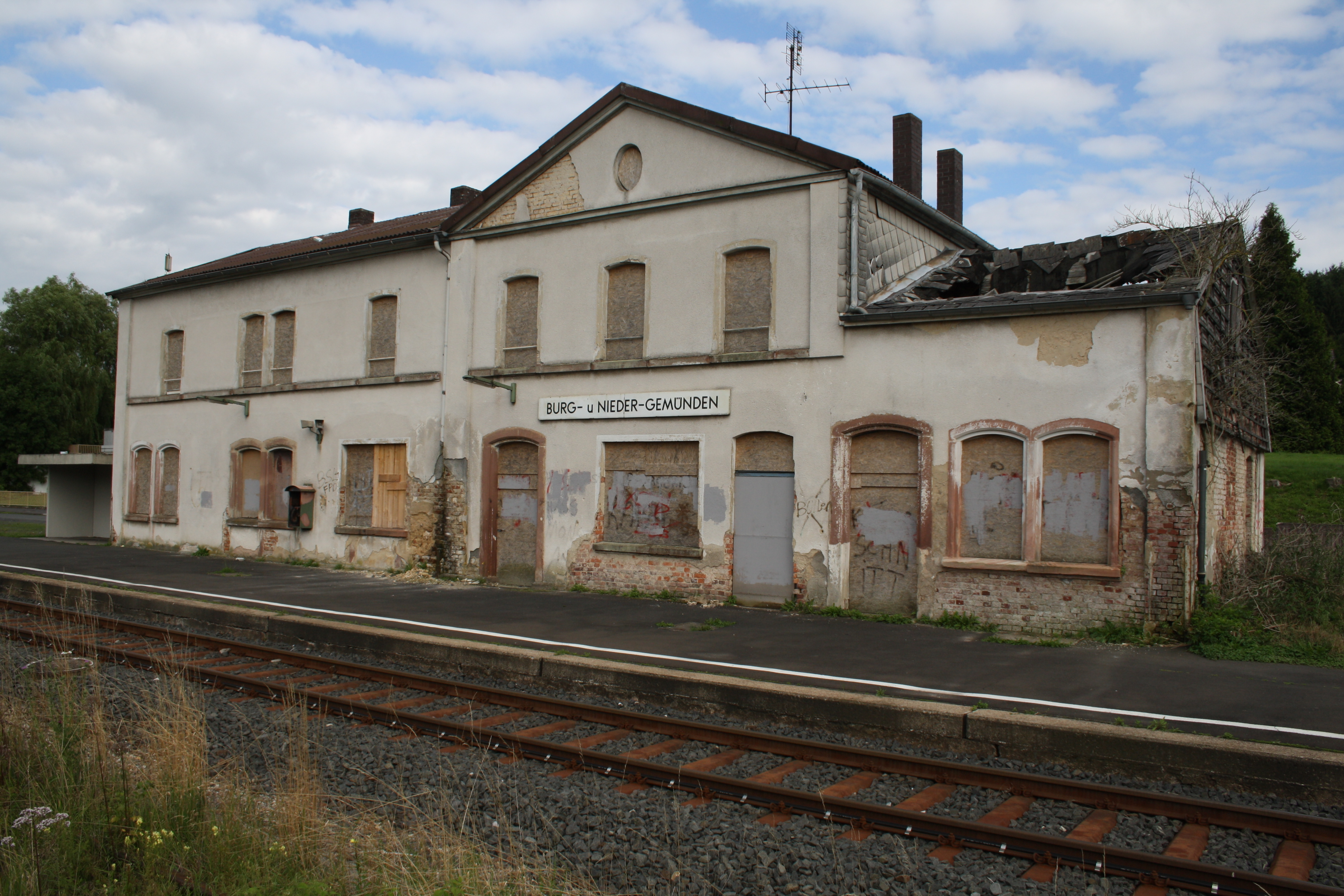
- Burg- und Nieder-Gemünden station in July 2012

General information
- Location: Bahnhofstr. 14, Nieder-Gemünden, Gemünden, Hesse; Germany
- Coordinates: 50°41′26″N 9°02′51″E
- Lines: Vogelsberg Railway (km 38.0); Kirchhain–Burg- und Nieder-Gemünden railway (km 0.0) (closed)
- Platforms: 1 (formerly 5)

Construction
- Accessible: Yes
- Architectural style: Neoclassical

Other information
- Station code: 978
- DS100 code: FBNG
- IBNR: 8000061
- Category: 6
- Fare zone: : 0910
- Website: www.bahnhof.de

History
- Opened: 29 July 1870

Services
Preceding station	Hessische Landesbahn	Following station
Nieder Ohmen towards Limburg (Lahn)	RB 45	Ehringshausen (Oberhess) towards Fulda
Location

Burg-und Nieder Gemünden station is, along with Ehringshausen (Oberhess) station, one of two stations in the municipality of Gemünden (Felda) in Vogelsbergkreis, Hesse, Germany. It lies at kilometer 38.0 of the Vogelsberg Railway (Gießen–Fulda). From 1901 to 1991, Kirchhain–Burg- und Nieder-Gemünden railway (also known as the Ohmtalbahn—Ohm Valley Railway) branched off here to Kirchhain via Homberg (Ohm). It is listed as a cultural monument under the Hessian Monument Protection Act (Hessischer Denkmalschutzgesetz), but the station building itself is in a neglected state.

== History ==
Burg- und Nieder-Gemünden station was opened with the Grünberg–Alsfeld section of the Vogelsberg Railway on 29 July 1870. The Vogelsberg Railway was extended to Lauterbach on 30 October and to Bad Salzschlirf on 31 December of the same year. The Bad Salzschlirf–Fulda section was completed on 31 July 1871.

The Burg- und Nieder-Gemünden–Nieder-Ofleiden section of the Kirchhain–Burg- und Nieder-Gemünden railway was opened by the Grand Duchy of Hesse State Railways (Großherzoglich Hessische Staatseisenbahnen) on 1 April 1901.

Passenger traffic on the Kirchhain–Burg- und Nieder-Gemünden railway ended on 31 May 1980. Freight transport ended on the siding to the Nieder-Ofleiden basalt plant on 28 September 1991 and the line was closed. When the Ohm Valley Railway was dismantled in 1999, Burg- und Nieder-Gemünden station was reclassified as a Haltepunkt (halt).

== Location ==
Burg- und Nieder-Gemünden station serves the two districts that it is named after, Burg-Gemünden (Castle Gemünden) and Nieder-Gemünden (Lower Gemünden) of the municipality of Gemünden (Felda). It has the address of Bahnhofstraße 14 and is located on the south-western outskirts of Nieder-Gemünden.

== Station infrastructure ==
=== Platforms ===
Burg- und Nieder-Gemünden station had, until the partial decommissioning of the Kirchhain–Burg- und Nieder-Gemünden railway, five platform tracks next to three platforms. Platform 1 (next to the entrance building) and platform 2 served the Vogelsberg Railway from Gießen to Fulda. The other platforms (platforms 3 to 5) served the Kirchhain–Burg- und Nieder-Gemünden railway. Except for platform 1, which still serves the trains of the Vogelsberg Railway, the tracks are overgrown, but not dismantled.

=== Entrance building ===
The entrance building of Burg- und Nieder-Gemünden station was built in 1870 with the Vogelsberg Railway. It has long been empty and abandoned. In Hessenschiene, issue 86, it was reported that the entrance building would be auctioned with a reserve price of €1,000.

=== Signal box ===
Although only one of the five existing tracks can be operated, the signal box in Burg- und Nieder-Gemünden is still occupied and in operation. Shortly after the signal box, the Kirchhain–Burg- und Nieder-Gemünden line turns to the north. Shortly afterwards, the remaining section of track ends.

== Connections ==
Train fares at the station are set by the Rhein-Main-Verkehrsverbund (RMV).

=== Rail ===
The station is served daily by hourly Regionalbahn services on the Limburg (Lahn)–Weilburg–Wetzlar–Gießen–Alsfeld–Fulda route, operated by Hessische Landesbahn.

Since the 2016/2017 timetable change on 11 December 2016, services on the Vogelsberg Railway (formerly RB 35) and the subsequent Lahn Valley Railway (formerly RB 25) have run as RB 45.

Line	Route	Interval
RB 45	Vogelsbergbahn; Limburg (Lahn) – Eschhofen – Weilburg – Wetzlar – Gießen – Grünberg (Oberhess) – Mücke (Hess) – Burg- u. Nieder-Gemünden – Alsfeld (Oberhess) – Fulda	Hourly (+ additional services in the peak)

=== Buses ===
At the station there are connections to some regional bus services.
