= Großen Buseck station =

Railway station in Hesse, Germany

Großen Buseck
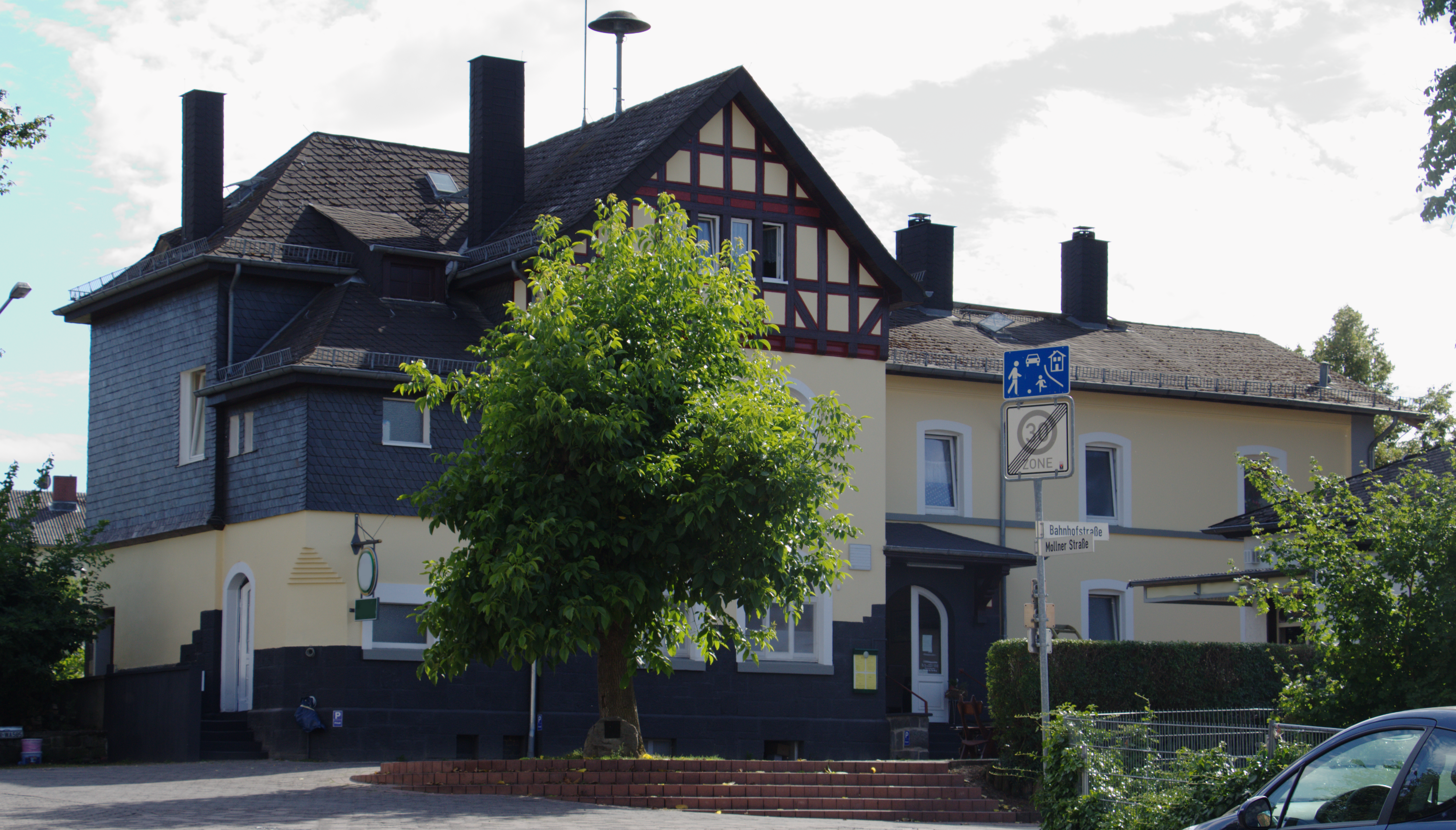
- Großen-Buseck station

General information
- Location: Bahnhofstr. 14, Buseck, Hesse; Germany
- Coordinates: 50°36′19″N 8°46′59″E
- Line: Vogelsberg Railway (km 9.8) (KBS 635)
- Platforms: 2

Construction
- Accessible: Yes
- Architectural style: Heimatstil

Other information
- Station code: 2336
- DS100 code: FGRB
- IBNR: 8002409
- Category: 6
- Fare zone: : 1561
- Website: www.bahnhof.de

History
- Opened: 2 December 1869

Services
Preceding station	Hessische Landesbahn	Following station
Gießen Licher Straße towards Limburg (Lahn)	RB 45	Reiskirchen (Kr Gießen) towards Fulda
Location

Großen Buseck is a station in Buseck in the German state of Hesse. The station is on the Vogelsberg Railway (Gießen–Fulda railway) and has two platforms.

== History ==
The Gießen–Grünberg section was opened on 2 December 1869 by the Upper Hessian Railway Company (Oberhessische Eisenbahn-Gesellschaft). The entrance building was built in Heimatstil (literally "home-style", related to the Swiss chalet style) and is now protected as a cultural monument under the Hessian Monument Protection Act (Hessisches Denkmalschutzgesetz) for historical and urban reasons.

During an air raid on Großen-Buseck station on 18 March 1945, a construction train carrying forced labourers was hit. Four men on the construction train died. One of the forced labourers was hanged on a burnt-out carriage for alleged theft. A memorial stone in front of the station building commemorates this incident.

== Transport services ==
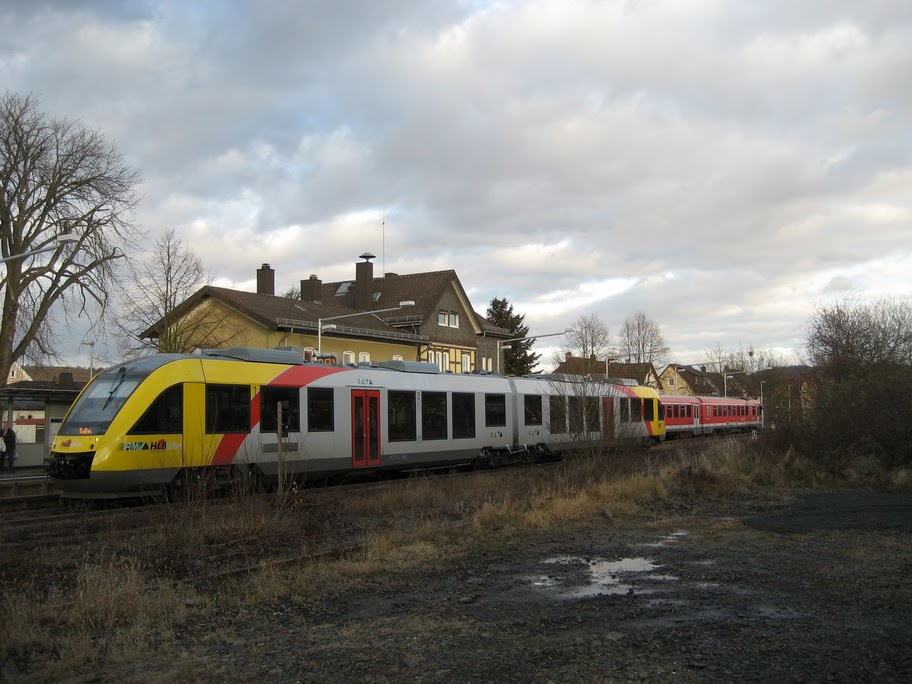
RB 15951 passes through Großen-Buseck on the last day before the change of the operator to HLB

Train fares at the station are set by the Rhein-Main-Verkehrsverbund (RMV).

=== Rail services ===
The station has a platform next to the entrance building and an island platform. It has a train dispatcher who operates the level crossing barriers and blocks passenger access to the island platform depending on the traffic situation. Großen Buseck is served by Regionalbahn services of the Hessische Landesbahn, which operate services on the Vogelsberg Railway. Trains stop at hourly intervals, which is shortened to approximately 30 minutes in the peak.

The loading of timber at Grand Buseck station has been discontinued. However, there are still occasional freight trains to the Gross-Buseck industrial area.

Since the 2016/2017 timetable change on 11 December 2016, services on the Vogelsberg Railway (formerly RB 35) and the subsequent Lahn Valley Railway (formerly RB 25) have run as RB 45.

Line	Route	Interval
RB 45	Regionalbahn; Limburg (Lahn) – Eschhofen – Weilburg – Wetzlar – Gießen – Großen Buseck – Grünberg (Oberhess) – Mücke (Hess) – Alsfeld (Oberhess) – Fulda	Hourly (+ extra trains in peak hour)

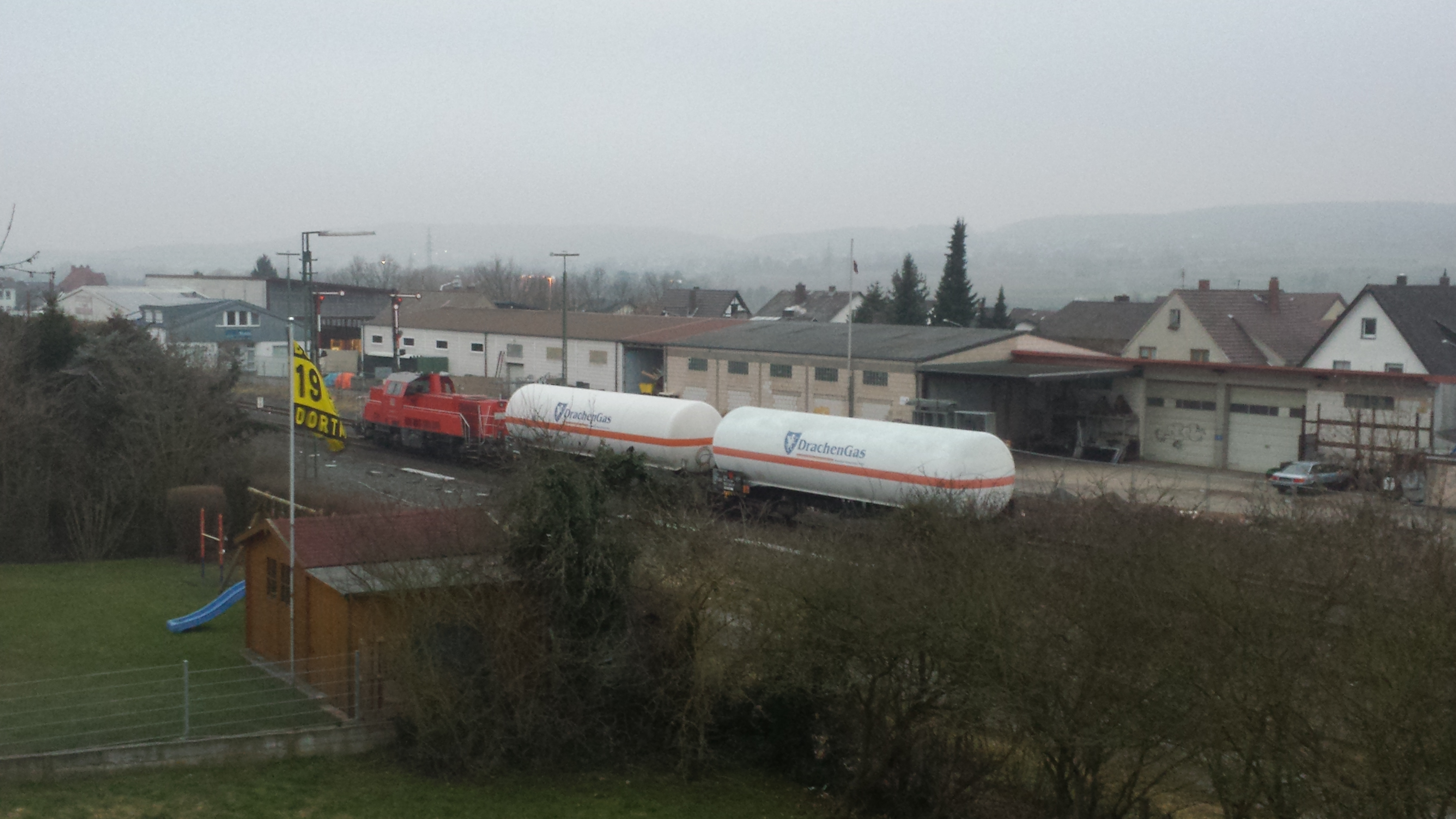
A freight train waits in Großen-Buseck on the way to Gießen.

=== Buses ===
Großen-Buseck is connected by the bus network of the Rhein-Main-Verkehrsverbund: GI-25 to Gießen, GI-27 to Fernwald, GI-26 to Reiskirchen and GI-25 to Grünberg.
