= Gießen Licher Straße station =

Railway station in Gießen, Germany

Gießen Licher Straße
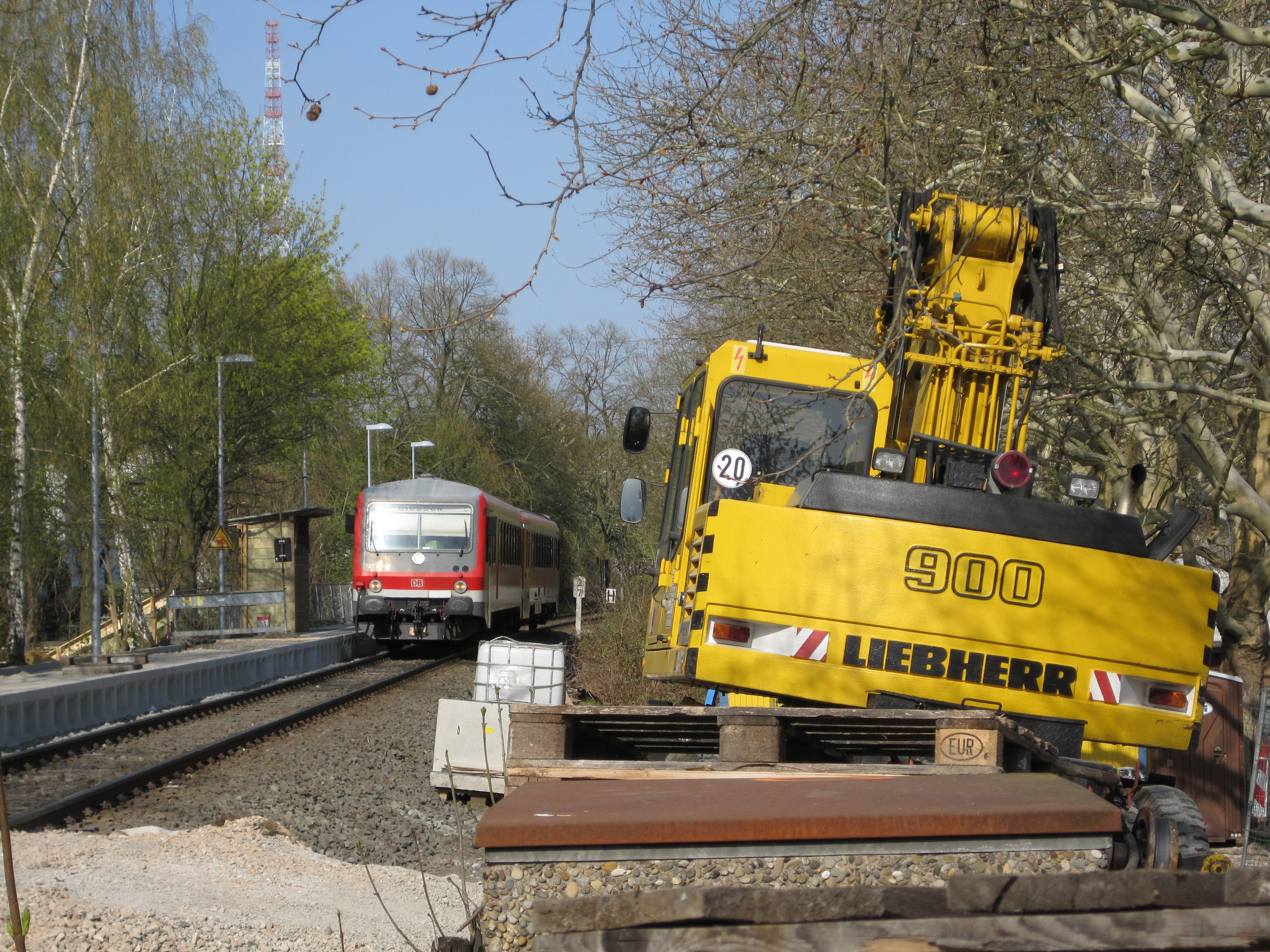

General information
- Location: Licher Str. 1, Gießen Licher Straße, Gießen, Hesse; Germany
- Coordinates: 50°34′53″N 8°41′50″E
- Line: Vogelsberg Railway
- Platforms: 1
- Tracks: 1

Construction
- Accessible: Yes

Other information
- Station code: 2121
- DS100 code: FLST
- IBNR: 8003674
- Category: 6
- Fare zone: : 1501
- Website: www.bahnhof.de

Services
Preceding station	Hessische Landesbahn	Following station
Gießen towards Limburg (Lahn)	RB 45	Großen-Buseck towards Fulda
Location

Gießen Licher Straße is a station in Gießen, Hesse, Germany on the Vogelsberg Railway.

== Rail services ==
The station is served daily by hourly Regionalbahn (RB 45) services on the Limburg (Lahn)–Weilburg–Wetzlar–Gießen–Alsfeld (Oberhess)–Fulda route. In the peak, additional Regionalbahn services run on the Gießen–Grünberg–Mücke route.

Line	Route	Interval
RB 45	Regionalbahn; Limburg (Lahn) – Eschhofen – Weilburg – Wetzlar – Gießen – Gießen Licher Straße – Grünberg (Oberhess) – Mücke (Hess) – Alsfeld (Oberhess) – Fulda	Hourly (+ extra trains in peak hour)
