= Leun/Braunfels station =

Railway station in Leun, Germany

Leun/Braunfels
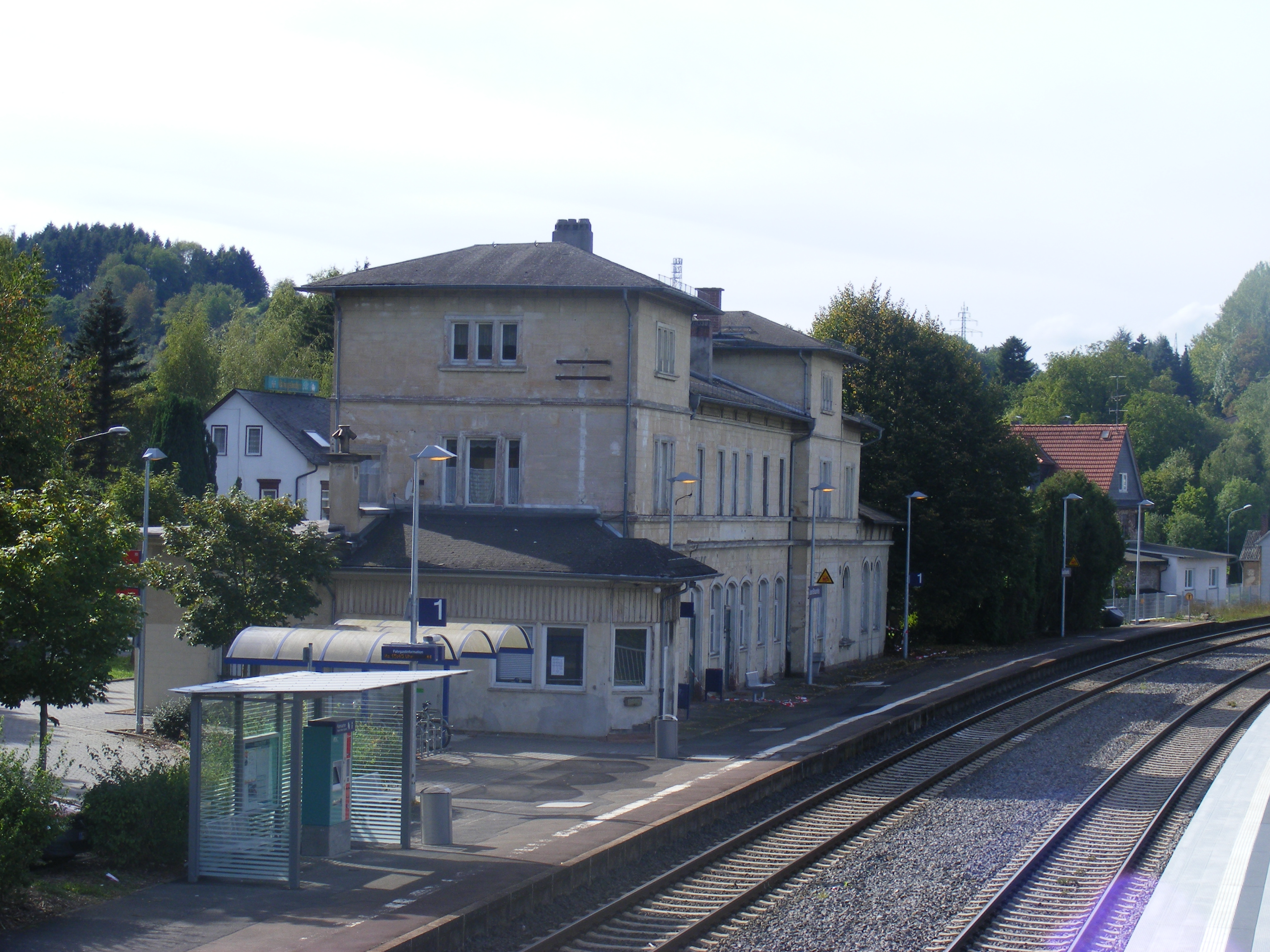
- View of the entrance building and the platforms

General information
- Location: Burgsolmer Str. 3, Lahnbahnhof, Leun, Hesse; Germany
- Coordinates: 50°32′24″N 8°22′01″E
- Lines: Lahn Valley Railway (km 10.7) (625); Ernst Railway (km 0.0) (closed)
- Platforms: 2

Construction
- Accessible: Yes
- Architect: Heinrich Velde

Other information
- Station code: 831
- DS100 code: FBFS
- IBNR: 8001132
- Category: 6
- Fare zone: : 5329
- Website: www.bahnhof.de

History
- Opened: 10 January 1863

Services
Preceding station	Hessische Landesbahn	Following station
Stockhausen (Lahn) towards Limburg (Lahn)	RB 45	Solms (Lahn) towards Fulda
Location

Leun/Braunfels is a heritage-listed station in the district of Lahnbahnhof in the town of Leun in the German state of Hesse. It is in the network of the Rhein-Main-Verkehrsverbund (RMV) and is located on the Lahn Valley Railway (Lahntalbahn). Directly next to the entrance building was the Braunfels terminus of the Ernst Railway (Ernstbahn) to Philippstein of which only a few remains are visible. It operated from 1875 to 1962.

== History ==
The station was opened under the name of Braunfels (Lahn) on 10 January 1863 with the completion of the third stage of the Lahn Valley Railway.

In September 2010, the station was modernised and the station was reclassified as a Haltepunkt (halt). The old island platform was removed and was replaced a new side platform connected by a pedestrian subway. Both platforms have barrier-free access.

The building was sold to a Dutch bidder at an auction for €34,000 on 7 December 2012.

== Infrastructure ==
The station building is located in the Leun district of Lahnbahnhof (“Lahn station”) on Burgsolmser Straße near the old Leun bridge. The neo-classical building was designed by Heinrich Velde and resembles the station buildings of Weilburg and Diez, which also derive from his designs.

It has its windows and doors along seven vertical axes of a side-gabled and plastered building with tower-like elevated avant-corps at each end. These have hip roofs and adjoin the side-gabled structure. While the western avant-corps has four windows, the eastern one has only one window axis; a further side building has been added later.

== Connections ==
The fares of services at the station are set by the Rhein-Main-Verkehrsverbund (RMV).

=== Trains ===
Deutsche Bahn operates Regionalbahn services on the Lahn Valley Railway between Limburg and Gießen, some continuing to Alsfeld and Fulda. These services were operated by Deutsche Bahn until December 2011. Since the timetable change of 2011/2012 on 11 December 2011, the RB services on this section of the Lahn Valley Railway have been operated by Hessische Landesbahn. Alstom Coradia LINT 41 (class 648) sets are used. The Regional-Express (RE 25) services run through the station without stopping. The Regional-Express (RE 25) services are operated with LINT 27 and 41 (class 640 and 648) railcars and Bombardier Talent (class 643) sets. The cities of Limburg, Weilburg, Wetzlar and Gießen can be reached from here without changing trains.

The following service stops in Leun/Braunfels station:

Line	Route	Interval
RB 45	Regionalbahn; Limburg (Lahn) – Eschhofen – Weilburg – Leun/Braunfels – Wetzlar – Gießen (– Grünberg (Oberhess) – Mücke (Hess) – Alsfeld (Oberhess) – Fulda)	Hourly (+ extra trains in peak hour)

=== Buses ===
Bus route 180 serves Leun and Braunfels. The departure times are coordinated with rail services on the Lahn Valley Railway. Connections are available from Monday to Friday and on Saturday afternoons. In addition, bus route 120 operates several times a day between Holzhausen and Solms and stops at the station.
