= Lehnheim station =

Railway station in Germany

Lehnheim

General information
- Location: Am Kammerpfad 33, Lehnheim, Hesse; Germany
- Coordinates: 50°36′24″N 8°59′30″E
- Line: Vogelsberg Railway
- Platforms: 1

Construction
- Accessible: Yes

Other information
- Station code: 3616
- DS100 code: FLEH
- IBNR: 8003612
- Category: 7
- Fare zone: : 1475
- Website: www.bahnhof.de

Services
Preceding station	Hessische Landesbahn	Following station
Grünberg towards Limburg (Lahn)	RB 45	Mücke (Hesse) towards Fulda
Location

Lehnheim (German: Bahnhof Lehnheim) is a station in Lehnheim, Hesse, Germany on the Vogelsberg Railway (Gießen – Fulda).

== Rail services ==
The station is served daily by hourly Regionalbahn (RB 45) services on the Limburg (Lahn)–Weilburg–Wetzlar–Gießen–Alsfeld (Oberhess)–Fulda route operated by Hessische Landesbahn. In the peak, additional Regionalbahn services run on the Gießen–Grünberg–Mücke route.

Line	Route	Interval
RB 45	Regionalbahn; Limburg (Lahn) – Eschhofen – Weilburg – Wetzlar – Gießen – Grünberg (Oberhess) – Lehnheim – Mücke (Hess) – Alsfeld (Oberhess) – Fulda	Hourly; Every 2 hours on Saturdays, Sundays and public holidays
