= Albshausen station =

Railway station in Solms, Germany

Albshausen
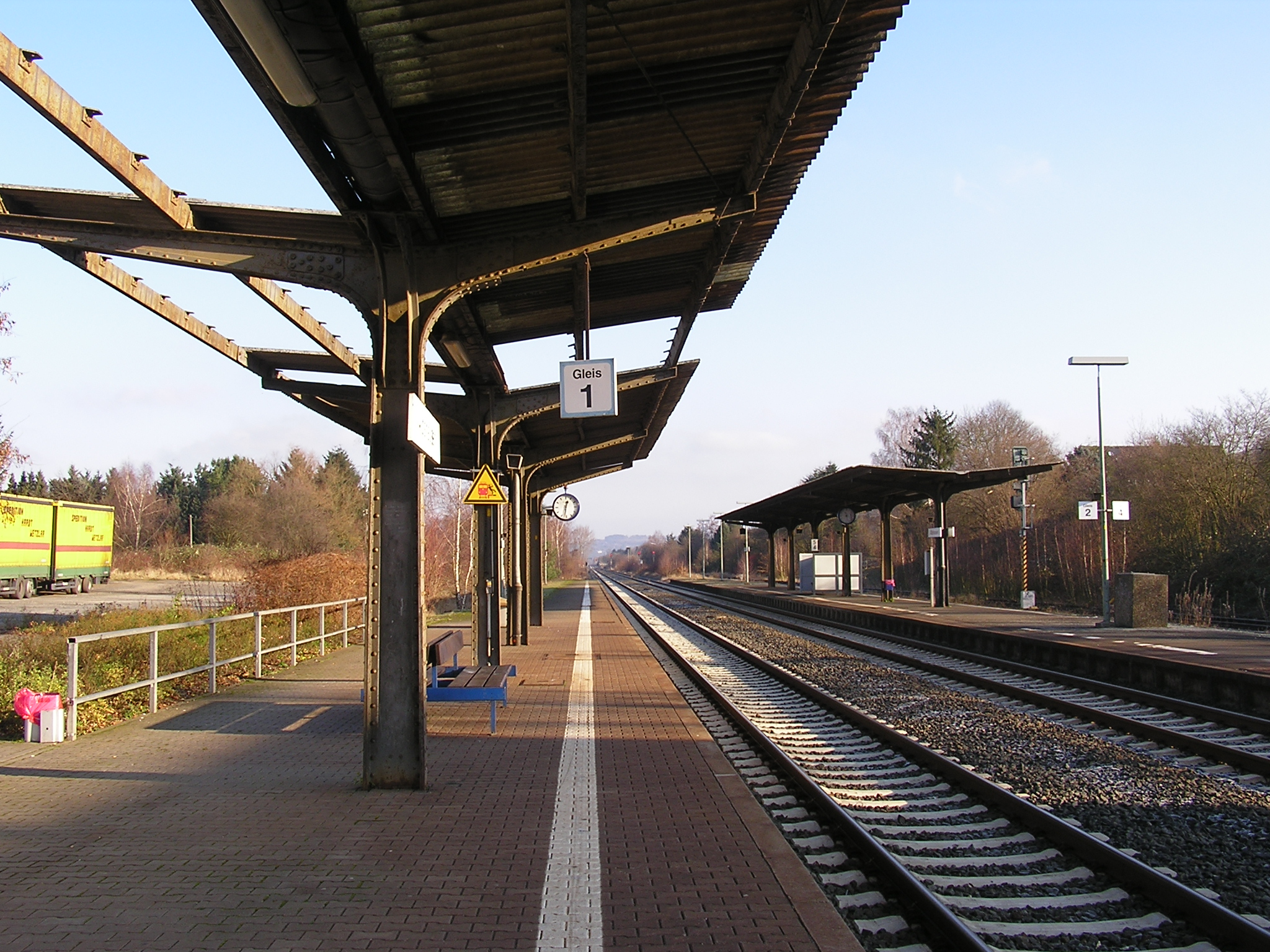
- Albshausen station

General information
- Location: Am Bahnhof 62, Albshausen, Solms, Hesse; Germany
- Coordinates: 50°32′45″N 8°26′09″E
- Lines: Lahn Valley Railway (km 5.5) (625); Solmsbach Valley Railway (km 53.29) (closed)
- Platforms: 3

Construction
- Accessible: Platform 1 only
- Architect: Heinrich Velde

Other information
- Station code: 46
- DS100 code: FALS
- IBNR: 800471
- Category: 6
- Fare zone: : 5316
- Website: www.bahnhof.de

History
- Opened: 10 January 1863

Services
| Preceding station | Hessische Landesbahn | Following station |
|---|---|---|
| Solms (Lahn) towards Limburg (Lahn) | RB 45 | Wetzlar towards Fulda |
Location

Albshausen is a station in the north of the district of Albshausen in the town of Solms in the German state of Hesse. The station is located on the Lahn Valley Railway (Lahntalbahn) and only a few metres from the Lahn river. Previously, the Solmsbach Valley Railway (Solmsbachtalbahn) branched off to Gravenwiesbach.

== History ==
The station was opened on 10 January 1863 with the completion of the third section of the Lahn Valley Railway. In 1908, a ropeway conveyor with a length of 3 km was built from the nearby Fortuna iron ore mine to the station. The ore mined there was transported by rail to blast furnaces in the Ruhr area. Until 1962, the mine railway from the southern end of the Laubach iron ore mine ended at the station and the opencast Schlagkatz mine in Oberbiel used the station as a transhipment point. From 1912, the Solmsbach Valley Railway branched off at Albshausen station towards Graevenwiesbach via Brandoberndorf. There was passenger traffic there from 1 November 1912 to 31 May 1985. Freight traffic on the line stopped on 28 May 1988 and it has been largely dismantled. Until April 1986, the points and signals were operated by two mechanical signal boxes. A head and side ramp as well as a weighbridge were used for the handling of goods traffic. In August 2016, the sidings and six turnouts were renewed so that they can be used again after more than ten years' disuse.

== Connections ==
The fares of services at the station are set by the Rhein-Main-Verkehrsverbund (RMV).

=== Trains ===
Deutsche Bahn operates Regionalbahn services on the Lahn Valley Railway between Limburg and Gießen, some continuing to Alsfeld and Fulda. These services were operated by Deutsche Bahn until December 2011. Since the timetable change of 2011/2012 on 11 December 2011, the RB services on this section of the Lahn Valley Railway have been operated by Hessische Landesbahn. Alstom Coradia LINT 41 (class 648) sets are used. The Regional-Express (RE 25) services run through the station without stopping. The Regional-Express (RE 25) services are operated with LINT 27 and 41 (class 640 and 648) railcars and Bombardier Talent (class 643) sets. Albshausen station is to be comprehensively refurbished in the coming years.

The following service stops in Albshausen station:

| Line | Route | Interval |
|---|---|---|
| RB 45 | Regionalbahn; Limburg (Lahn) – Eschhofen – Weilburg – Albshausen – Wetzlar – Gießen (– Grünberg (Oberhess) – Mücke (Hess) – Alsfeld (Oberhess) – Fulda) | Hourly (+ extra trains in peak hour) |

=== Buses ===
Bus route 185 connects Albshäusen station with Braunfels ( Braunfels Europaplatz stop) and Wetzlar (Wetzlar Busbahnhof stop). The service runs half-hourly on working days and every 15 minutes in the peak, but on weekends it runs every two hours.
