= Beuern =

Beuern is the name of some German municipalities. It may refer to:

- Benediktbeuern, Bavaria
- Buseck, Hesse
