= Grünberg station =

Railway station in Grünberg, Germany

Grünberg (Oberhess)
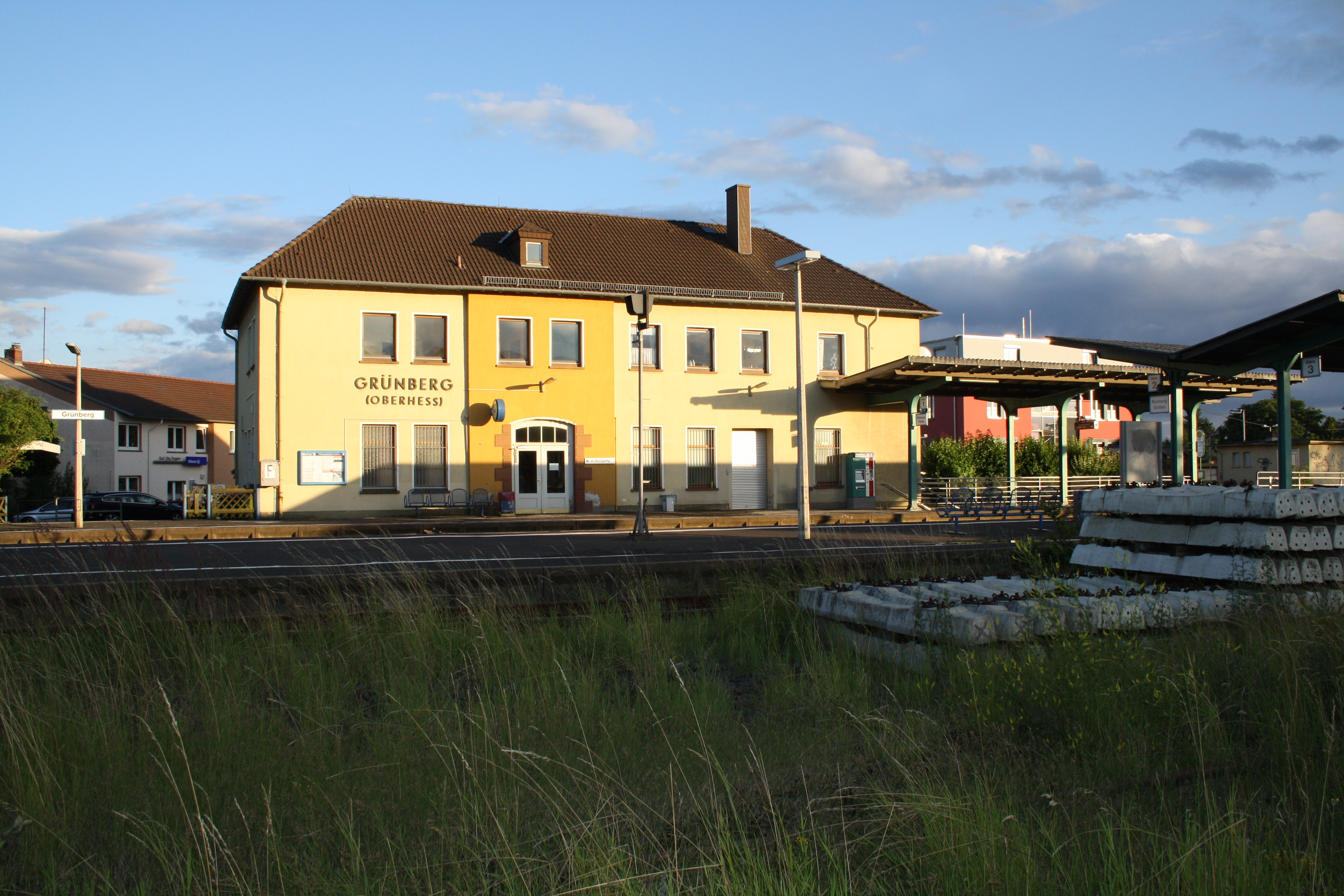

General information
- Location: Bahnhofstr. 36, Grünberg, Hesse; Germany
- Coordinates: 50°35′47″N 8°57′33″E
- Line: Vogelsberg Railway
- Platforms: 2

Construction
- Accessible: Yes

Other information
- Station code: 2121
- DS100 code: FGRG
- IBNR: 8002439
- Category: 6
- Fare zone: : 1455
- Website: www.bahnhof.de

History
- Opened: 29 December 1869

Services
Preceding station	Hessische Landesbahn	Following station
Göbelnrod towards Limburg (Lahn)	RB 45	Lehnheim towards Fulda
Location

Grünberg (Oberhess) is a station in the town of Grünberg in the German state of Hesse. The stations of Lehnheim and Göbelnrod are also in Grünberg. It is located 23.2 kilometres from Gießen station on the Vogelsberg Railway (Vogelsbergbahn), which continues to Fulda. In the past, the Lumda Valley Railway (Lumdatalbahn) to Londorf and Lollar branched off here and the Butzbach–Lich railway to Butzbach via Lich and Münzenberg.

== History ==
Grünberg station was opened with the first section of the Vogelsberg Railway from Giessen to Grünberg on 29 December 1869. Half a year later, the Vogelsberg Railway was extended to Alsfeld.

In 1896 the Lumda Valley Railway was opened via Londorf to Lollar. Thus, Grünberg became a regional railway hub with heavy traffic. The Lumda Valley Railway was operated exclusively for regional passenger and freight traffic. From the start of the operation, most of the trains ran through Lollar to Gießen. The Londorf–Grünberg section was closed down on 26 May 1963, and dismantled in 1965. This section has been used as an extension of the Lumda–Wieseck cycling trail since 2010.

On 1 August 1909, the Butzbach–Lich railway (also known as the Wettertalbahn—Wetter Valley Railway) was finished with the extension from Lich to Grünberg. This had its own station, called Grünberg Süd, near Grünberg station. The Lich–Grünberg line was closed on 4 October 1953.

== Station area ==
=== Entrance building ===
The entrance building of Grünberg station is a two-storey building. It now houses a travel centre of Verkehrsgesellschaft Oberhessen (Transport Company of Upper Hesse, VGO). It was offered for sale on 30 September 2016.

=== Platforms ===
Grünberg station has two platforms, platform 1 (next to the station building) and platform 2 on an island platform. Trains on platform 1 run towards Mücke, Alsfeld and Fulda. Trains on platform 2 run to Reiskirchen, Großen-Buseck and Gießen. Trains formerly ran from platform 3 towards Londorf and Lollar. Due to the dismantling of the sets of points towards Gießen, this platform track is currently unused.

=== Freight yard ===
The freight yard is connected to the tracks of Grünberg station. This has two overgrown tracks. In addition to the tracks, there is a large freight shed, which is no longer used. It was offered for sale with the entrance building on 30 September 2016.

== Connections ==
Train fares at the station are set by the Rhein-Main-Verkehrsverbund (RMV).

The station is served daily by hourly Regionalbahn services on the Limburg (Lahn)–Weilburg–Wetzlar–Gießen–Alsfeld (Oberhess)–Fulda route. In the peak, additional Regionalbahn services run on the Gießen–Grünberg–Mücke route, two of which end in Grünberg.

Since the 2016/2017 timetable change on 11 December 2016, services on the Vogelsberg Railway (formerly RB 35) and the subsequent Lahn Valley Railway (formerly RB 25) have run as RB 45.

Line	Route	Interval
RB 45	Regionalbahn; Limburg (Lahn) – Eschhofen – Weilburg – Wetzlar – Gießen – Grünberg (Oberhess) – Mücke (Hess) – Alsfeld (Oberhess) – Fulda	Hourly (+ extra trains in peak hour)

=== Buses ===
Grünberg station is served by several bus lines that connect the town and the surrounding area. In addition, the Vogelsberger Vulkan-Express operates from 1 May to the end of October each year.
