= DB Services =

- Industry: Rail
- Services: Building maintenance, facility management
- Number of employees: 13,000 (2009)
- Parent: Deutsche Bahn AG

DB Services is a subsidiary organisation of Deutsche Bahn AG consisting of six regional divisions which are responsible for the maintenance of the buildings of the railway infrastructure (e.g. railway stations).

The regional divisions provide services such as vehicle and building cleaning, maintenance of buildings, real estate management, provision of transport and the management of roads.

The group is part of the DB Dienstleistungen division of Deutsche Bahn.

== Regional divisions ==
DB Services was divided into six companies:

- DB Services Nord GmbH
- DB Services Nordost GmbH
- DB Services Süd GmbH
- DB Services Südost GmbH
- DB Services Südwest GmbH
- DB Services West GmbH DB

As of 2012 the company retains six regional operating divisions.

The companies provide real estate and facility management, including industrial and technical building management, including maintenance, staffing, waste management and cleaning, as well as specialised airport management services, and railway specific services including permanent way maintenance and rail specific safety procedures.
