= Mücke (Hesse) station =

Railway station in Germany

Mücke (Hess)

General information
- Location: Bahnhofstr. 102, Mücke, Hesse; Germany
- Coordinates: 50°37′00″N 9°01′43″E
- Lines: Vogelsberg Railway (km 28.9); Friedberg–Mücke railway (km 49.2) (closed)
- Platforms: 1

Construction
- Accessible: Yes

Other information
- Station code: 4193
- DS100 code: BMC
- IBNR: 8004100
- Category: 6
- Fare zone: : 0909
- Website: www.bahnhof.de

History
- Opened: 29 July 1870

Services
Preceding station	Hessische Landesbahn	Following station
Lehnheim towards Limburg (Lahn)	RB 45	Nieder Ohmen towards Fulda
Location
- Location within Hesse Location within Germany Location within Europe

Mücke (Hesse) station is a Keilbahnhof ("wedge station") and, along with Nieder Ohmen station, is one of two remaining stations in the municipality of Mücke, Hesse, Germany. It is located between the two Mücke districts of Flensungen and Merlau, 28.9 kilometres from Gießen on the Vogelsberg Railway (Vogelsbergbahn), which continues to Fulda. Previously, the Friedberg–Mücke railway branched off here via Laubach and Hungen to Friedberg.

== History ==
Mücke station was opened with the second section of the Vogelsberg Railway from Grünberg to Alsfeld, which was completed on 29 July 1870.

The Laubach–Mücke section of the Friedberg–Mücke railway was completed on 1 November 1903.

In the middle of March 1945, a train carrying a 10.5 centimetre anti-aircraft gun, a two-centimetre quadruple anti-aircraft gun along with crew and ammunition wagons stood on a track of Mücke station and a train carrying people to a concentration camp stood on a different track. 16 Thunderbolt bombers attacked the station and the stopped trains. The station was largely destroyed, the wagons carrying anti-aircraft ammunition exploded and four anti-aircraft troops and four concentration camp prisoners were killed.

Traffic on the Freienseen–Mücke section was abandoned on 31 May 1958. Passenger services between Hungen and Freienseen and freight traffic between Laubach and Freienseen were discontinued on 31 May 1959 and this section was then closed and dismantled in 1960.

Since the timetable change 2011/2012 on 11 December 2011, passenger services have been operated by the Hessische Landesbahn GmbH (HLB) with LINT 41 diesel multiple units.

== Station infrastructure ==
=== Entrance building ===
The entrance building of Mücke station is a two-storey building. It now houses a signal box and offices, from which the rail operations in the station are controlled.

=== Platforms ===
Mücke station has two platforms, platform 1 (next to the station building) and platform 2 on an island platform. Due to the absence of trains crossing at the station, trains do not stop at platform 2 and all trains now stop at platform 1. There are also two partly overgrown tracks without platforms.

The route from Hungen ran along the eastern side of the entrance building (now used as a commuter parking area) and joined the Vogelsberg Railway at the 29.1 km mark (approximately at the location of the existing signal). Part of the remaining track is still present, but completely overgrown. This track was still used as a loading track until the beginning of the 2000s.

== Connections ==
Train fares at the station are set by the Rhein-Main-Verkehrsverbund (RMV).

The station is served daily by hourly Regionalbahn services on the Limburg (Lahn)–Weilburg–Wetzlar–Gießen–Alsfeld (Oberhess)–Fulda route. In the peak, additional Regionalbahn services run on the Gießen–Grünberg–Mücke route. Thus, in the peak, services run between Gießen and Mücke stations about every 30 minutes.

Since the 2016/2017 timetable change on 11 December 2016, services on the Vogelsberg Railway (formerly RB 35) and the subsequent Lahn Valley Railway (formerly RB 25) have run as RB 45.

Line	Route	Interval
RB 45	Regionalbahn; Limburg (Lahn) – Eschhofen – Weilburg – Wetzlar – Gießen – Grünberg (Oberhess) – Mücke (Hess) – Alsfeld (Oberhess) – Fulda	Hourly

Mücke station is served by several bus routes that run through the municipality and the individual districts, all operated by Verkehrsgesellschaft Oberhessen (VGO).

The following bus routes start at the station: VB-75, VB-76, VB-78, and VB-79. The SEV-35 (a supplement to rail services), which is an additional service of RB 45, uses this station as an entry and exit only. The route starts in Alsfeld (Oberhessen) and it ends in Giessen.

In addition, from 1 May to the end of October every year, route VB-92 of the tourist operator Vogelsberger Vulkan-Express runs from Grünberg, Baumgartenfeld via Grünberg, Schloß, Mücke, Mücke station, Ulrichstein, and Lindenplatz to Hoherodskopf.

== Notes ==
=== Sources ===
- Dieter Eckert (1990). "100 Jahre Eisenbahn Hungen – Laubach". Lok-Magazin (in German). 29 (164). Stuttgart.
