= Buseck =

- Municipality
- Coat of arms

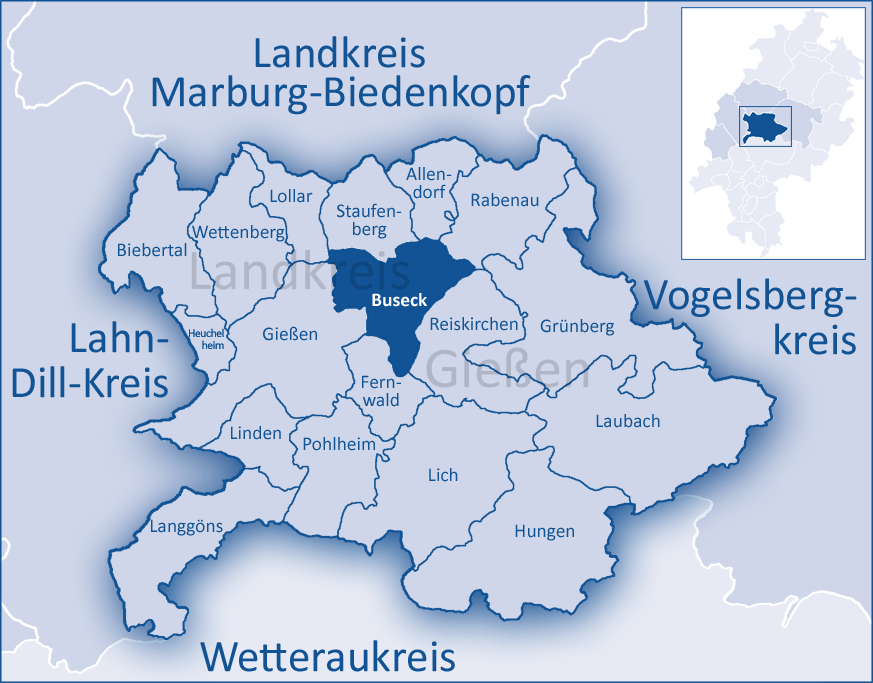
- Location of Buseck within Gießen district
- Interactive map of Buseck
- Location within Germany Location within Hesse
- Coordinates: 50°36′N 08°46′E
- Country: Germany
- State: Hesse
- Admin. region: Gießen
- District: Gießen

Government
  - Mayor (2021–27): Michael Ranft (CDU)

Area
  - Total: 38.67 km^{2} (14.93 sq mi)
- Elevation: 227 m (745 ft)

Population (2025-12-31)
  - Total: 12,550
  - Density: 324.5/km^{2} (840.6/sq mi)
- Time zone: UTC+01:00 (CET)
  - Summer (DST): UTC+02:00 (CEST)
- Postal codes: 35418
- Dialling codes: 06408
- Vehicle registration: GI
- Website: www.buseck.de

Buseck is a municipality in the district of Gießen, in Hessen, Germany. It is situated 7 km northeast of Gießen. The villages in this municipality include Großen-Buseck, Beuern, Alten-Buseck, Oppenrod, and Trohe.

Großen-Buseck is the largest village, with 5.768 inhabitants. Trohe is the smallest, with 753 inhabitants.
