= Gießen–Fulda railway =

Railway line in Germany

Gießen–Fulda
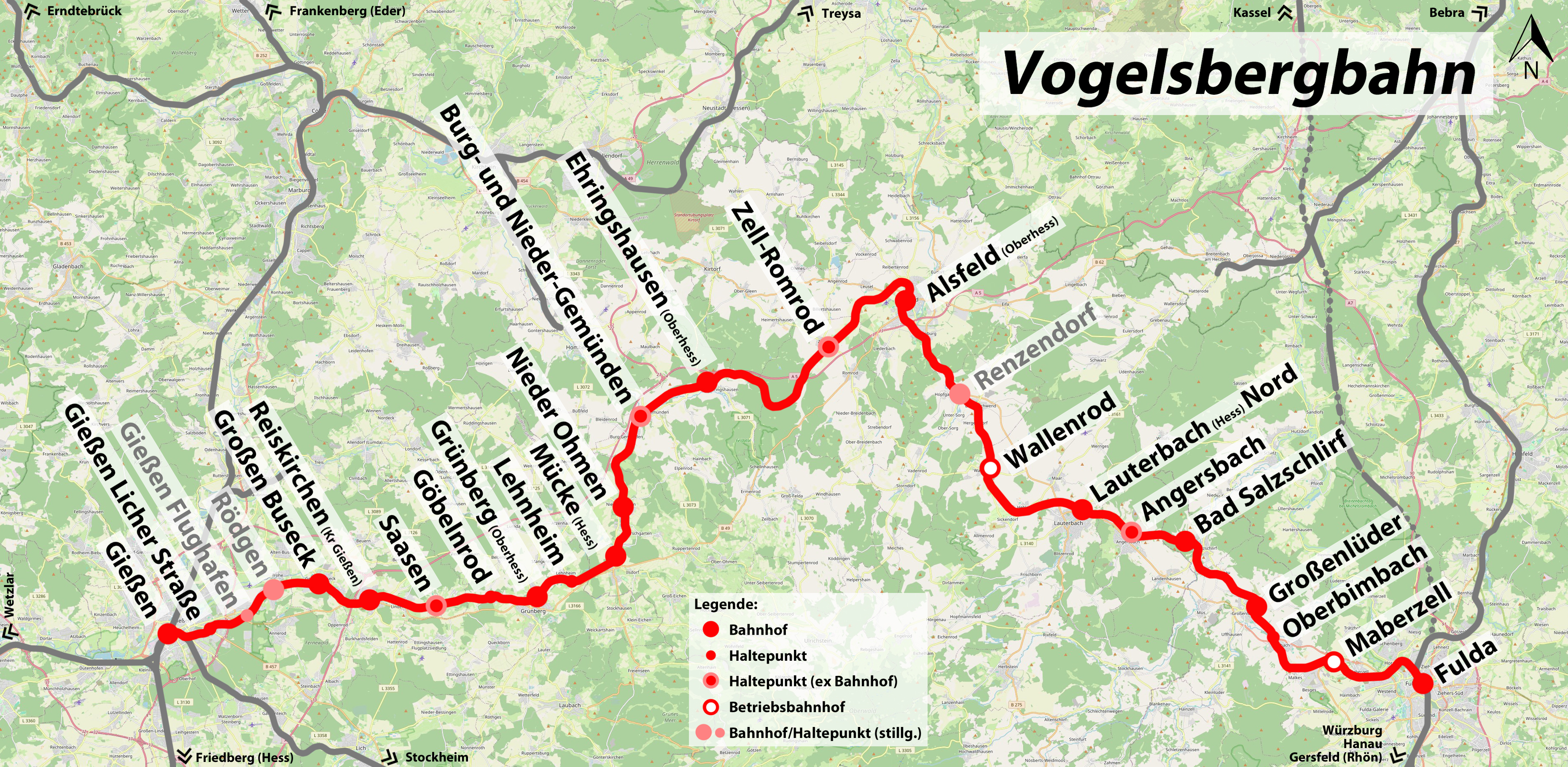

Overview
- Native name: Vogelsbergbahn
- Line number: 3700
- Locale: Hesse, Germany
- Termini: Gießen; Fulda

Service
- Route number: 635

Technical
- Line length: 105.9 km (65.8 mi)
- Track gauge: 1,435 mm (4 ft 8 1/2 in) standard gauge
- Operating speed: 120 km/h (75 mph) (maximum)

The Gießen–Fulda railway (also known in German as the Vogelsbergbahn—"Vogelsberg Railway") is a single-track main line from Gießen via Alsfeld to Fulda in the German state of Hesse.

== Name ==
The name of the Vogelsberg Railway was originally used for the now closed and dismantled branch line between Stockheim and Lauterbach. In contrast to today's Vogelsberg railway the original line actually ran through the middle of the Vogelsberg Mountains, but today it is usually called the Oberwald Railway (Oberwaldbahn).

== Route ==
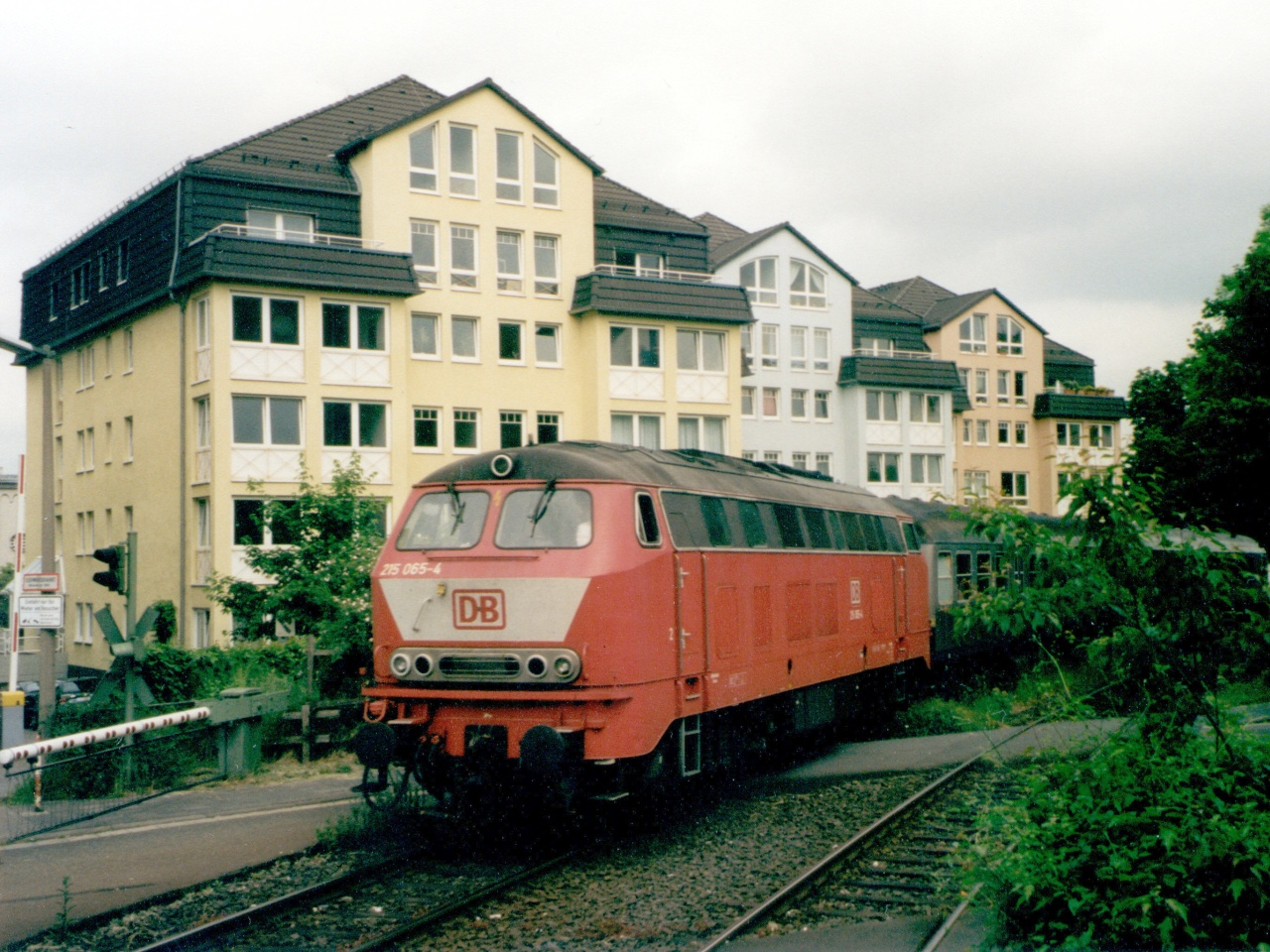
Locomotive 215 065–4 on 25 May 1999 in Gießen with RB 8422 from Fulda

The line is 105.9 km long. Its speed limit, since it was upgraded in 2011, is 120 km/h instead of the previous 90 km/h. It has 109 level crossings.

One of the reasons for the many bends of the line is to link the many communities on the route. Secondly, many slopes are overcome during the course of the 106 kilometre route, of which only 13 km is level.

== History ==
The project to connect the Main-Weser Railway and the Bebra Railway had been considered since the 1860s: in 1863, the parliament of the Grand Duchy of Hesse had considered relevant plans. The licence for its construction and operation was granted on behalf of the Grand Duchy of Hesse on 4 April 1868 and the Upper Hessian Railway Company (Oberhessische Eisenbahn-Gesellschaft) was founded as a public company, with assistance from the Frankfurt banking house, Erlanger & Söhne. This was complemented by a treaty between the Grand Duchy and the Kingdom of Prussia, as the line also ran through Prussian territory. The project was developed jointly with the Lahn-Kinzig Railway and implemented in the next two years.

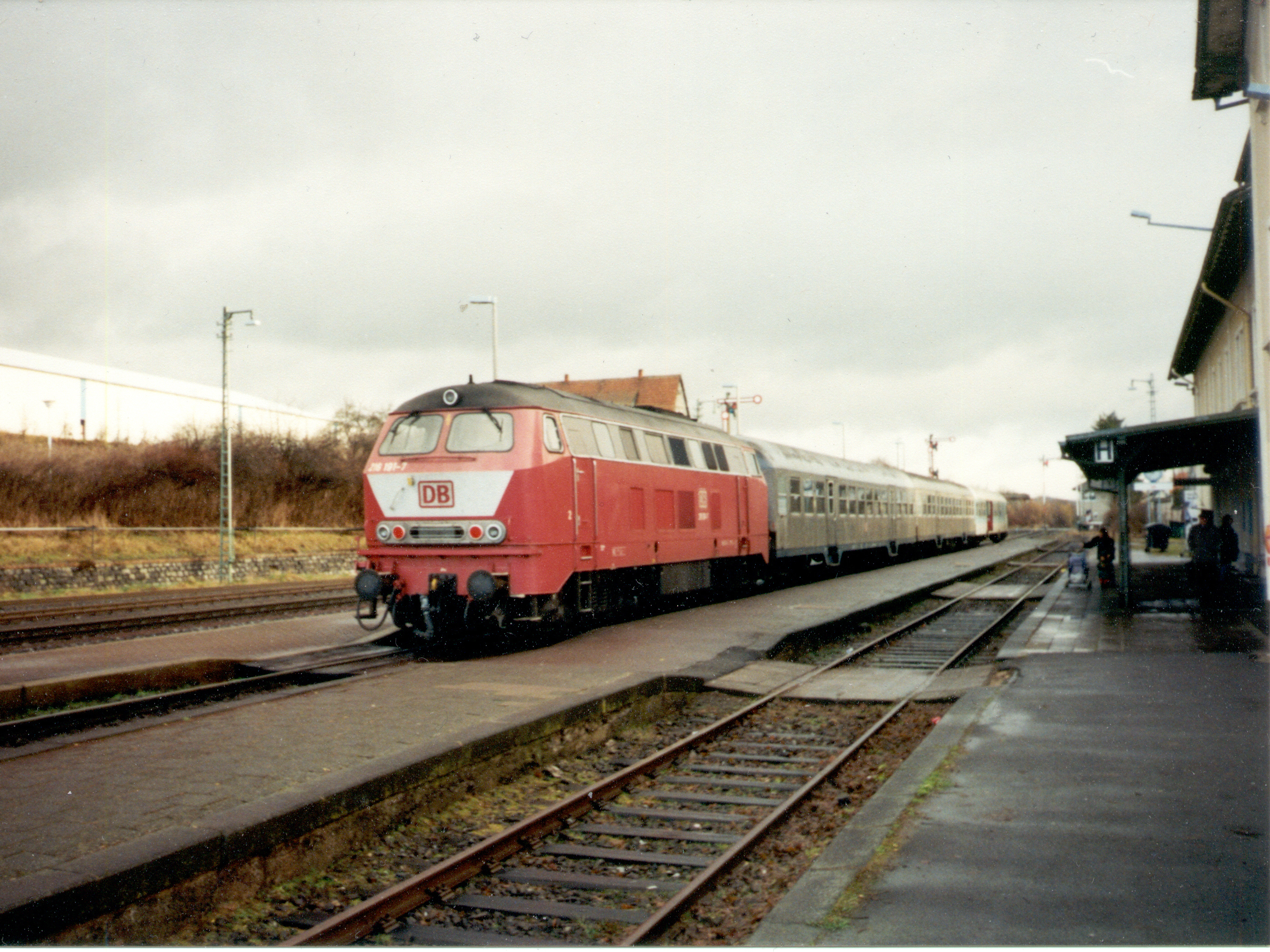
Locomotive 216 191 in Lauterbach Nord on 13 December 1997 with RB 8409 from Gießen

Section	Opening dates
Gießen–Grünberg	29 December 1869
Grünberg–Alsfeld	29 July 1870
Alsfeld–Lauterbach	30 October 1870
Lauterbach–Bad Salzschlirf	31 December 1870
Bad Salzschlirf–Fulda	31 July 1871

The relatively sparsely populated areas crossed by the line and the absence of significant long-distance freight traffic meant that the Vogelsberg railway was mainly limited to regional traffic. That meant that the line was built as a single track line, although various engineering structures were prepared for the building of a second track.

The Upper Hessian Railway Company was nationalised in 1876 and its operations were taken over by the Grand Duchy of Hesse State Railways (Großherzoglich Hessische Staatseisenbahnen).

In the course of the discussions about connections from Fulda to the new Hanover–Würzburg high-speed railway that were considered in the first half of the 1970s, one option would have connected from Fulda to the new line running north via a two track grade-separated junction east of Unterbimbach on the Vogelsberg railway. Eventually the high-speed line was built directly to Fulda station.

=== Development ===
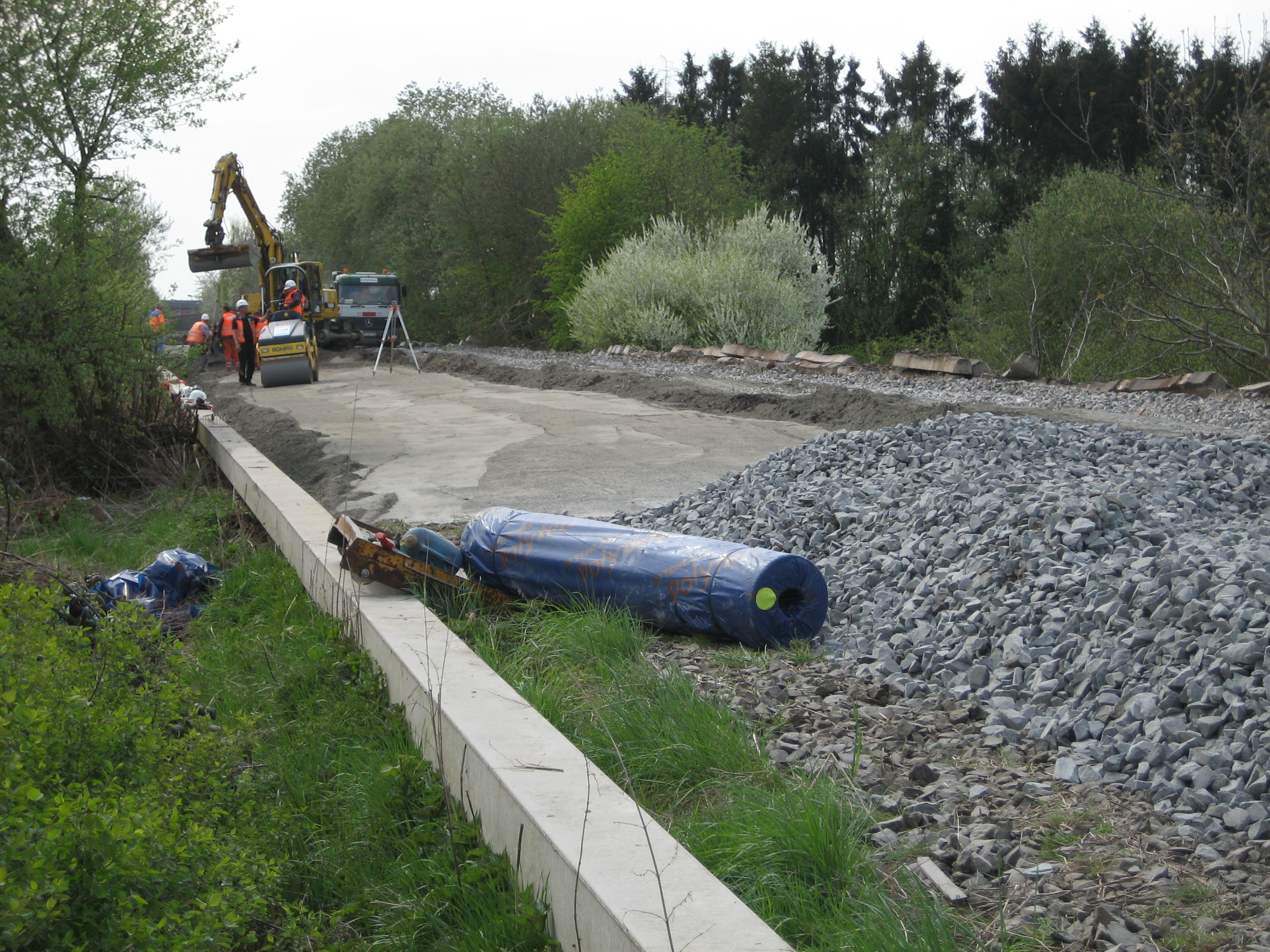
Renewal of infrastructure at Gießen-Rödgen during Easter 2011

The single track, along with the lack of crossing facilities (as the result of the demolition of former stations) and outdated equipment were in the past a common cause of delays, so various construction projects (such as the construction of crossing facilities and the renewal of signalling equipment) were planned. The Federal government made funds of €30 million for an upgrade of the line in the period from 2003 to 2007. This work was not supported by Deutsche Bahn and was not implemented.

On 10 June 2008, a meeting in Grünberg of the neighbouring municipalities and the cities of Fulda and Gießen adopted an issues paper produced by DB Netz and agreed to try to get improvements made to the Vogelsberg Railway. Among other things, the infrastructure would be improved to make it possible to offer an attractive service, despite the limited resources. From 2012, the operations of services would be put to open tender.

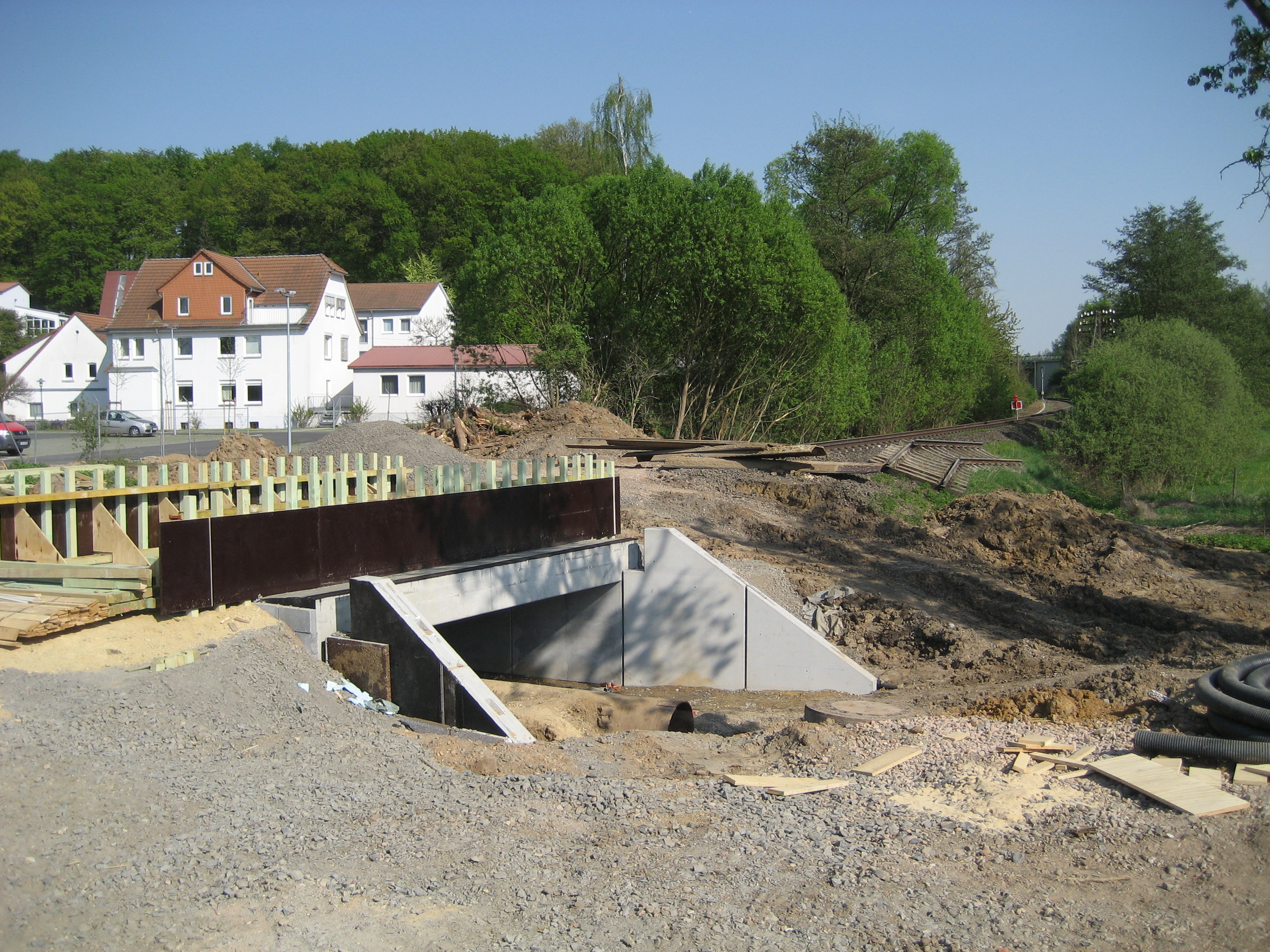
Reconstruction of a bridge east of Buseck during Easter 2011

In September 2009, the CEO of Deutsche Bahn, Rüdiger Grube announced that €24.6 million would be spent up to 2011 from the economic stimulus package on the Vogelsberg railway. Renzendorf and Wallenrod stations were abandoned under the new plan of operations. The modernisation work started with partial line closures from 19 July to 15 August 2010 on the Alsfeld–Fulda section, continuing from 11 May to 24 October on the Mücke–Alsfeld section. From 27 December 2010 to 9 January 2011 renewal was scheduled for the Gießen–Grünberg section, including two bridges, but was not possible because of the weather conditions. This work was carried out from 16 April to 1 May 2011 together with work on the Alsfeld–Wallenrod section. From 2 to 8 May 2011 there was also work on the Mücke–Alsfeld section to renew parts of the embankment. The work was completed in the summer of 2011, when in addition signals at 61 level crossings were adapted to increase the top speed to 120 km/h.

== Traffic ==
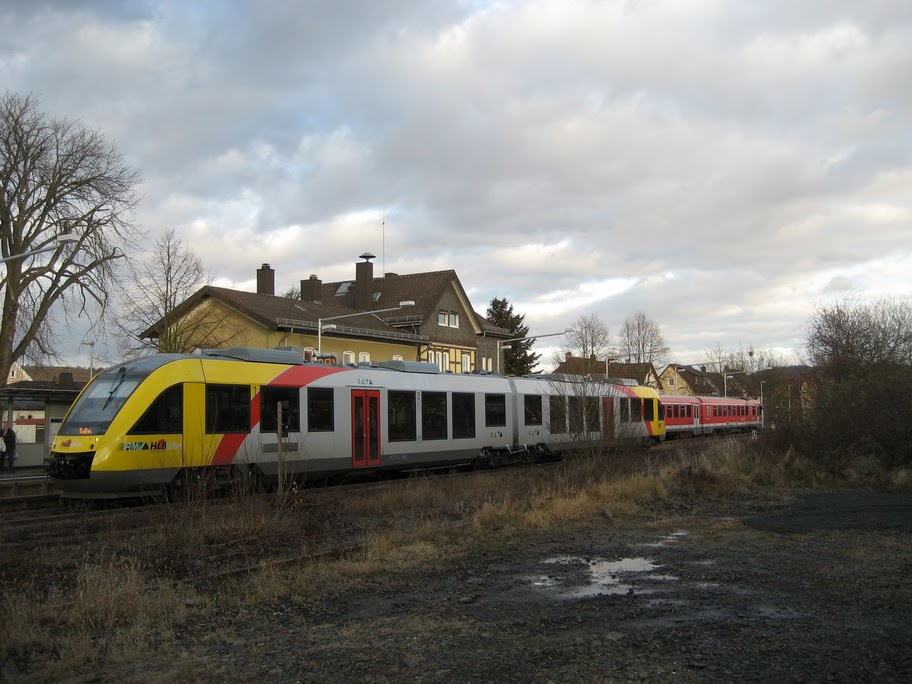
RB 15951 runs through Großen-Buseck on the last day before HLB takes over

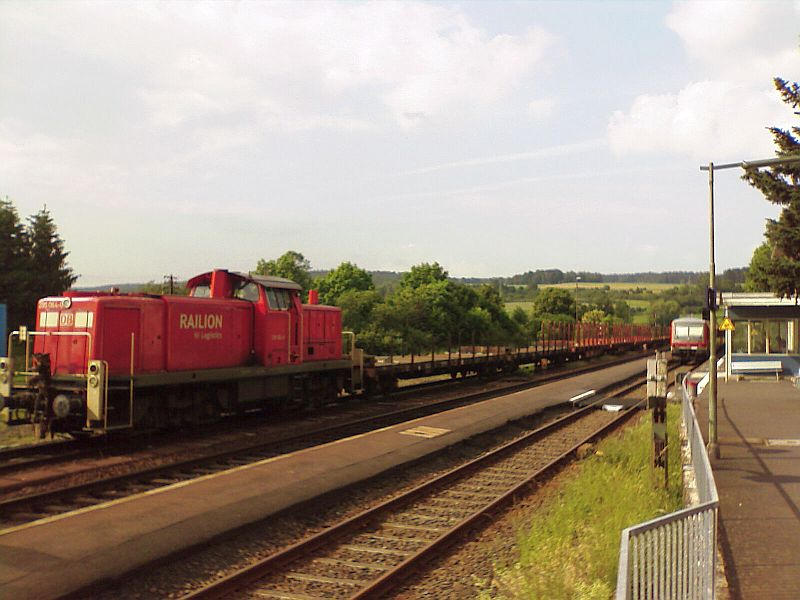
Freight train in Großenlüder station

In the past passenger services were provided by trains hauled by locomotives of classes 211, of 212 and 216 or by Uerdingen railbuses (class 796/798). Class 628 diesel multiple units operated from the late 1980s. When locomotive-hauled trains were still ran, they were hauled by class 215 or 218 locomotives, but only DMUs have run on the line since the beginning of the millennium. Since December 2011, passenger services have been operated by the Hessische Landesbahn with LINT 41 DMUs, which replaced some of the class 628s in October 2011.

Until December 2011, Regional-Express services operated on the Vogelsberg line to between Gießen and Fulda every two hours on weekdays and every four hours on Sundays. Under the December 2006 timetable some of these trains ran to Limburg via the Lahntal railway. Regionalbahn services operated on the Gießen–Alsfeld and Alsfeld–Fulda sections every two hours on weekdays.

Since the timetable change 2011/2012 on 11 December 2011, the Vogelsberg line has been served generally hourly by Regionalbahn services between Gießen and Fulda. These services are operated by the Hessische Landesbahn GmbH (HLB) with LINT 41 diesel multiple units. Since the 2016/2017 timetable change on 11 December 2016, services on the Vogelsberg Railway (formerly RB 35) and the subsequent Lahntal railway (formerly RB 25) have run as RB 45.

Because the track is single track and its full capacity is used by passenger trains it is hardly possible to operate special trains or freight traffic. Freight traffic is confined to the Gießen–Großen-Buseck and Fulda–Großenlüder sections.
