= Gießen station =

Railway station in Hesse, Germany

Gießen
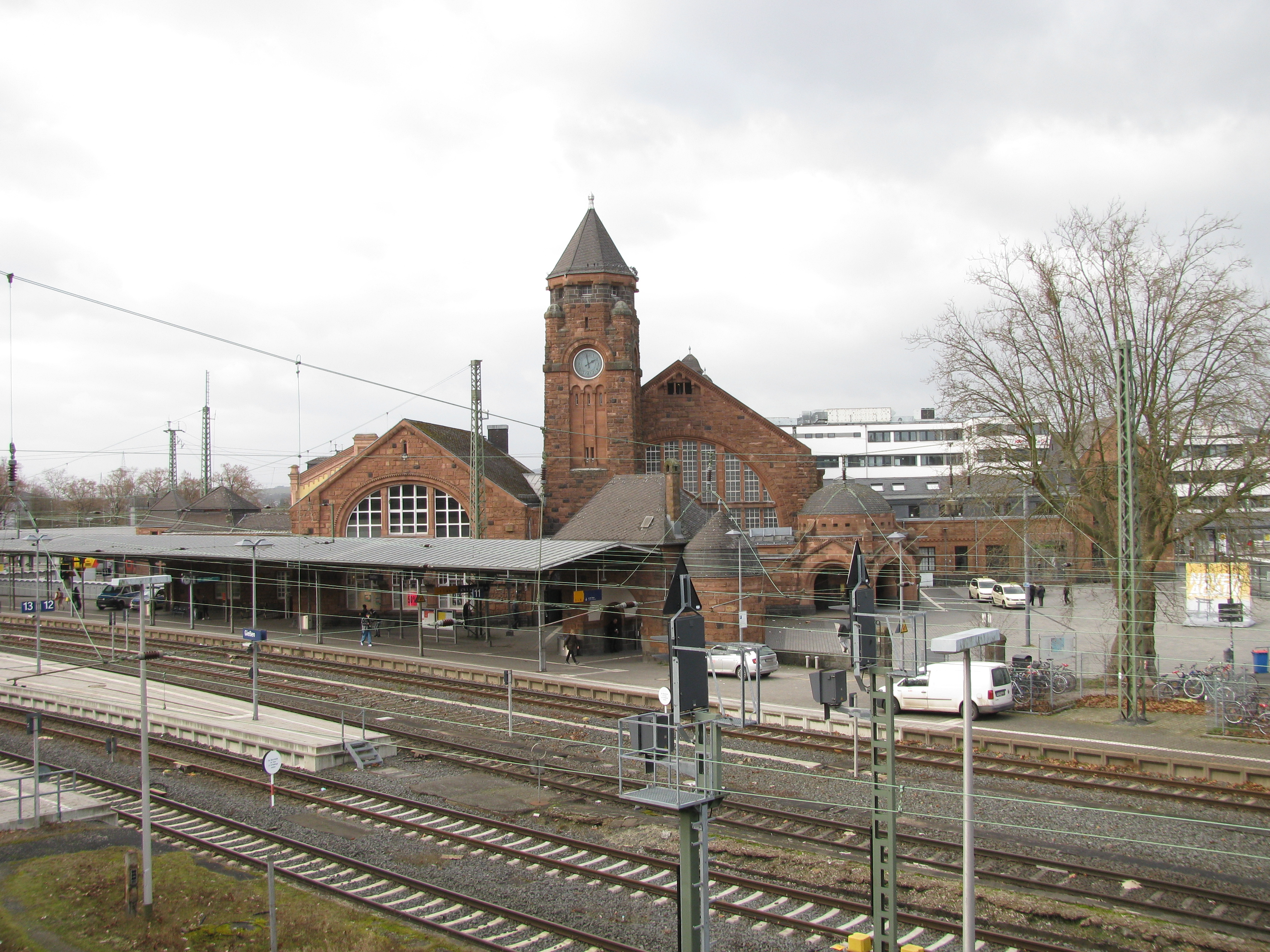

General information
- Location: Bahnhofstraße 102, 35390, Gießen, Hesse; Germany
- Coordinates: 50°34′44″N 8°39′44″E
- Owner: Deutsche Bahn
- Operator: DB Station&Service
- Lines: Main-Weser Railway (km 134.0) (KBS 620, 630); Dill Railway (km 166.0) (KBS 445, 625); Gießen–Fulda railway (km 0.0) (KBS 635); Gießen–Gelnhausen railway (km 0.0) (KBS 631)
- Platforms: 11

Construction
- Accessible: Yes
- Architect: Ludwig Hofmann
- Architectural style: Neo-romantic

Other information
- Station code: 2120
- DS100 code: FG
- IBNR: 8000124
- Category: 2
- Fare zone: : 1501
- Website: www.bahnhof.de

History
- Opened: 1853–1854; 1904–1911 (rebuilt)

Passengers
- 20,000 per day

Services
Preceding station	DB Fernverkehr	Following station
Marburg towards Westerland (Sylt)	ICE 24	Friedberg (Hess) towards Frankfurt (Main) Hbf
Marburg towards Bremen Hbf	ICE 26	Frankfurt (Main) Hbf towards Karlsruhe Hbf
Preceding station	DB Regio Mitte	Following station
Wetzlar towards Koblenz Hbf	RE 25	Terminus
Marburg towards Kassel Hbf	RE 30	Friedberg (Hess) towards Frankfurt (Main) Hbf
Terminus	RB 49	Großen-Linden towards Hanau Hbf
Preceding station	Hessische Landesbahn	Following station
Terminus	RE 24	Wetzlar towards Weilburg
Dutenhofen towards Frankfurt (Main) Hbf	RB 40	Großen-Linden towards Dillenburg
Gießen Oswaldsgarten towards Frankfurt (Main) Hbf	RB 41	Großen-Linden towards Treysa
Gießen Licher Straße towards Fulda	RB 45	Dutenhofen towards Limburg (Lahn)
Terminus	RB 46	Gießen Erdkauter Weg towards Gelnhausen
Gießen Oswaldsgarten towards Kassel Hbf	RE 98	Friedberg (Hess) towards Frankfurt (Main) Hbf
Wetzlar towards Siegen Hbf	RE 99	Friedberg (Hess) towards Frankfurt (Main) Hbf
Location

Gießen railway station (German: Bahnhof Gießen) is the main railway station in Gießen, Hesse, Germany. The station is a Category 2 station is used by 20,000 passengers daily. The station was opened on 25 August 1850 and is located on the Main-Weser Railway (Kassel – Frankfurt (Main)) and Dill railway (Siegen – Gießen). The current station reception building was built between 1904 and 1911. The main original station building is a historic landmark and has been protected. Outside the station is a bus station and a taxi rank . Parking garages are located nearby.

== History ==
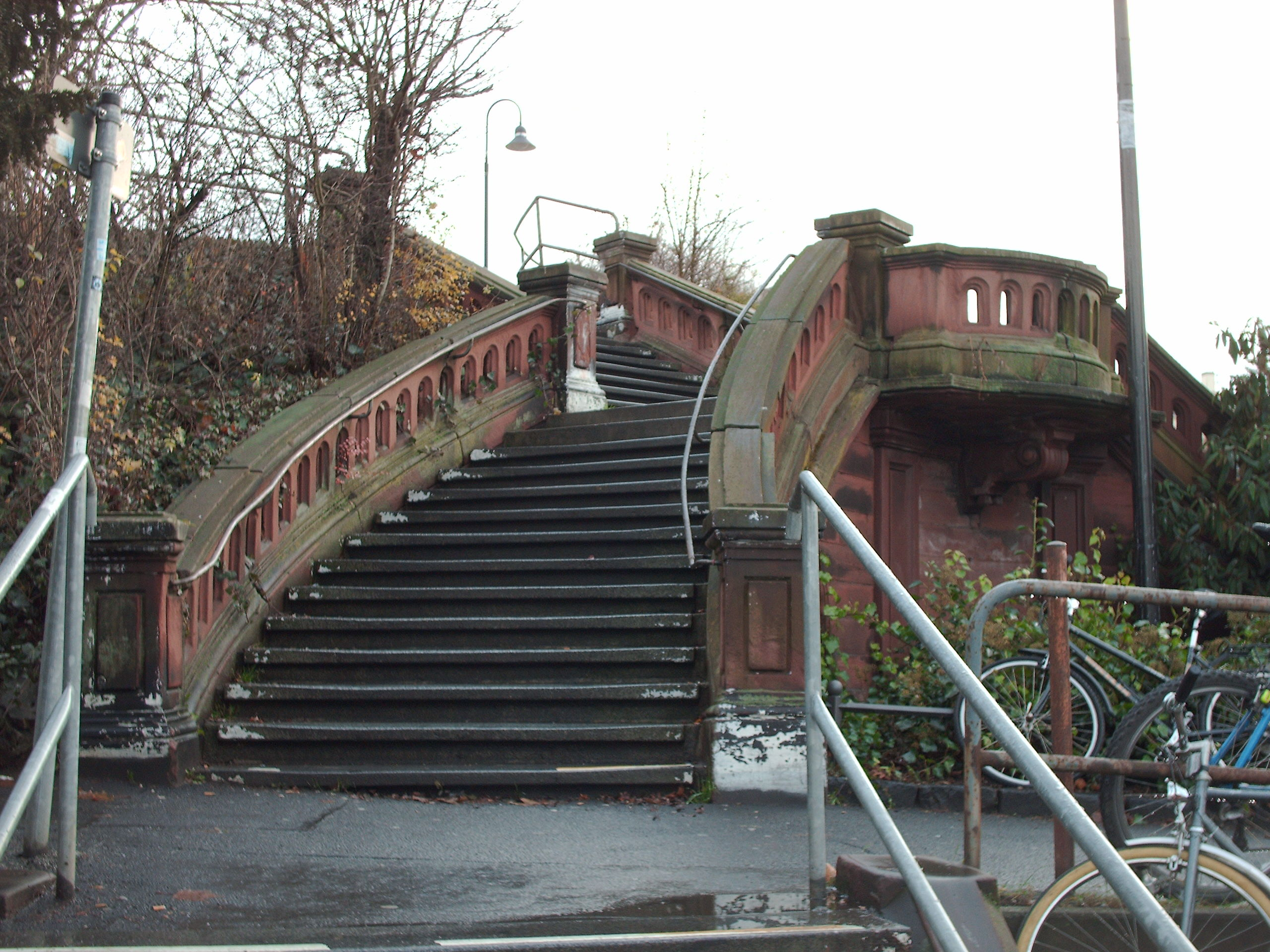
Staircase of the bridge to Alten Wetzlarer Weg

The first Gießen station was a temporary station built in 1850 on the Main-Weser Railway at Oswaldsgarten. This temporary arrangement was replaced in 1853/54 with a new station further south at the present site with an appropriate station building. This was built in a neoclassical style with a symmetrical E-shaped plan. Between 1869 and 1871, the Upper Hessian Railway Company (Oberhessische Eisenbahn-Gesellschaft) built the Vogelsberg Railway from Gießen towards Fulda and the Lahn–Kinzig Railway towards Gelnhausen. Its railway facilities in Gießen were on the other side of the station forecourt to the station building of the Main-Weser Railway. The only entrance to the station building was on Liebigstraße (then called Universitätsstraße). It was not until 1893 that a pedestrian bridge was built over the tracks leading to the Vogelsberg Railway and the Lahn–Kinzig Railway to Alten Wetzlarer Weg.

== Station building ==
The current station building was built from 1904 to 1911, reconstructing the old station building of the Main-Weser Railway in a romanesque revival style. It is built at a focal point on the visual axis of the urban extension of 1880. The cast-iron pillars supporting the platform roof were part of the station precinct of 1854. The "new" station building is a three-story building made of red sandstone with a distinctive clock tower and built on an asymmetrical floor plan. The Herborn architect, Ludwig Hoffmann was in charge of planning and executing the station. The station building is now built in the wedge between the Main-Weser Railway and the branch to the east towards the Vogelsberg Railway and the Lahn–Kinzig Railway.

During the Second World War the building was damaged and the Fürstenbahnhof (princely station) located in the northern wing was destroyed in 1944. In November 1968, the station lobby and the north wing of the station building were renovated, extending to the area of the former princely station. The facade was renovated in the early 1970s.

The station building is listed as a historic landmark under the Hessian Monument Protection Act.

At the station there is a ServicePoint, a ticket office, a station bookshop and retail outlets for food and travel needs. The station building still houses the station management including the 3-S-Zentrale office of DB Station&Service and the train announcement office, a Bahnhofsmission (a charity operating at major German stations) and the equipment of DB Services.

Between 2008 and 2010, the facilities for passenger service were rebuilt. The groundbreaking ceremony was held on 16 July 2008. The main objective of the work was the building of a new pedestrian underpass and the provision of barrier-free access to all platforms. After delays due to the long and severe winter, the new building was opened on 21 July 2010, when platform tracks 12–15 could be reached by the new underpass. Because some work was still not finished it was not officially inaugurated until the autumn of 2010.

== Layout ==
The Giessen train station has eleven station platform tracks in its two sections:

- The Main-Weser Railway station west of the station building on the line to Kassel has platform tracks 1–5. Its three platforms are served by Intercity services on the (Konstanz–) Karlsruhe–Frankfurt–Hamburg (–Stralsund) route, Regional-Express services on RMV line RE 30 on the Kassel–Giessen–Frankfurt and RE 40 Siegen–Giessen–Frankfurt (Main-Sieg-Express), which together form an hourly service to Frankfurt, and the services of the Mittelhessen-Express on the Treysa–Gießen and the Dillenburg–Wetzlar–Gießen route, which run coupled from here to Frankfurt. In addition, Regionalbahn services to and from Friedberg stop here.
- The Oberhessische Bahnhof (Upper Hesse station), the eastern part of the station has station tracks 11 to 15. These are served by services on the Vogelsberg Railway and the Lahn–Kinzig Railway as well as services running to the south-west on the Lahntal railway to Limburg and scattered services on the Dill line towards Dillenburg.
- In the tip of the wedge between the two parts of the station is track 9, which is the only bay platform of the station. It is used almost exclusively by Lahntal railway services, which start and end here.

Giessen is part of the German Intercity-Express network with ICE trains operating on the Main-Weser Railway bi-hourly between Karlsruhe, Hamburg and Sylt or the baltic coast. Southwest of the passenger station is the freight yard, which was the central marshalling yard for freight for central Hesse until December 2006. At that time local freight trains operated from here to several stations in the area (e.g. Frankenberg (Eder), Dillenburg and Nida). The majority of these freight operations have now, however, been relocated to Wetzlar freight yard.

== Rail services ==
In the 2026 timetable, the following services stop at the station:

=== Long distance ===
The station is served every four hours by services on the ICE 26 line from Karlsruhe to Bremen.

Line	Route	Interval
ICE 24	Westerland (Sylt) – Hamburg – Hannover – Kassel-Wilhelmshöhe – Gießen – Frankfurt	1 train pair
ICE 26	Bremen – Hannover – Kassel-Wilhelmshöhe – Marburg – Gießen – Frankfurt (– Heidelberg – Karlsruhe)	Every 4 hours

=== Local services ===
Line	Route	Interval
RE 24	Weilburg – Wetzlar – Gießen	120 mins
RE 25	Koblenz – Niederlahnstein – Bad Ems – Limburg – Weilburg – Wetzlar – Gießen	120 mins
RE 30	Kassel Hbf – Kassel-Wilhelmshöhe – Marburg – Gießen – Friedberg – Frankfurt	120 min (Frankf.-Giessen/ Marburg peak booster trains)
RE 98	Kassel – Treysa – Marburg – Gießen – Frankfurt	120 min (Kassel–Gießen); 60 min (Siegen–Gießen); 120 min (Gießen–Frankfurt)
RE 99	Siegen – Haiger – Dillenburg - Herborn – Wetzlar – Giessen – Friedberg – Frankfurt (Main) West	60 min (Siegen–Giessen); 120 min (Giessen–Frankfurt)
RB 40	Frankfurt – Friedberg – Bad Nauheim – Butzbach – Gießen – Wetzlar – Herborn (Dillkr) – Dillenburg	40/80 min (Frankf.–Giessen); 60 min (Giessen–Dillenburg)
RB 41	Frankfurt – Friedberg – Bad Nauheim – Butzbach – Gießen – Marburg – Stadtallendorf – Treysa	60 min; 40/80 min (Frankf.-Gießen); 30 min (Gießen-Marb. weekdays); 120 min (Marb.-Stadtallend. weekend); 120 min (Stadtallend.-Treysa)
RB 45	Limburg – Weilburg – Albshausen – Wetzlar – Gießen – Alsfeld – Fulda	60 min; 20/60 min (Gießen–Mücke and Alsfeld–Fulda on weekdays)
RB 46	Gießen – Lich – Nidda – Gelnhausen	60 mins
RB 49	Gießen – Friedberg – Nidderau – Hanau	60/120 min (weekdays); 120 min (weekend)

- RE98/RE99 are joined in Gießen running towards Frankfurt and split towards Kassel/Siegen.
- RB40/RB41 are joined in Gießen running towards Frankfurt and split towards Treysa/Dillenburg.
