= Weilburg station =

Railway station in Hesse, Germany

Weilburg
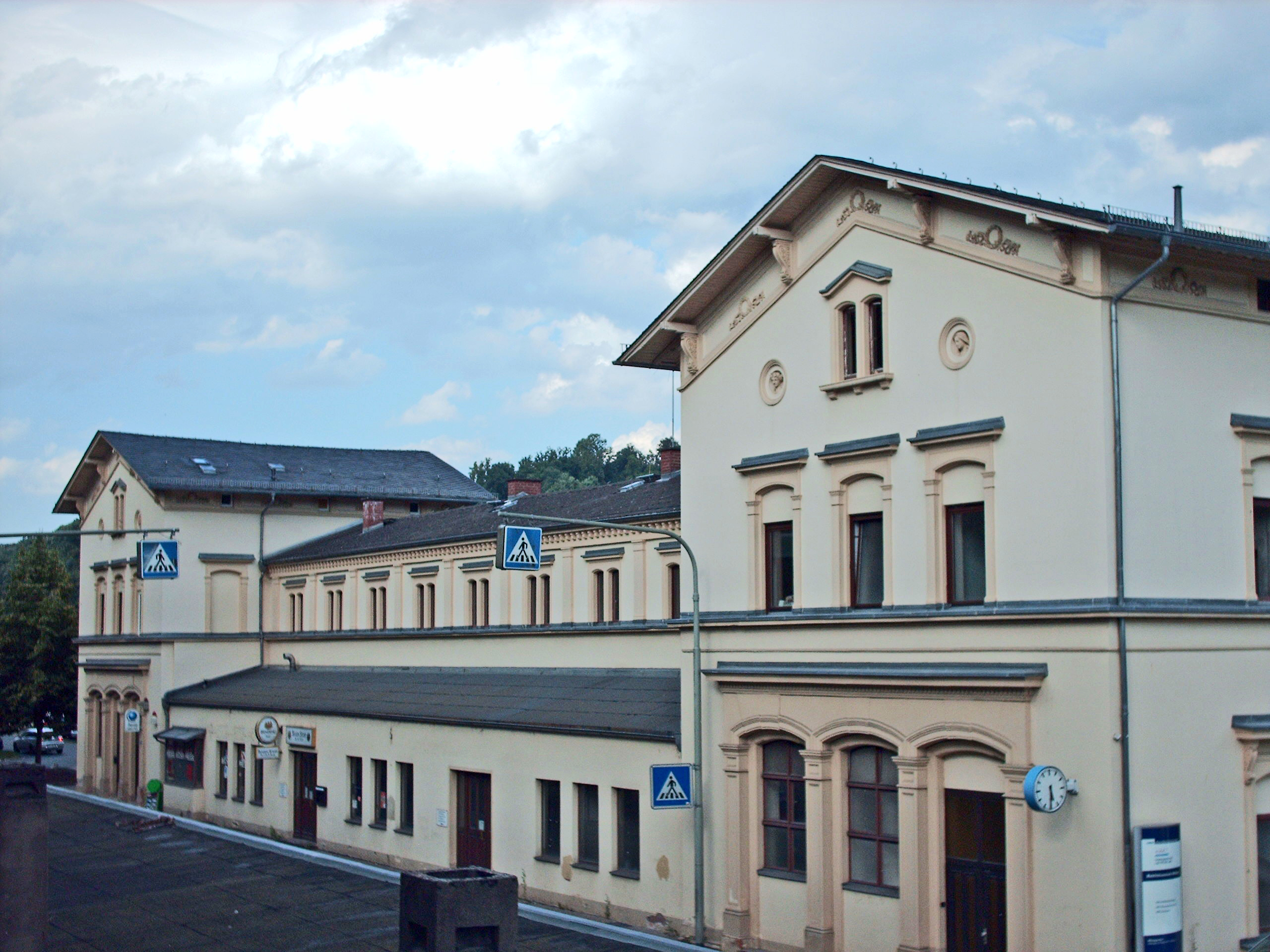
- Entrance building

General information
- Location: Bahnhofstr. 4, Weilburg, Hesse; Germany
- Coordinates: 50°29′11″N 8°16′04″E
- Lines: Lahn Valley Railway (km 23.0) (625); Weil Valley Railway (km 0.0) (closed)
- Platforms: 2

Construction
- Accessible: Yes
- Architect: Heinrich Velde

Other information
- Station code: 6612
- DS100 code: FWG
- IBNR: 8000218
- Category: 5
- Fare zone: : 5901
- Website: www.bahnhof.de

History
- Opened: 14 October 1862

Services
Preceding station	DB Regio Mitte	Following station
Limburg (Lahn) towards Koblenz Hbf	RE 25	Wetzlar towards Gießen
Preceding station	Hessische Landesbahn	Following station
Terminus	RE 24	Wetzlar towards Gießen
Gräveneck towards Limburg (Lahn)	RB 45	Löhnberg towards Fulda
Location

Weilburg is a station in the town of Weilburg in the German state of Hesse on the Lahn Valley Railway (Lahntalbahn). The Weil Valley Railway (Weiltalbahn) branched off towards Weilmünster immediately after the station from 1890 to 1988.

== History ==
Weilburg station was originally built as a terminal station of the Lahn Valley Railway during the construction of the section between the stations of Limburg (Lahn) and Weilburg, which was opened on 14 October 1862.

The Weil Valley Railway was inaugurated from Weilburg to Weilmünster on 1 November 1891. After the extension to Usingen was put into operation on 1 June 1909, trains—at one time including an express train—ran from Weilburg to Frankfurt am Main. Weilburg became a rail junction and transfer station. This role ended when passenger services ended between Weilmünster and Weilburg on 27 September 1969. Freight traffic was operated on this section until 30 January 1988 under the closure procedure. After that, Weilburg station lost its function as a hub for freight traffic.

In preparation for Hessentag ("Hesse day") 2005 in Weilburg, the island platform at Weilburg station was renewed and adapted to give access for the disabled. An additional temporary platform installed for Hessentag was then removed.

== Infrastructure ==
Entrance building

The heritage-listed entrance building was designed as a Neo-classical building by Heinrich Velde and resembles the station buildings of Leun/Braunfels and Diez, which he also designed. Between gabled, elevated terminal buildings, there is a side-gabled hall, which was rebuilt after it was destroyed in war. The cornices and the gables have ornamental motifs.

Roundhouse

As of 1890, Weilburg was the starting point of the Weil Valley Railway running up to Gravenwiesbach. Therefore, a roundhouse with a turntable was built at Weilburg station. The buildings were demolished in the 1980s. The former freight yard has also been largely dismantled, leaving four tracks.

Railway tunnel

Just behind Weilburg station is the 302 m-long Weilburg railway tunnel. This forms part of the so-called Weilburger Tunnelensemble (Weilburg tunnel ensemble) with a road tunnel and a canal tunnel.

== Connections ==
The fares of services at the station are set by the Rhein-Main-Verkehrsverbund (RMV).

=== Trains ===
Deutsche Bahn operates Regionalbahn services on the Lahn Valley Railway between Limburg and Gießen, some continuing to Alsfeld and Fulda. These services were operated by Deutsche Bahn until December 2011. Since the timetable change of 2011/2012 on 11 December 2011, the RB services on this section of the Lahn Valley Railway have been operated by Hessische Landesbahn. Alstom Coradia LINT 41 (class 648) sets are used. The Regional-Express (RE 25) services are operated with LINT 27 and 41 (class 640 and 648) railcars and Bombardier Talent (class 643) sets. Some HLB regional services terminate at Weilburg on working days.

The following services stop at Weilburg station:

Line	Route	Interval
RE 24	Gießen – Wetzlar – Weilburg	Every 2 hours
RE 25	Koblenz Hbf – Bad Ems – Diez – Limburg (Lahn) – Weilburg – Wetzlar – Gießen	Every 2 hours
RB 45	Limburg (Lahn) – Eschhofen – Weilburg – Wetzlar – Gießen (– Grünberg (Oberhess) – Mücke (Hess) – Alsfeld (Oberhess) – Fulda)	Hourly

=== Buses ===
There is a bus station on the station forecourt with several bus platforms. Here regional and town buses run into the surrounding towns, villages and communities in the Lahn valley and the high Taunus.
