= Fulda station =

Railway station in Fulda, Germany

Fulda
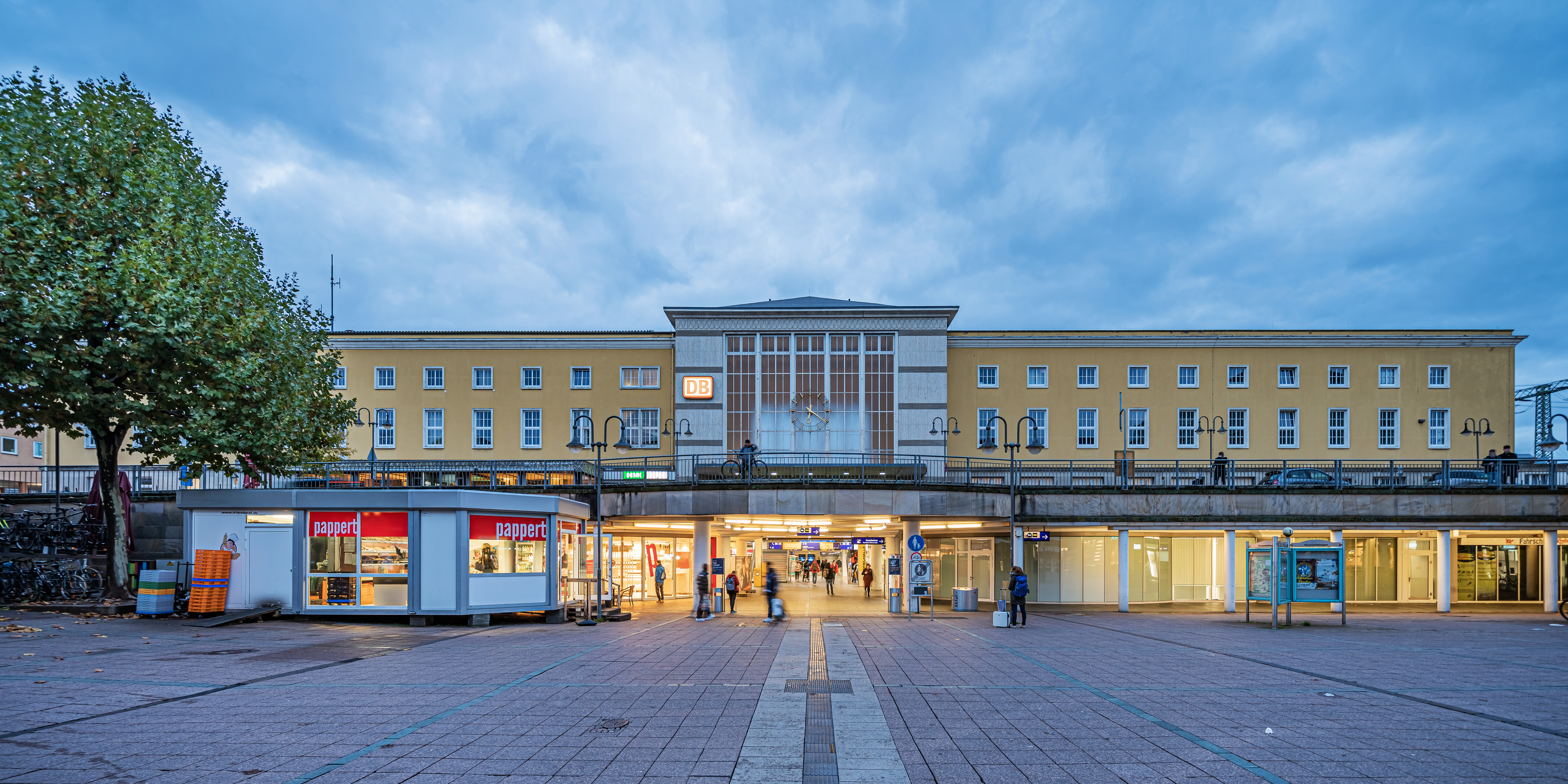

General information
- Location: Am Bahnhof 3, Fulda, Hesse; Germany
- Coordinates: 50°33′14″N 9°41′5″E
- Owner: DB Netz
- Operator: DB Station&Service
- Lines: Frankfurt–Göttingen railway; Hanover–Würzburg high-speed railway; Fulda–Gießen line
- Platforms: 10

Construction
- Accessible: Yes

Other information
- Station code: 1973
- DS100 code: FFU
- IBNR: 8000115
- Category: 2
- Fare zone: : 2001
- Website: www.bahnhof.de

History
- Opened: 1866

Services
| Preceding station | DB Fernverkehr | Following station |
|---|---|---|
| Eisenach Hbf towards Berlin Gesundbrunnen | ICE 11 | Frankfurt (Main) Hbf towards München Hbf |
| Kassel-Wilhelmshöhe towards Berlin Ostbahnhof | ICE 12 | Hanau Hbf towards Brig, Chur or Interlaken Ost |
| Kassel-Wilhelmshöhe towards Berlin Ostbahnhof | ICE 13 | Hanau Hbf towards Frankfurt (Main) Hbf, Frankfurt Airport, Karlsruhe Hbf or Stuttgart Hbf |
| Kassel-Wilhelmshöhe towards Hamburg-Altona | ICE 24 | Würzburg Hbf towards Innsbruck Hbf or Schwarzach-St.Veit |
| Kassel-Wilhelmshöhe towards Hamburg-Altona | ICE 25 | Würzburg Hbf towards München Hbf |
| Frankfurt (Main) Hbf towards Wiesbaden Hbf | ICE 50 | Bad Hersfeld towards Dresden Hbf |
| Preceding station | | Following station |
| Frankfurt (Main) Süd towards Stuttgart Hbf | FLX 10 | Eisenach towards Berlin Hbf |
| Preceding station | DB Regio Mitte | Following station |
| Neuhof (Kr Fulda) towards Frankfurt (Main) Hbf | RE 50 | Terminus |
| Preceding station | Cantus | Following station |
| Hünfeld towards Kassel Hbf | RB 5 | Terminus |
| Preceding station | Hessische Landesbahn | Following station |
| Oberbimbach towards Limburg (Lahn) | RB 45 | Terminus |
| Terminus | RB 52 | Eichenzell towards Gersfeld (Rhön) |
Location

Fulda station (IATA: ZEE) is an important transport hub of the German railway network in the east Hessian city of Fulda. It is used by about 20,000 travellers each day. It is classified by Deutsche Bahn as a category 2 station. It is a stop for Intercity-Express, Intercity services and regional services. The original station was opened as part of the Frankfurt–Bebra railway in 1866. This was destroyed during the Second World War and rebuilt after the war. The station was adapted in the 1980s for the Hanover–Würzburg high-speed railway.

== Connecting lines ==
Fulda is situated on the North-South line (Nord-Süd-Strecke) and the Hanover–Würzburg high-speed line and is an important interchange point between local and long distance traffic. The term 'North-South line' refers to the Frankfurt–Göttingen railway and the Fulda-Main Railway south of Fulda. The Vogelsberg Railway connects to the hills of the Vogelsberg in the west, and the Fulda–Gersfeld Railway (Rhön Railway) to Gersfeld in the Rhön Mountains in the east.

=== New line ===
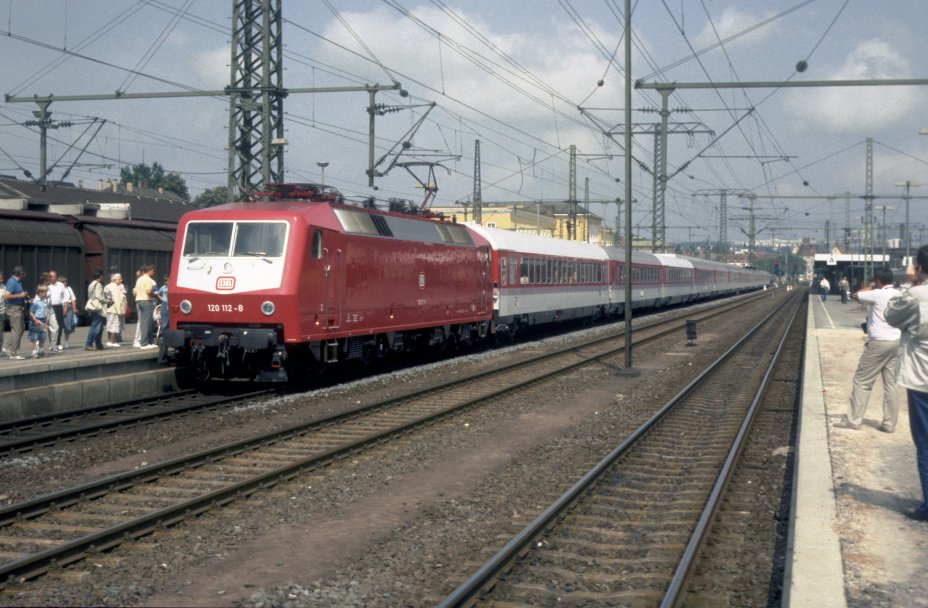
A special train at the opening of the high-speed line at the end of May 1988

The planning of the Hanover–Würzburg high-speed line originally envisaged a western bypass of Fulda, with the city connected with the new line through links to the existing line at Maberzell and Kerzell. This route, called Option I, was discarded in the mid-1970s. In the continuation of the regional planning process for the Körle–Bavarian/Hessian border section, which had started in February 1974, two other variants were introduced into the discussion in June 1976. Under Option II, the new line would also have bypassed Fulda to the west with a link between the new line and the station at Neuhof. Under Option III (which was later substantially realised), it was proposed that the new line would be built along the existing line between Niesig and Bronzell. In 1976, DB adopted Option III and it was approved by the regional planning process in Fulda, which was completed in July 1978.

Under the operating concept adopted, the tracks of the new line and the North-South line run parallel in the same direction on either side of the station platforms, allowing easy transfers between the two lines. The tracks of the new line were built in the middle of the tracks through the existing through station; on either side are the tracks of the north-south line. All existing tracks had to be rebuilt for this work, including the bridges of intersecting roads and water systems. Overall, between 1984 and 1991 (according to a planning document from about 1988), there would be 89 construction stages with 28 intermediate track layouts, during which the operation of passenger and freight through the station was to be fully maintained. In 1985 a new central signal box went into operation. The relocated tracks on the north-south line towards Frankfurt went into operation in December 1986; the tracks towards Göttingen followed in October 1987. At the end of 1987, railway construction began on the new line to Kassel.

== Station building ==
At the opening of the Frankfurt–Bebra railway to Fulda, the city received a station building that was of an appropriate size for those times, but architecturally conventional, in the Rundbogen style. It had a two-storey central section, attached to two single-storey wings, which were, in turn, each attached to a two-storey corner pavilion. This building was destroyed in the Second World War in 1944.

A massive new building was built on the foundations of the former station building between 1946 and 1954 to a design by architects Schiebler & Helbich. This is dominated by a central, glass-enclosed lobby.

During the construction of the Hanover–Würzburg high-speed line in the 1980s, Fulda station was redesigned. Bahnhofstraße, the street on the southwest side of the station, was lowered to the station's basement level and a new entrance area was created, so that the pedestrian tunnel running under the tracks now emerges at ground level. Due to this lowering of the station forecourt, the entrance building now appears higher and more monumental than it did originally. A central bus station was built southwest of the station building on the same level as the platforms.

== Station facilities ==
The passenger station has ten continuous through tracks, seven of which are used for passenger services; another two are used as through tracks for non-stopping trains. Track 10 is used as a siding for a rescue train for the high-speed line that is stationed in Fulda. There are also three terminal tracks, which are only accessible from the north and mainly serve Regionalbahn services on the Vogelsberg line and on the line to Gießen.

South of the passenger railway station there is a freight yard, which was formerly important for express freight. Today it handles very little freight. Until the late 1990s, containers were transhipped there.

Two platform tracks have been installed for the new line between the tracks used by the north-south line. Between the new line tracks there is a passing track for traffic not stopping at the station. While platform 1 is reserved for regional transport, the two island platforms to the west each have one face on the new line and one on the old line, with the tracks facing each platform running in the same direction to facilitate the transfer of passengers between trains.

Close to the station to the southwest and northeast are tight curves with radii of 600 and 675 m. This limits speed to 100 km/h, even for trains that are not stopping. Due to spatial constraints, that speed could not be raised as part of the building of the new line.

== DB Netz Notfalltechnik ==
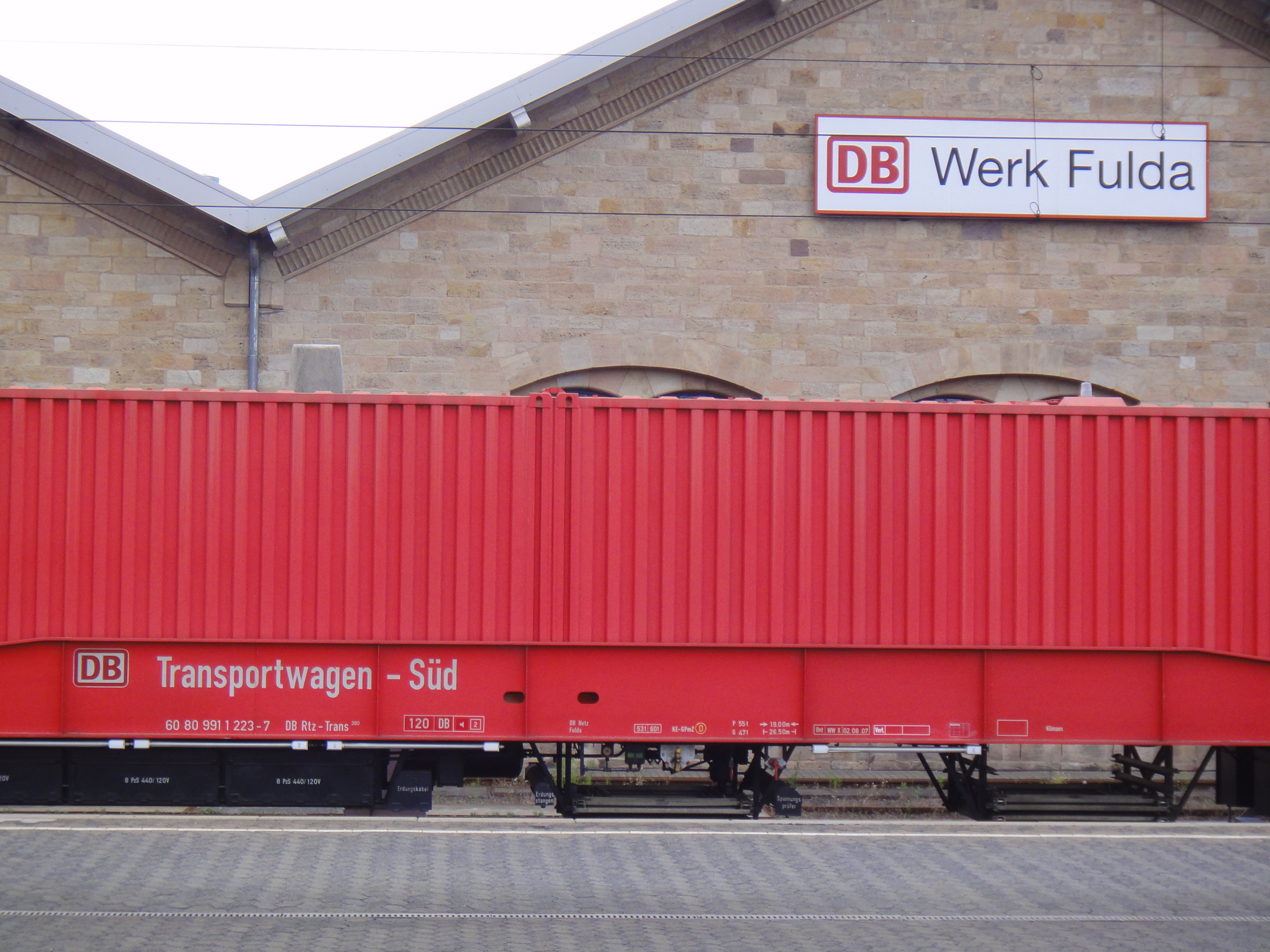
DB Netz Notfalltechnik train at Fulda station.

Fulda station is, in addition to Leipzig Hauptbahnhof and Wanne-Eickel Hauptbahnhof, one of the three locations of DB Netz Notfalltechnik in Germany.

== Rail services ==
=== Long-distance traffic ===
Due to its location on the north-south line, numerous fast trains ran through the station (often stopping) for many decades, including well-known services of the postwar period, such as the Blaue Enzian, which ran between Hamburg and Munich. In 1977, there were about 320 trains each day.

Most long distance trains that use the Hanover–Würzburg high-speed line stop at Fulda station. Only the Intercity-Express trains of lines 20 and 22 (Hamburg–Frankfurt–Stuttgart/Basel) and the ICE-Sprinter line between Berlin and Frankfurt (a premium service with one service running each way non-stop in the early morning and the evening of each working day and Sunday evening) run through the station without stopping. In the 2026 timetable, the following services stop at the station:

| Line | Route | | | Frequency |
|---|---|---|---|---|
| ICE 11 | Berlin Gesundbrunnen – Berlin – Leipzig – Erfurt – Fulda – Frankfurt – Mannheim – Stuttgart – Ulm – Augsburg – Munich | | | Every 2 hours |
| ICE 12 | Berlin Ostbahnhof – Berlin – Wolfsburg – Braunschweig – Kassel – Fulda – Frankfurt – Mannheim – Karlsruhe – Freiburg – Basel – Switzerland | | | Every 2 hours |
| ICE 13 | Berlin Ostbahnhof – Berlin – Wolfsburg – Braunschweig – Kassel – Fulda – Frankfurt South – | Darmstadt – Heidelberg – | Karlsruhe | Every 2 hours |
| ICE 13 | Berlin Ostbahnhof – Berlin – Wolfsburg – Braunschweig – Kassel – Fulda – Frankfurt South – | Darmstadt – Heidelberg – | Stuttgart | Every 2 hours |
| ICE 13 | Berlin Ostbahnhof – Berlin – Wolfsburg – Braunschweig – Kassel – Fulda – Frankfurt South – | Frankfurt Airport | | Every 2 hours |
| ICE 24 | Hamburg-Altona – Hamburg – Hannover – Kassel – Fulda – | | Schwarzach-St. Veit | One train pair |
| ICE 24 | Hamburg-Altona – Hamburg – Hannover – Kassel – Fulda – | | Innsbruck | One train pair |
| ICE 25 | Hamburg-Altona – Hamburg – Hannover – Göttingen – Kassel Wilhelmshöhe – Fulda – Würzburg – Nuremberg – Ingolstadt – Munich (– Garmisch-Partenkirchen) | | | Hourly |
| ICE 50 | Dresden – Leipzig – Erfurt – Fulda – Frankfurt – Frankfurt Airport – Wiesbaden | | | Every 2 hours |
| FLX 10 | Stuttgart – Heidelberg – Frankfurt Süd – Fulda – Erfurt – Halle – Berlin | | | 2 train pairs daily |

=== Local services ===
| Line | Route | Interval |
|---|---|---|
| RE 5 | Frankfurt – Frankfurt Süd – Hanau – Fulda – Bebra | Some trains |
| RB 5 | Kassel Hbf – Kassel-Wilhelmshöhe – Bebra – Bad Hersfeld – Fulda | 60 min |
| RB 45 | Limburg – Weilburg – Albshausen – Wetzlar – Gießen – Alsfeld – Fulda | 60 min; 20/60 min (Gießen–Mücke and Alsfeld–Fulda on weekdays) |
| RE 50 | Frankfurt – Frankfurt Süd – Offenbach – Hanau – Gelnhausen – Fulda (– Bebra) | 60 min |
| RB 52 | Fulda – Eichenzell – Lütter – Gersfeld | 60 min |

== See also ==
- Rail transport in Germany
