= Limburg (Lahn) station =

Railway station in Hesse, Germany

Limburg (Lahn)
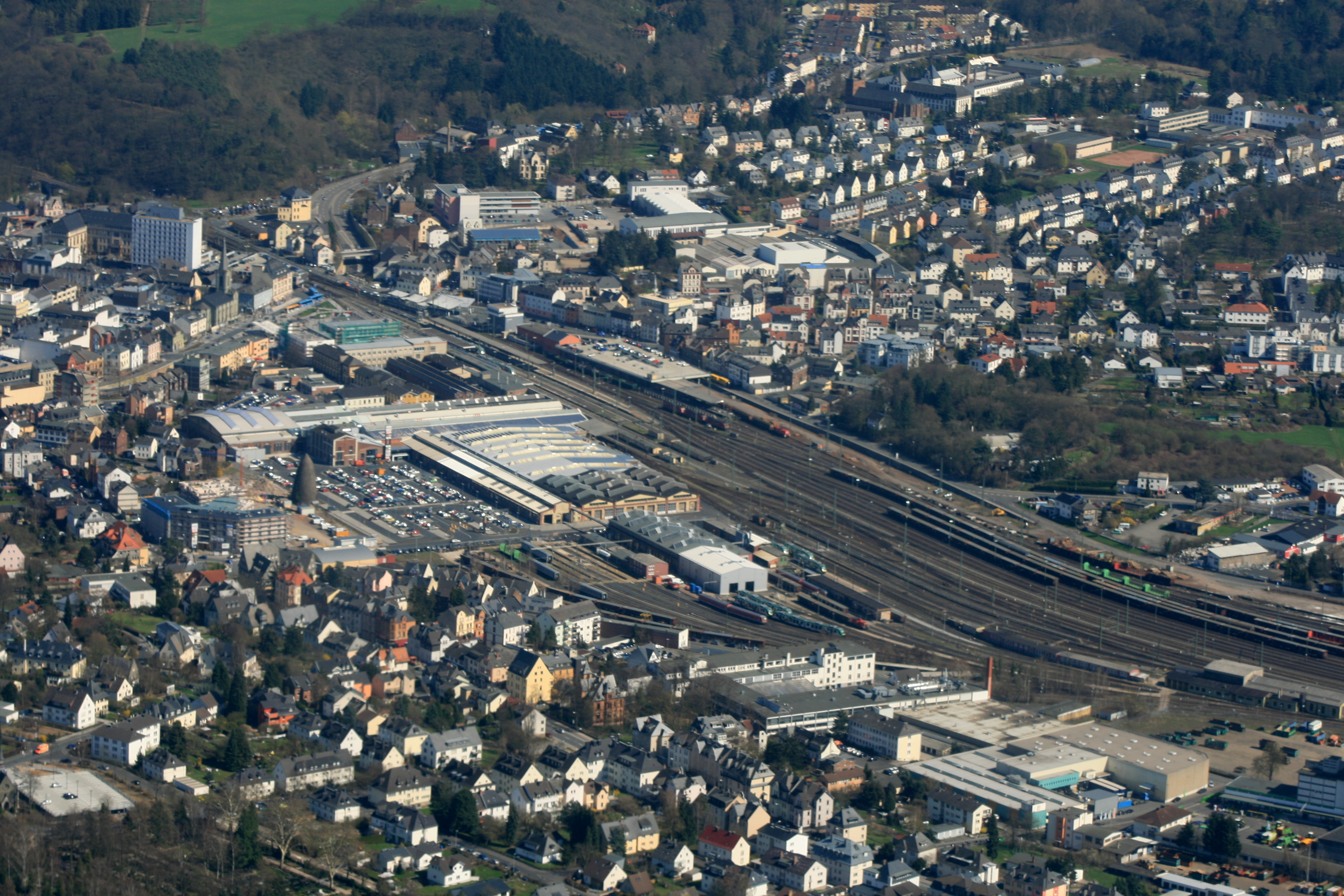
- Aerial view of the station from the west

General information
- Location: Bahnhofsplatz 1, Limburg an der Lahn, Hesse; Germany
- Coordinates: 50°23′03″N 8°03′44″E
- Owner: DB Netz
- Operator: DB Station&Service
- Lines: Lahntal railway (KBS 625); Lower Westerwald Railway (KBS 629); Upper Westerwald Railway (KBS 461); Main-Lahn Railway (KBS 627)
- Platforms: 6

Construction
- Accessible: Yes

Other information
- Station code: 3720
- DS100 code: FL
- IBNR: 8000229
- Category: 3
- Fare zone: : 6001; VRM: 177 (RMV transitional tariff)
- Website: www.bahnhof.de

History
- Opened: 5 July 1862; 164 years ago

Services
Preceding station	DB Regio Mitte	Following station
Terminus	RE 20	Eschhofen towards Frankfurt (Main) Hbf
Terminus	RB 22	Eschhofen towards Frankfurt (Main) Hbf
Diez towards Mayen Ost	RB 23	Terminus
Diez towards Koblenz Hbf	RE 25	Weilburg towards Gießen
Preceding station	Hessische Landesbahn	Following station
Terminus	RB 21	Eschhofen towards Wiesbaden Hbf
Diez-Ost towards Siershahn	RB 29	Terminus
Terminus	RB 45	Eschhofen towards Fulda
Diez-Ost towards Siegen Hbf	RB 90	Terminus
Location
- Location within Hesse

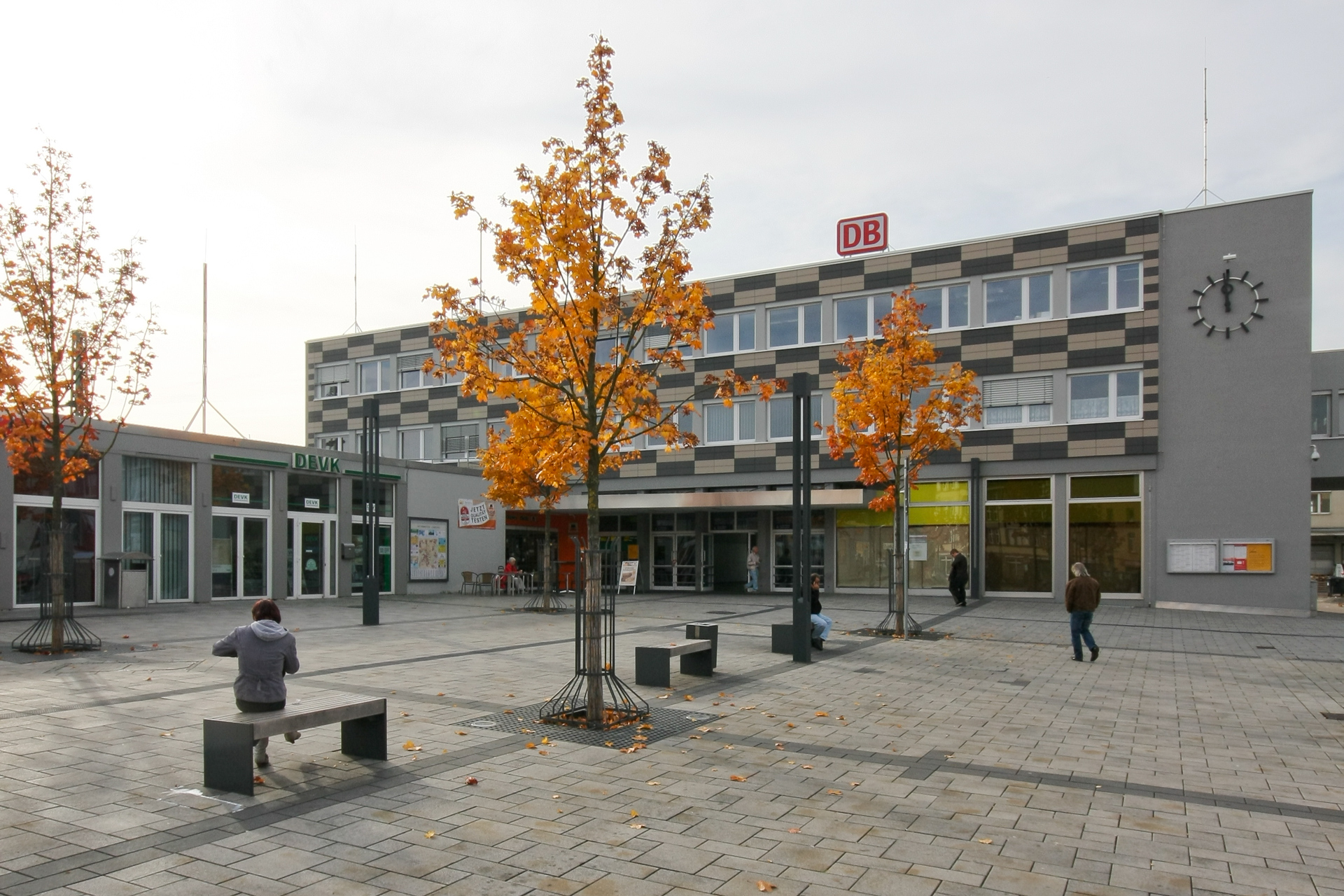
Station building

Limburg (Lahn) station is a station in the city of Limburg an der Lahn in the German state of Hesse. It is on the Lahntal railway (German: Lahntalbahn), running between Koblenz and Gießen.

== Infrastructure ==
The only section of line that is electrified in the Limburg area is between Limburg freight yard and Eschhofen station. At the west end of Limburg station a two-track branch line branches off towards Staffel, where it separates into two single-track lines to Siershahn (the Lower Westerwald Railway, Westerwaldbahn) and to Au (Sieg) (the Upper Westerwald Railway, Oberwesterwaldbahn). East of Limburg, in Eschhofen, the double track, electrified Main-Lahn Railway (Main-Lahn-Bahn) branches off to the southeast towards Frankfurt and Wiesbaden (via the Ländches Railway (Ländchesbahn).

Until 2005, there was also a Deutsche Bahn maintenance depot at the station, which is now closed and was formerly partly leased to the private rail operator, vectus Verkehrsgesellschaft mbH, which has been taken over by Hessische Landesbahn. Most of the former site was converted into a shopping centre. Vectus Verkehrsgesellschaft mbH also had its headquarters there until 2014. The registered office of Hessische Landesbahn is now in an adjoining building of WERKStadt Limburg. A two-track hall is used for the maintenance and maintenance of traction units. The electrified sidings are used by Deutsche Bahn. All non-electrified sidings are used by both DB and HLB. A former freight line and some points were dismantled to create more space for parking spaces used by employees of the surrounding companies. A Bike and ride facility is located on platform 1, a park and ride lot for cars in the south of the station and one for motorbikes close to the fountain, north side of the station.

== Train services ==
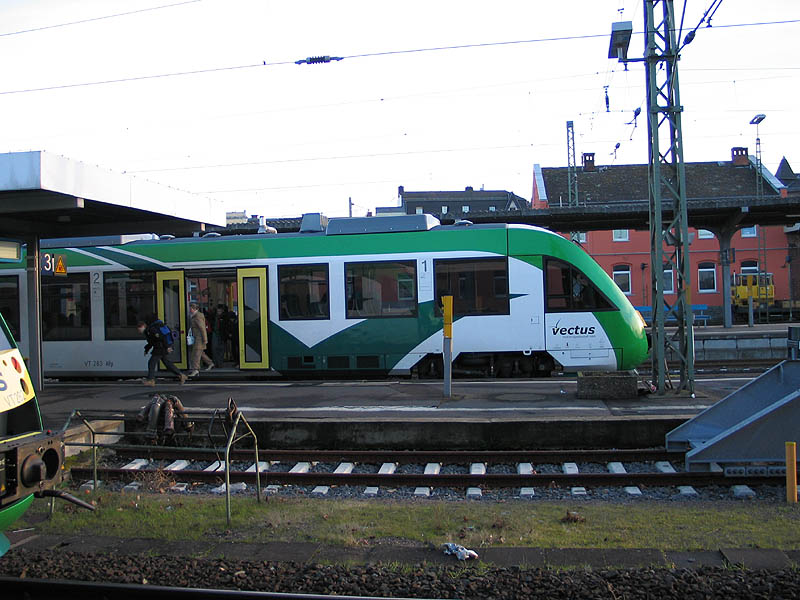
LINT 41 of vectus Verkehrsgesellschaft in Limburg station

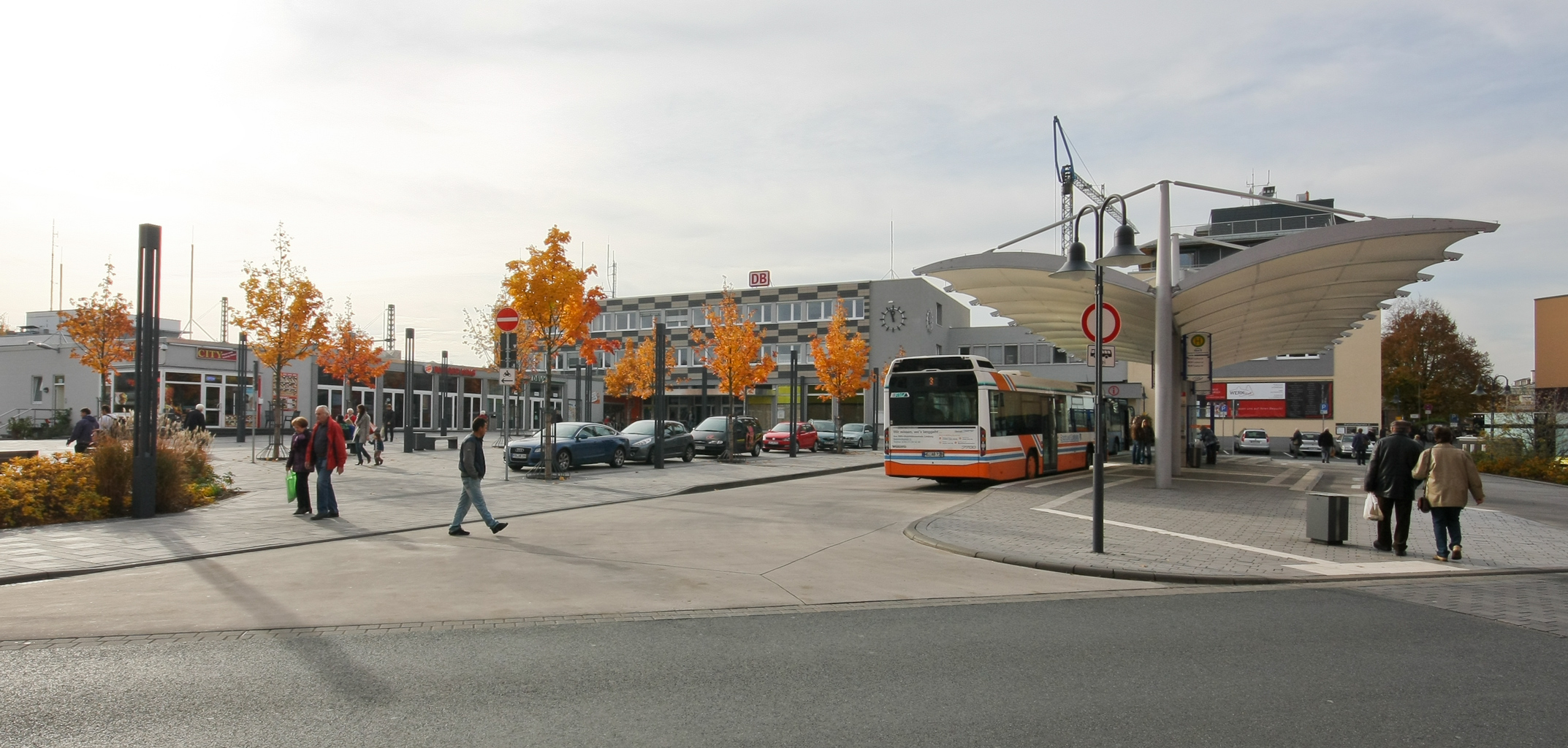
Station forecourt

The following services currently call at Limburg:

Line	Route	Comments
RE 20 Main-Lahn Railway	Frankfurt (Main) Hbf – Frankfurt-Höchst – Niedernhausen (Taunus) – Limburg (Lahn)	Mon-Fri peaks only, hourly
RB 21 Main-Lahn Railway, Ländches Railway	Wiesbaden Hbf – Niedernhausen (Taunus) – Limburg (Lahn)	Some trains
RB 22 Main-Lahn Railway	Frankfurt (Main) Hbf – Frankfurt-Höchst – Niedernhausen (Taunus) – Limburg (Lahn)	30 or 60 mins (extra trains in peak)
RB 23 Lahn-Eifel-Bahn	(Kaisersesch → Urmersbach → Monreal → Mayen West →) (some trains) Mayen Ost – Andernach – Koblenz Stadtmitte – Koblenz Hbf – Bad Ems – Nassau (Lahn) – Diez – Limburg (Lahn)	Hourly (extra trains in peak)
RE 25 Lahn-Eifel-Bahn	Koblenz Hbf – Bad Ems – Nassau (Lahn) – Diez – Limburg (Lahn) – Weilburg – Wetzlar – Gießen	Every 2 hours
RB 29 Lower Westerwald Railway	Limburg (Lahn) – Diez Ost – Staffel – Montabaur – Siershahn	Hourly
RB 45 Lahntalbahn	Limburg (Lahn) – Eschhofen – Weilburg – Wetzlar – Gießen – Alsfeld – Fulda	Hourly
RB 90 Westerwald-Sieg-Bahn	Limburg (Lahn) – Diez Ost – Staffel – Hadamar – Westerburg – Nistertal-Bad Marienberg – Hachenburg – Altenkirchen (Westerw) – Au (Sieg) – Betzdorf (Sieg) – Siegen Hbf (– Kreuztal)	54/66 min (weekdays); 120 min (weekends/holidays)

== Connections to other means of transport ==
At the main entry of Limburg Lahn station a stop of the city busses of Stadtlinie Limburg is located (ZOB West stop), another city bus station at Hospitalstr., next to the train station as well as city and local bus stops at the basement of the carpark Parkhaus Bahnhof and Holzheimer Str., Bahnhof Südseite stops stop.

The local bus line 570 runs primarily beside the Aar Valley Railway, on which service has been discontinued.

During the construction of the Cologne–Frankfurt high-speed railway, it was decided not to establish a rail link between Limburg (Lahn) station and Limburg Süd station. Buses that stop at the bus station on the south side of the station connect the two stations together and are free for travelers with train tickets to either station, this are the busses of the line number 580 (St. Goarshausen - Diez - Limburg Süd Station).

A bike-and-ride (B+R) faciality for bicycles and a park-and-ride (P+R) lot for cars and motorbikes are located at Limburg station.

Additionally, a cab rank is located next to the main entry.
