= Lauterbach (Hess) Nord station =

Railway station in Lauterbach, Germany

Lauterbach (Hess) Nord
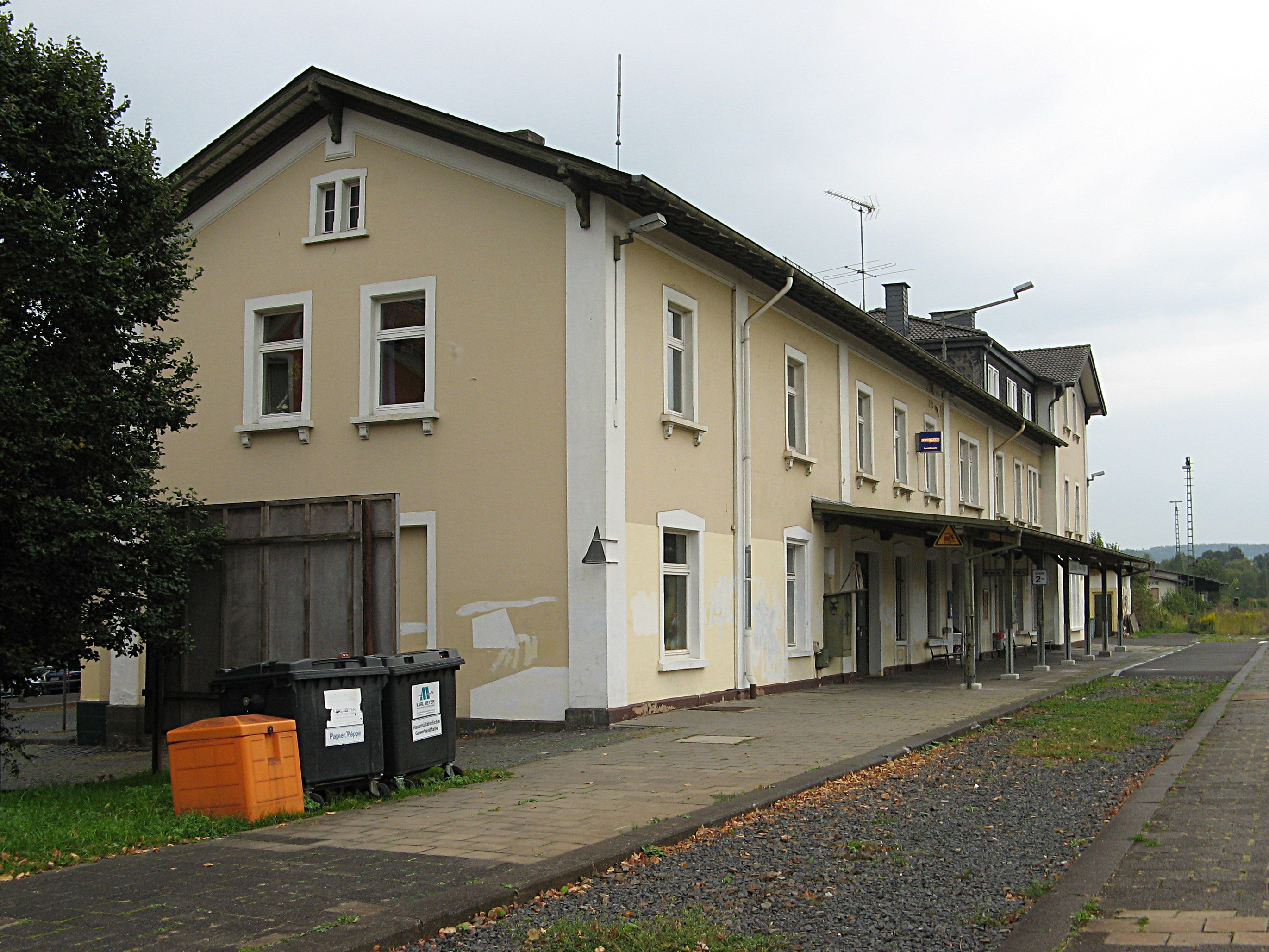
- The station seen from the railway side

General information
- Location: Bahnhofstr. 102, Lauterbach, Hesse; Germany
- Coordinates: 50°38′37″N 9°24′28″E
- Lines: Vogelsberg Railway (km 79.1); Oberwald Railway (km 96.0) (closed)
- Platforms: 2

Construction
- Accessible: Yes

Other information
- Station code: 3602
- DS100 code: FLAU
- IBNR: 8000222
- Category: 6
- Fare zone: : 1024
- Website: www.bahnhof.de

History
- Opened: 22 November 1870

Services
Preceding station	Hessische Landesbahn	Following station
Alsfeld towards Limburg (Lahn)	RB 45	Angersbach towards Fulda
Location

Lauterbach (Hess) Nord station is a through station on the Vogelsberg Railway (Vogelsbergbahn) from Gießen to Fulda in the German state of Hesse. Until the closure of the Oberwald Railway (Oberwaldbahn) to Glauburg-Stockheim it was a rail junction.

== History ==
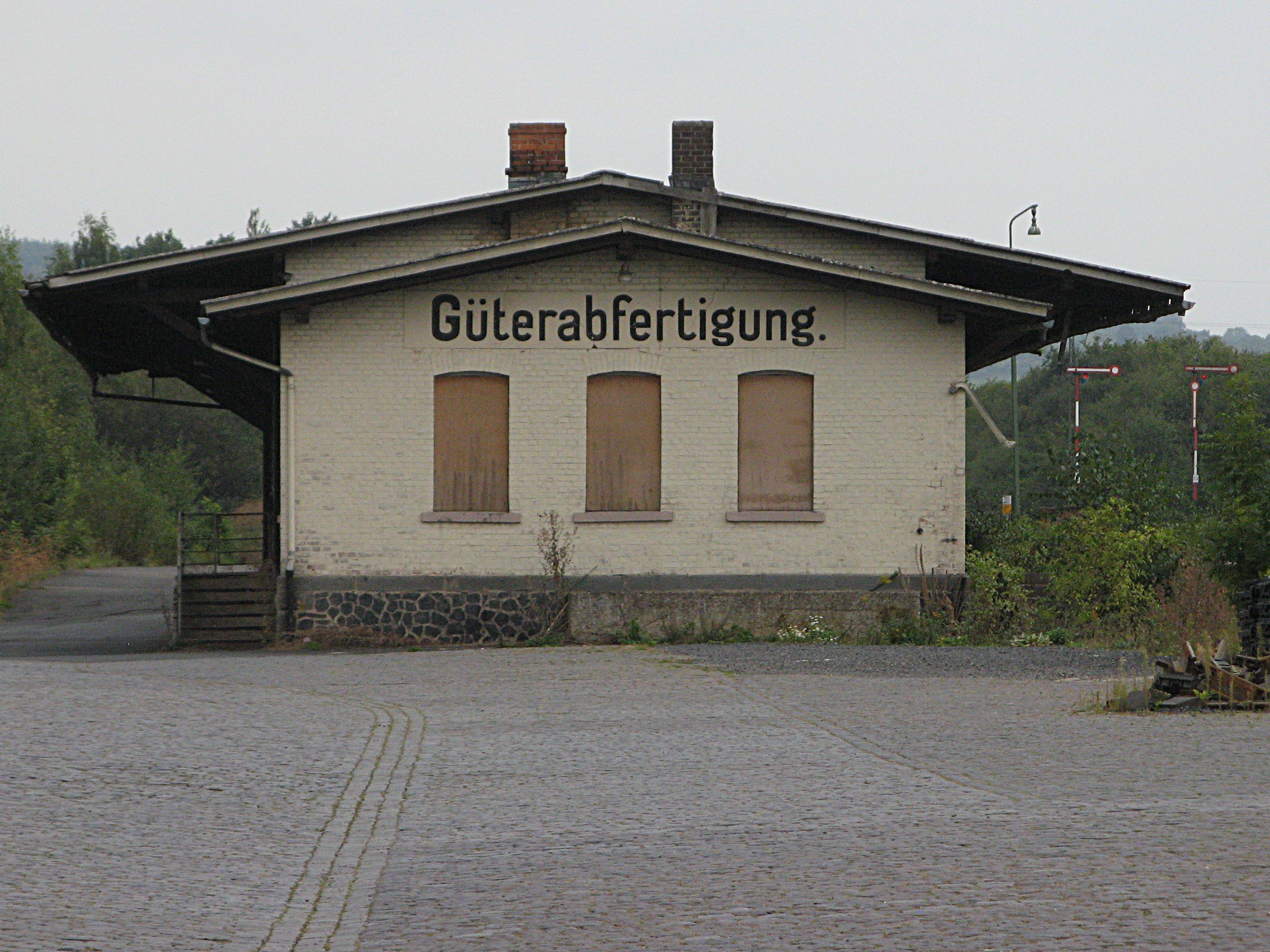
Freight shed

The station was built during the construction of the Alsfeld–Lauterbach section of the Vogelsberg Railway and opened on 22 November 1870. On 31 December of the same year, the line was extended to Bad Salzschlirf. The station was extended around 1905, when the Bad Vilbel–Glauburg-Stockheim railway (also called the Niddertalbahn—Nidder Valley Railway) was opened, providing an extension of the Oberwald Railway to give a direct connection to Frankfurt am Main.

The buildings of the station are listed as a cultural monument under the Hessian Monument Protection Act (Hessischer Denkmalschutzgesetz). The pedestrian over bridge north-west of the railway, a rivet iron structure, was also under monument protection. It was extended during the extension of the track layout around 1905 and was mainly used for pedestrians from Maar. On 28 November 2008, it was demolished by Deutsche Bahn without consulting the State Office for the Preservation of Monuments (Landesamt für Denkmalpflege) and the town of Lauterbach.

In September 2009, Deutsche Bahn chairman Rüdiger Grube announced that it would spend a total of €24.6 million from the economic stimulus program II to upgrade the Vogelsberg Railway by 2011. The modernisation work lasted from mid-June 2010 to the summer of 2011.

Since the timetable change 2011/2012 on 11 December 2011, passenger services have been operated by the Hessische Landesbahn GmbH (HLB) with LINT 41 diesel multiple units.

The station building is the headquarters of the Pro Bahn & Bus e. V. association. The building was sold to a private investor on 1 January 2014.

== Connections ==
The station is served daily by hourly Regionalbahn services on the Limburg (Lahn)–Weilburg–Wetzlar–Gießen–Alsfeld–Fulda route.

Since the 2016/2017 timetable change on 11 December 2016, services on the Vogelsberg Railway (formerly RB 35) and the subsequent Lahn Valley Railway (formerly RB 25) have run as RB 45.

Line	Route	Interval
RB 45	Lahn Valley Railway / Vogelsberg Railway; Limburg (Lahn) – Eschhofen – Weilburg – Wetzlar – Gießen – Grünberg (Oberhess) – Mücke (Hess) – Alsfeld (Oberhess) – Lauterbach (Hess) Nord – Fulda	Hourly (+ additional services in the peak)
