= Bad Salzschlirf station =

Railway station in Bad Salzschlirf, Germany

Bad Salzschlirf
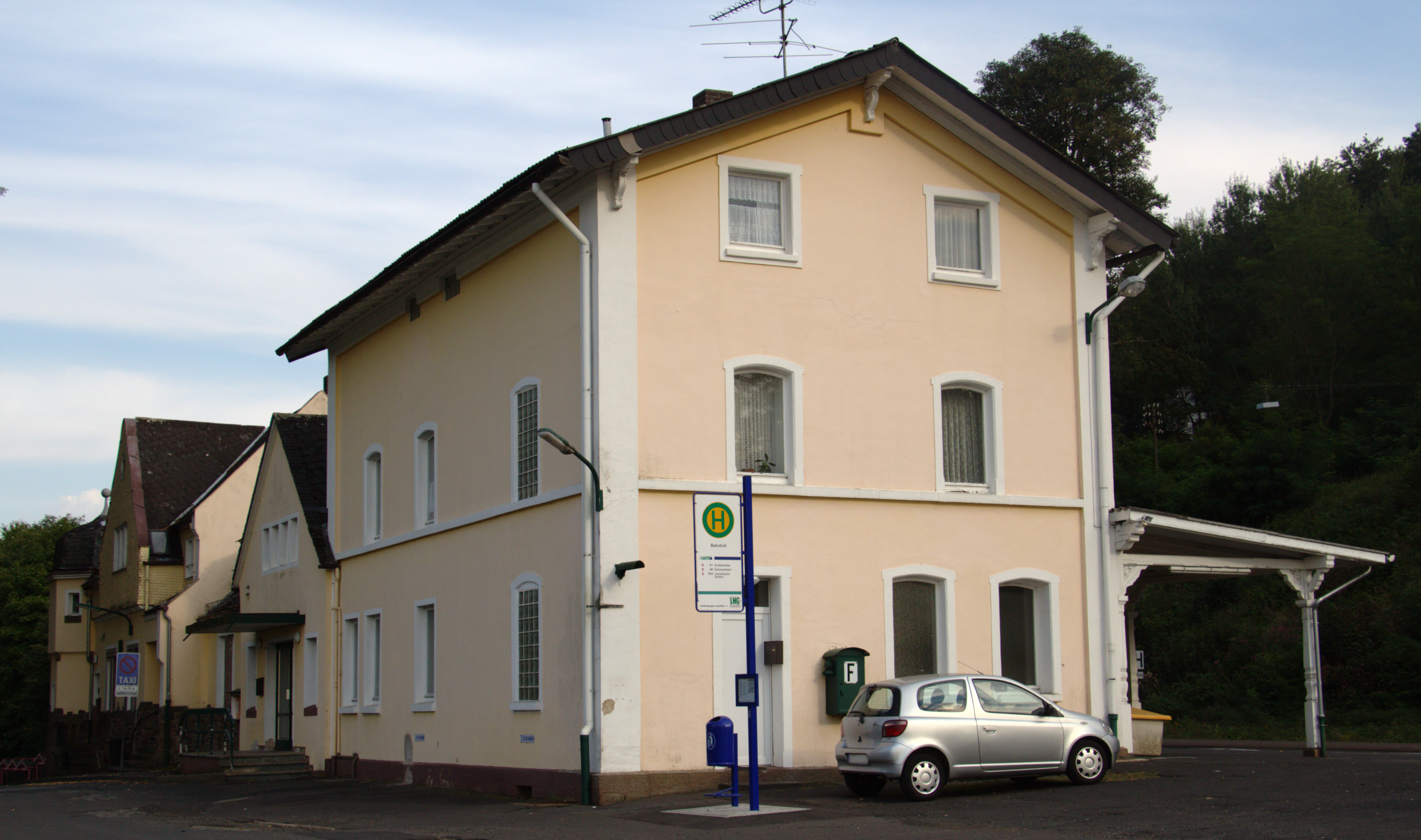
- Entrance building in 2013

General information
- Location: Bahnhofstr. 42, Bad Salzschlirf, Hesse; Germany
- Coordinates: 50°37′38″N 9°29′35″E
- Lines: Vogelsberg Railway (km 85.9); Bad Salzschlirf–Niederjossa railway (km 0.0) (closed)
- Platforms: 2

Construction
- Accessible: Yes

Other information
- Station code: 331
- DS100 code: FSF
- IBNR: 8000743
- Category: 6
- Fare zone: : 2125
- Website: www.bahnhof.de

History
- Opened: 31 December 1870

Services
Preceding station	Hessische Landesbahn	Following station
Angersbach towards Limburg (Lahn)	RB 45	Großenlüder towards Fulda
Location

Bad Salzschlirf station is the only station in the spa town of Bad Salzschlirf in the German state of Hesse and is located on the Vogelsberg Railway (Vogelsbergbahn) from Gießen to Fulda. The railway to Niederjossa branched off at the station from 1898 to 1989.

== History ==
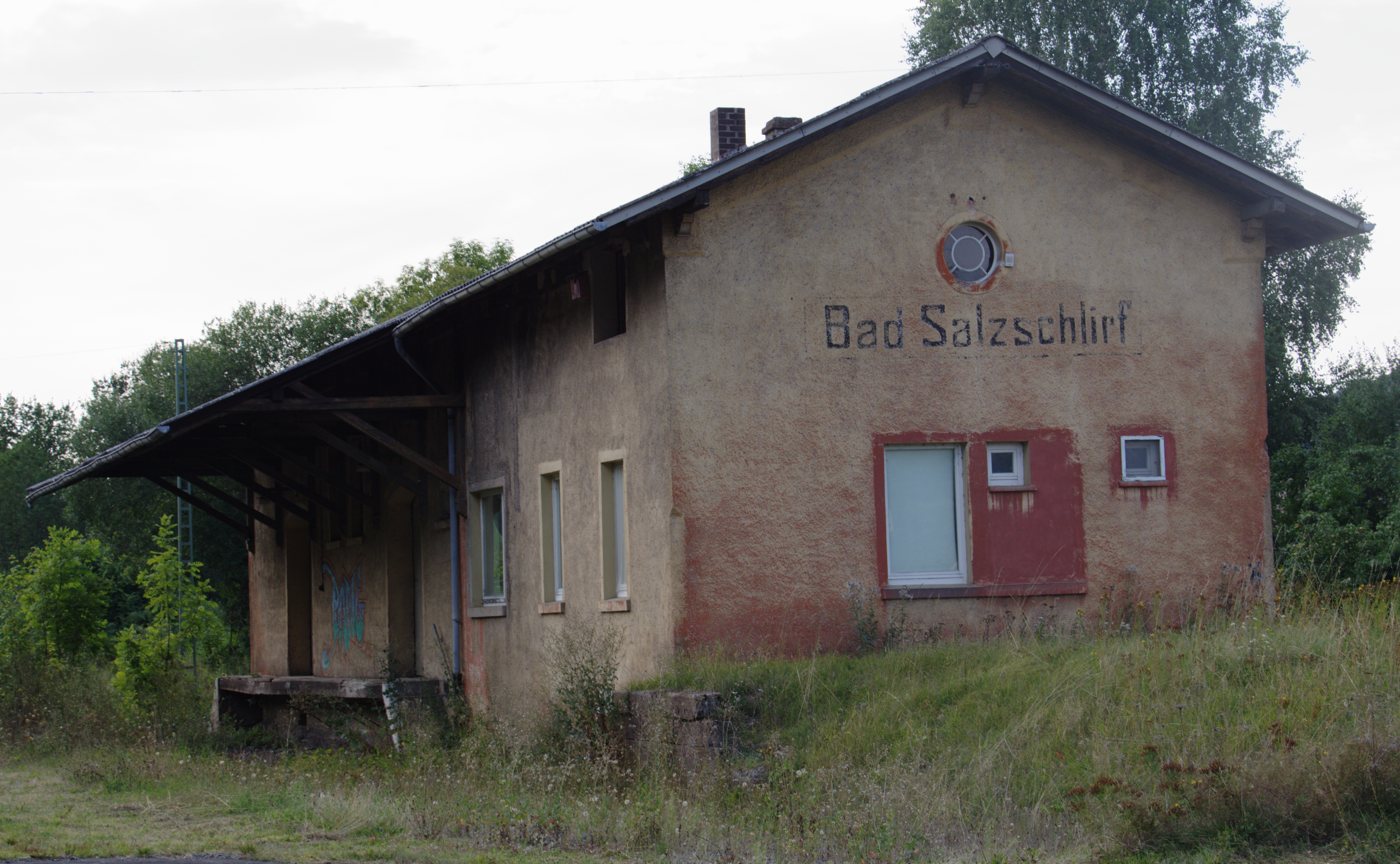
Former goods shed, 2013

Bad Salzschlirf station was opened as a terminus when the third section of the Vogelsberg Railway (Lauterbach Nord–Bad Salzschlirf) was put into operation on 31 December 1870. The Vogelsberg Railway was completed with the extension to Fulda on 31 July 1871.

The line to Schlitz opened on 1 October 1898 and Bad Salzschlirf became a railway junction. An extension was opened from Schlitz to Niederjossa on the Niederaula–Alsfeld railway in 1914. Passenger traffic on the Bad Salzschlirf–Niederjossa railway was abandoned on 31 May 1964 and the section to Schlitz was closed in 1989. A rail trail was created on the former track.

In September 2009, Deutsche Bahn chairman Rüdiger Grube announced that it would spend a total of €24.6 million from the economic stimulus program II to upgrade the Vogelsberg Railway by 2011. The modernisation work lasted from mid-June 2010 to the summer of 2011.

Since the timetable change 2011/2012 on 11 December 2011, passenger services have been operated by Hessische Landesbahn (HLB) with LINT 41 diesel multiple units.

== Rail infrastructure ==
The neoclassical entrance building was built in 1870 with the opening of the Vogelsberg Railway. The ticket office has been closed since 1 September 1998.

Bad Salzschlirf station has two platforms. Platform 1, next to the station building, is served both by trains towards Giessen and towards Fulda. Platform 2 on the island platform is used only when trains are crossing, but there are no scheduled crossings at the station in the current timetable. The platforms do not have barrier-free access.

== Connections ==
Train fares at the station are set by the Rhein-Main-Verkehrsverbund (RMV).

Since the decommissioning of the Bad Salzschlirf–Niederjossa railway, the station has only been used by trains on the Vogelsberg Railway.

The station is served daily by hourly Regionalbahn services on the Limburg (Lahn)–Weilburg–Wetzlar–Gießen–Alsfeld–Fulda route. Some bus routes stop at the railway station, which connect with the surrounding municipalities of Landkreis Fulda and Vogelsbergkreis.

Since the 2016/2017 timetable change on 11 December 2016, services on the Vogelsberg Railway (formerly RB 35) and the subsequent Lahn Valley Railway (formerly RB 25) have run as RB 45.

Line	Route	Interval
RB 45	Lahn Valley Railway / Vogelsberg Railway; Limburg (Lahn) – Eschhofen – Weilburg – Wetzlar – Gießen – Grünberg (Oberhess) – Mücke (Hess) – Alsfeld (Oberhess) – Bad Salzschlirf – Fulda	Hourly (+ additional services in the peak)
