= Arfurt (Lahn) station =

Railway station in Hesse, Germany

Arfurt (Lahn)
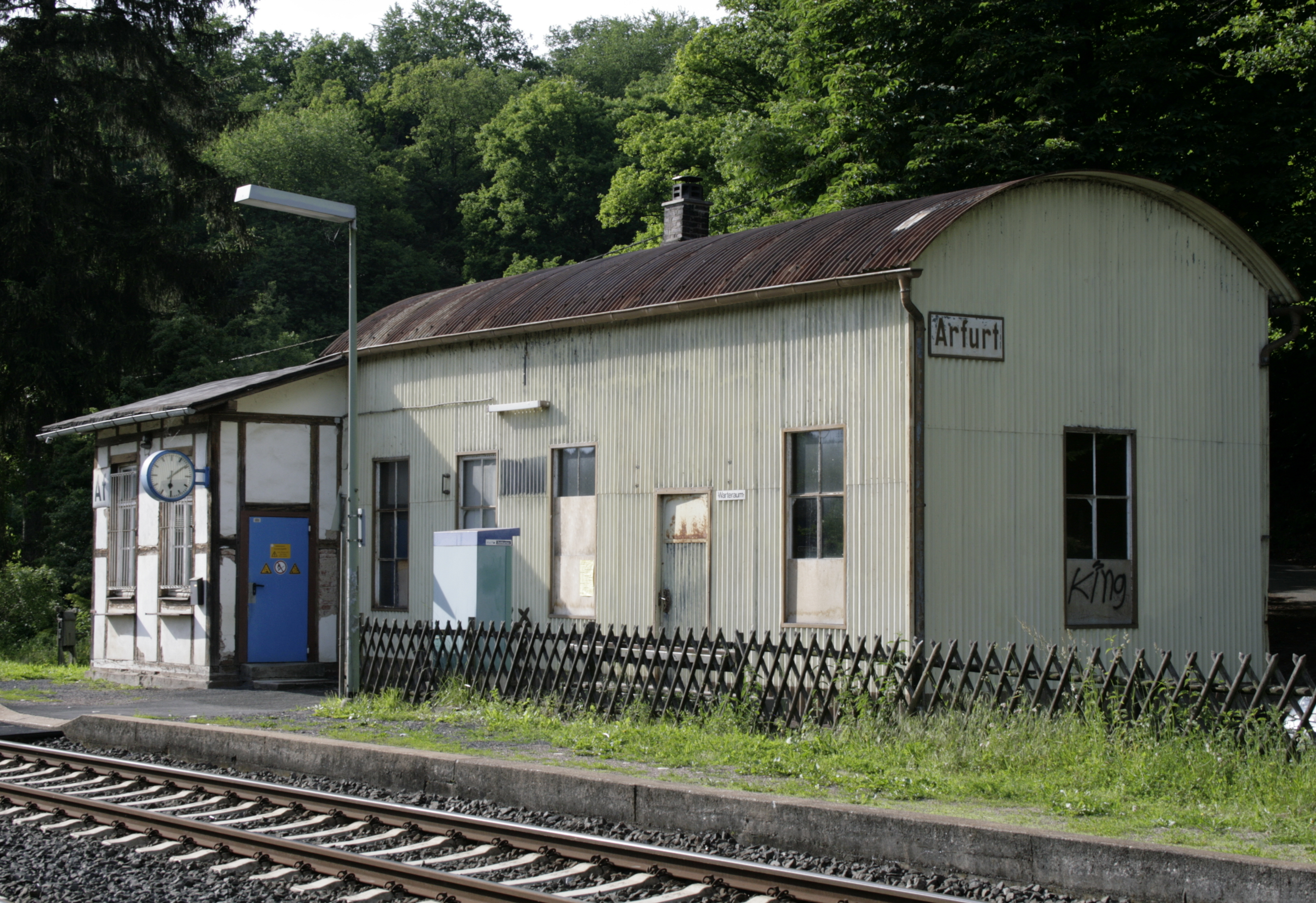
- Entrance building

General information
- Location: Am Bahnhof 1, Arfurt, Runkel, Hesse; Germany
- Coordinates: 50°24′23″N 8°12′40″E
- Line: Lahn Valley Railway (km 38.1) (625)
- Platforms: 2

Construction
- Accessible: Platform 1 only

Other information
- Station code: 173
- DS100 code: FAF
- IBNR: 8000599
- Category: 6
- Fare zone: : 6012
- Website: www.bahnhof.de

History
- Opened: About 1900

Services
Preceding station	Hessische Landesbahn	Following station
Villmar towards Limburg (Lahn)	RB 45	Aumenau towards Fulda
Location
- Location within Hesse

Arfurt (Lahn) is a station (classified as a halt) in the Runkel district of Arfurt in the German state of Hesse on the Lahn Valley Railway (Lahntalbahn).

== History ==
Originally, Arfurt did not have a station on the Lahn Valley Railway. Between 1860 and 1862, however, a track attendant’s house (Streckenwärterhaus) was built at the bottom of the village with the opening of the section of the railway between the stations of Limburg (Lahn) and Weilburg on 14 October 1862.

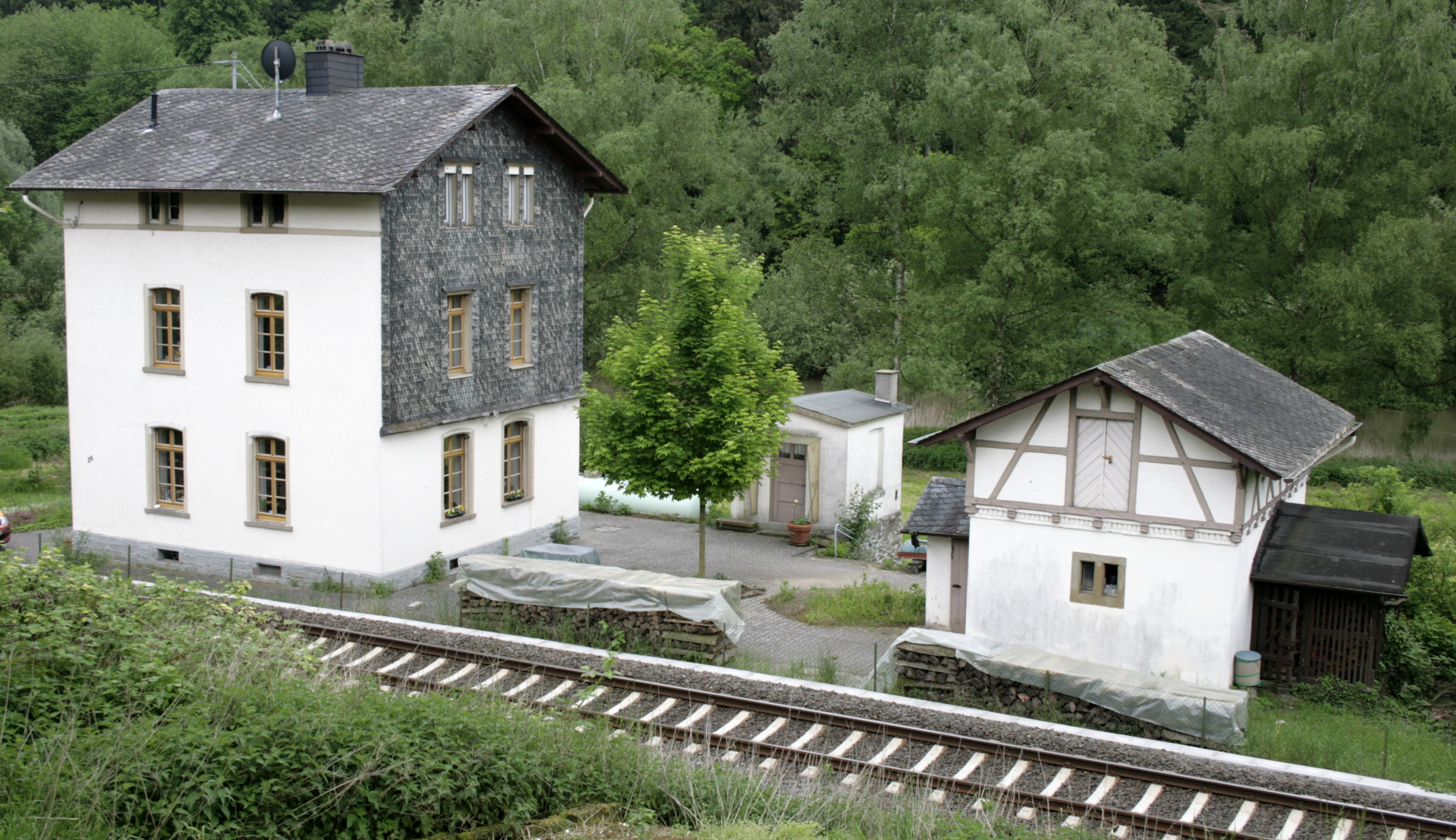
The heritage-listed former track attendant’s house

The two-and-a-half-storey building with a flat gable roof consists of plastered brickwork, which has been partly altered. There are windows on two vertical axes with cornices. The associated stables has a knee wall made of wood. Both buildings, which are now privately owned, are heritage-listed; the reason for this includes its location at the foot of the village.

Arfurt (Lahn) station is located about one kilometre away from Arfurt and also serves Seelbach, which is a district of Villmar. It can only be reached via paved paths from both villages. The halt (Haltepunkt) was built in 1897 as a freight-loading point for Lahnkalkwerk (Lahn Limestone Works) Auerberg; passenger traffic was also served shortly afterwards.

The station buildings form a unique combination of half-timbered and corrugated iron buildings. Like the entire line, this building is also a heritage-listed monument. While the corrugated iron hut serves as a waiting room, a small signal box is housed in the half-timbered building, which is still used today. Due to the lack of funding, this situation will continue to exist at least until 2020, despite increasing structural deficiencies. The station has 400 metre-long platforms, which were raised to a height of 38 cm and paved over a length of 140 metres from October 2011. The platform lighting was also renewed, and a waiting room was built.

Unlike most stations on the Lahn Valley Railway, Arfurt station is hardly used by bicycle tourists as the Lahn Valley cycleway (Lahntalradweg) runs on the other side of the river. In 2012, around 80 passengers were counted at the station on working days.

== Rail services ==
Regionalbahn (RB 45) services operated by Deutsche Bahn run hourly on the Lahn Valley Railway between Limburg and Giessen, some continuing to Alsfeld and Fulda. Since the timetable change of 2011/2012 on 11 December 2011, the RB services on this section of the Lahn Valley Railway have been operated by the Hessische Landesbahn. Alstom Coradia Lint 41 (class 648) sets are used. The Regional-Express (RE 25) services run through the station without stopping. The RE services are operated with Alstom Coradia LINT 27 and 41 (class 640 and 648) railcars and Bombardier Talent (class 643) sets.

The following service stops in Arfurt (Lahn) station:

Line	Route	Frequency
RB 45 Lahntalbahn	Limburg (Lahn) – Eschhofen – Arfurt (Lahn) – Weilburg – Wetzlar – Gießen – Alsfeld (– Fulda)	Hourly (+ extra trains in the peak)
