= Aumenau station =

Railway station in Hesse, Germany

Aumenau
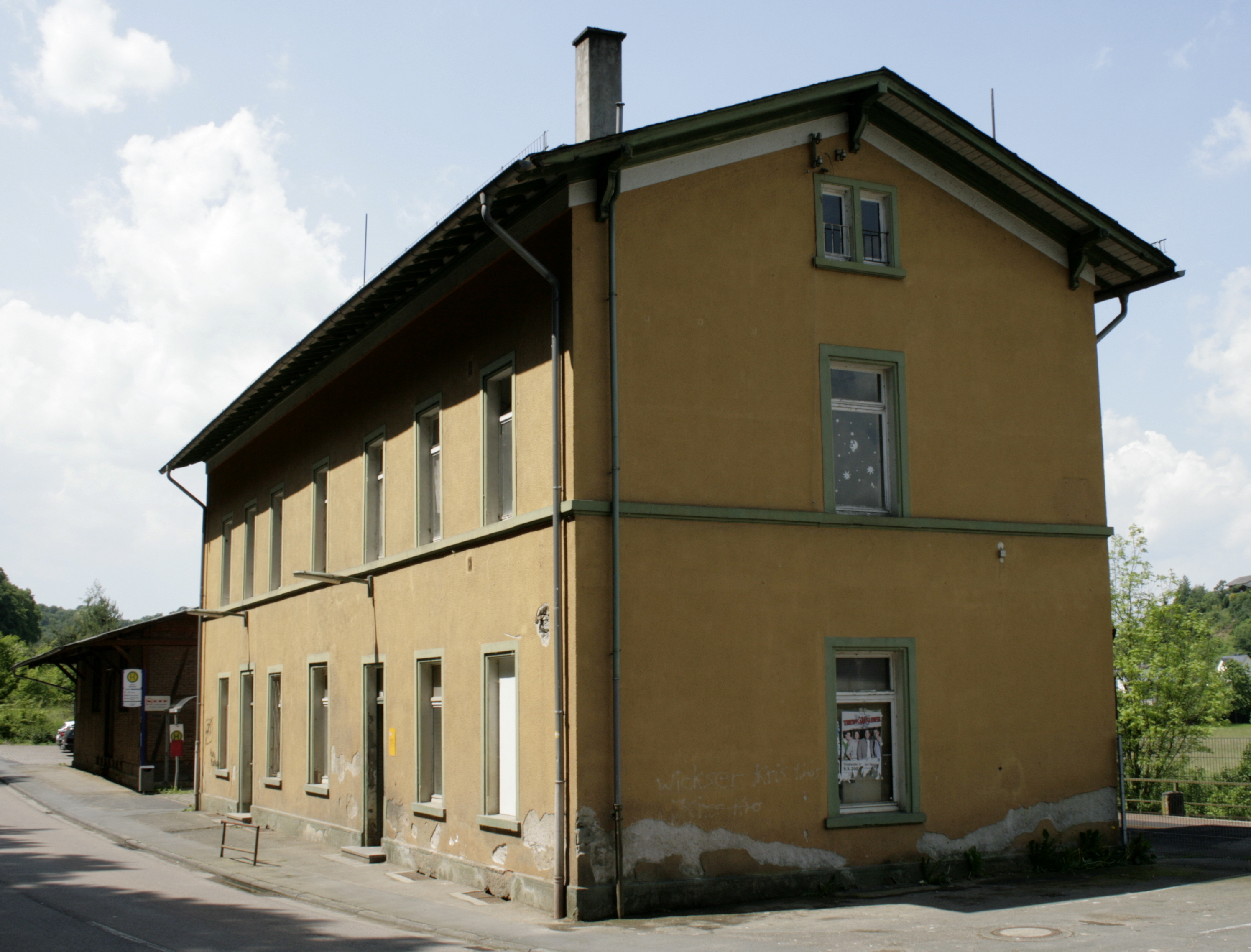

General information
- Location: Überlahn 1, Aumenau, Villmar, Hesse; Germany
- Coordinates: 50°24′01″N 8°14′58″E
- Line: Lahn Valley Railway (km 35.0) (625)
- Platforms: 2

Construction
- Accessible: Platform 1

Other information
- Station code: 228
- DS100 code: FAUM
- IBNR: 8000668
- Category: 6
- Fare zone: : 6030
- Website: www.bahnhof.de

History
- Opened: 10 January 1863

Services
| Preceding station | Hessische Landesbahn | Following station |
|---|---|---|
| Arfurt (Lahn) towards Limburg (Lahn) | RB 45 | Fürfurt towards Fulda |
Location

Aumenau is a station in the German state of Hesse on the Lahn Valley Railway (Lahntalbahn). It is located opposite the village of Aumenau, in the municipality of Villmar on the banks of the Lahn.

== History ==
Like the majority of the stations on the line, the station building, which was built in 1862 with windows on seven vertical axes, was built to a standard design. The storage sheds were built around 1900. However, the signal box lodge situated to the west of the station tracks, which was probably built around 1950, is built in the same style. The entire complex has heritage protection.

The station served primarily mineral traffic. Since the beginning of the 20th century, there has been an almost continuously-operated station restaurant.

== Rail services ==
Deutsche Bahn operates Regionalbahn services on the Lahn Valley Railway between Limburg and Gießen, some continuing to Alsfeld and Fulda. Since the timetable change of 2011/2012 on 11 December 2011, the RB services on this section of the Lahn Valley Railway have been operated by Hessische Landesbahn. Alstom Coradia Lint 41 (class 648) sets are used. The Regional-Express (RE 25) services run through the station without stopping. The RE services are operated with Alstom Coradia LINT 27 and 41 (class 640 and 648) railcars and Bombardier Talent (class 643) sets.

The following service stops in Aumenau station:

| Line | Route | Frequency |
|---|---|---|
| RB 45 Lahntalbahn | Limburg (Lahn) – Eschhofen – Aumenau – Weilburg – Wetzlar – Gießen – Alsfeld (– Fulda) | Hourly (+ extra trains in the peak) |
