= Dutenhofen station =

Railway station in Wetzlar, Germany

Dutenhofen (Kr Wetzlar)
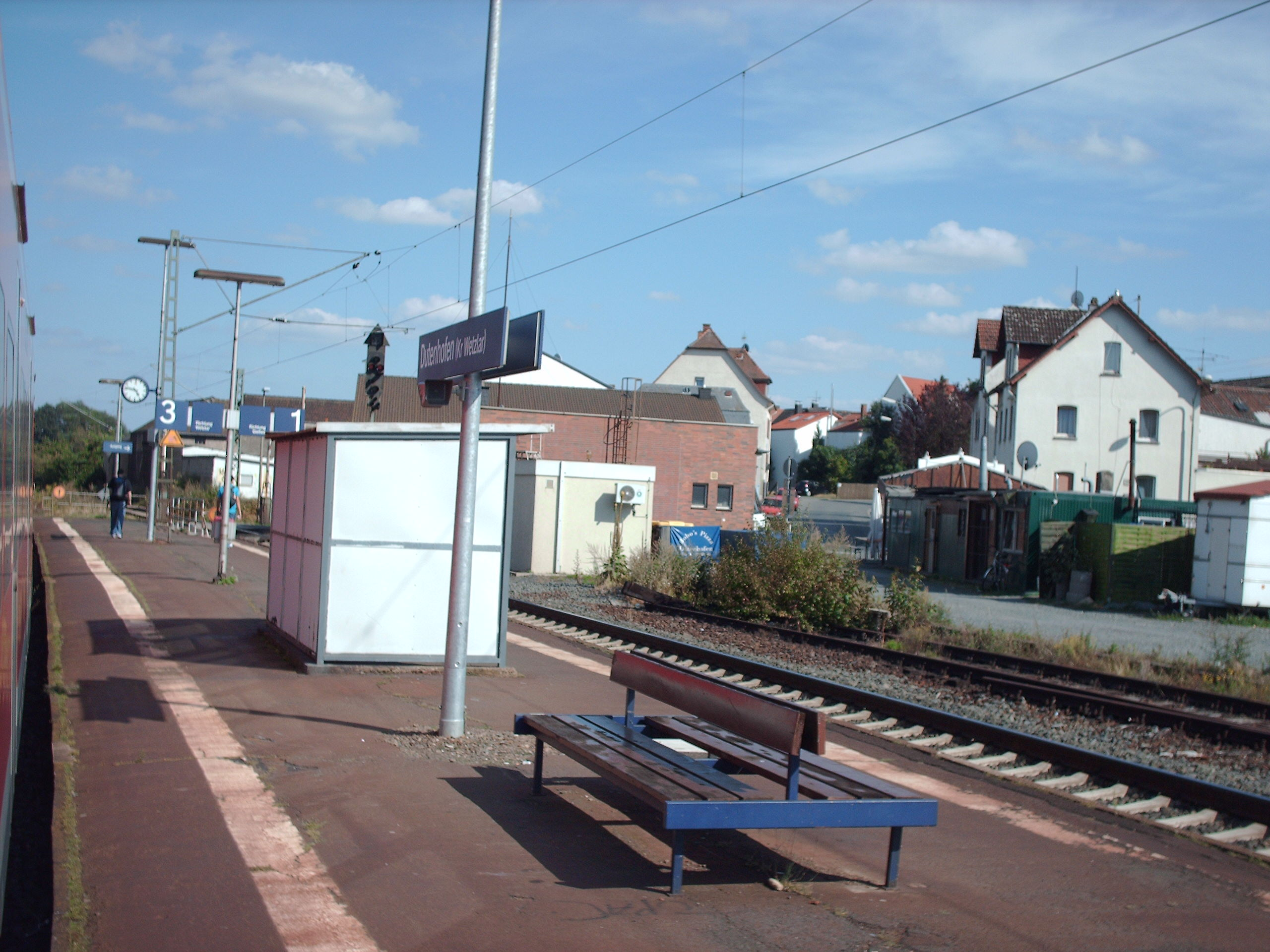

General information
- Location: Bahnhofstr. 50, Wetzlar, Hesse; Germany
- Coordinates: 50°33′51″N 8°35′56″E
- Lines: Dill Railway (160.6 km) (KBS 455); Dutenhofen–Gießen-Bergwald connecting line
- Platforms: 2

Construction
- Accessible: No

Other information
- Station code: 1424
- DS100 code: FDTH
- IBNR: 8001618
- Category: 6
- Fare zone: : 5533
- Website: www.bahnhof.de

Services
Preceding station	DB Regio Mitte	Following station
Wetzlar towards Dillenburg	RB 40	Gießen towards Frankfurt (Main) Hbf
Preceding station	Hessische Landesbahn	Following station
Wetzlar towards Limburg (Lahn)	RB 45	Gießen towards Fulda
Location
- Location within Hesse

Dutenhofen station (officially: Dutenhofen (Kr Wetzlar) or Dutenhofen (Wetzlar)) is a junction station in Dutenhofen, the eastmost borough of the city of Wetzlar in the German state of Hesse. It is classified by Deutsche Bahn (DB) as a category 6 station. It is much less important than Wetzlar station and is located in the north of the suburb of Dutenhofen, near the B 49. The station is located next to a level crossing over the road to Dutenhofener See. East of the station is a junction where the Dill line to Gießen separates from the freight line that bypasses Gießen, running to the junction at Bergwald on the Main-Weser Railway. Since 1962, signalling at the station has been controlled by a small relay interlocking, which is housed in the front of the entrance building.

== Operations ==
The station is equipped with two platform tracks adjoining a central platform. Between the two main tracks at the western end of the platform there is a passing loop. The station is a stop for the Mittelhessen-Express (RB 40) service on the Dill line from Dillenburg station to Gießen and Frankfurt. In the morning peak the station is served by an RE-Sprinter service of the Main-Sieg-Express from Siegen towards Gießen, which is operated with double-deck carriages.

Since the introduction of the 2016/2017 timetable in December 2016, Regionalbahn service RB 45 on the Lahn Valley Railway stops in Dutenhofen in order to improve services. This service is operated by Hessische Landesbahn, which now operates all passenger services on the Lahn Valley Railway.
