= Johannes Ludewig =

German politician, manager (born 1945)

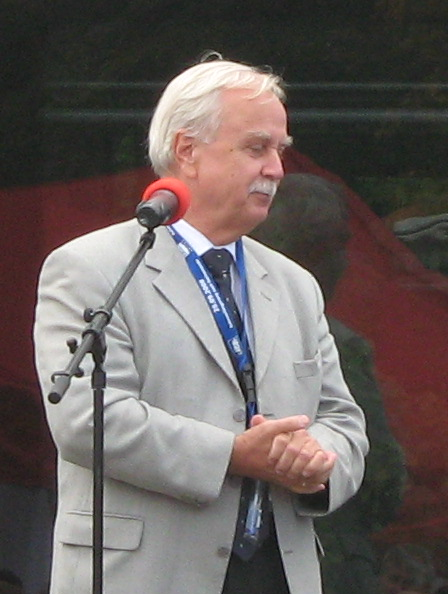

Johannes Ludewig (born 6 July 1945, in Hamburg) is a German manager and former secretary of state. He was executive director of Community of European Railway and Infrastructure Companies (CER) from 2002 until 2011.

Preceded by Heinz Dürr	CEO of Deutsche Bahn AG; 1997 – 1999	Succeeded by Hartmut Mehdorn
