= Bad Nauheim station =

Railway station in Bad Nauheim, Germany

Bad Nauheim
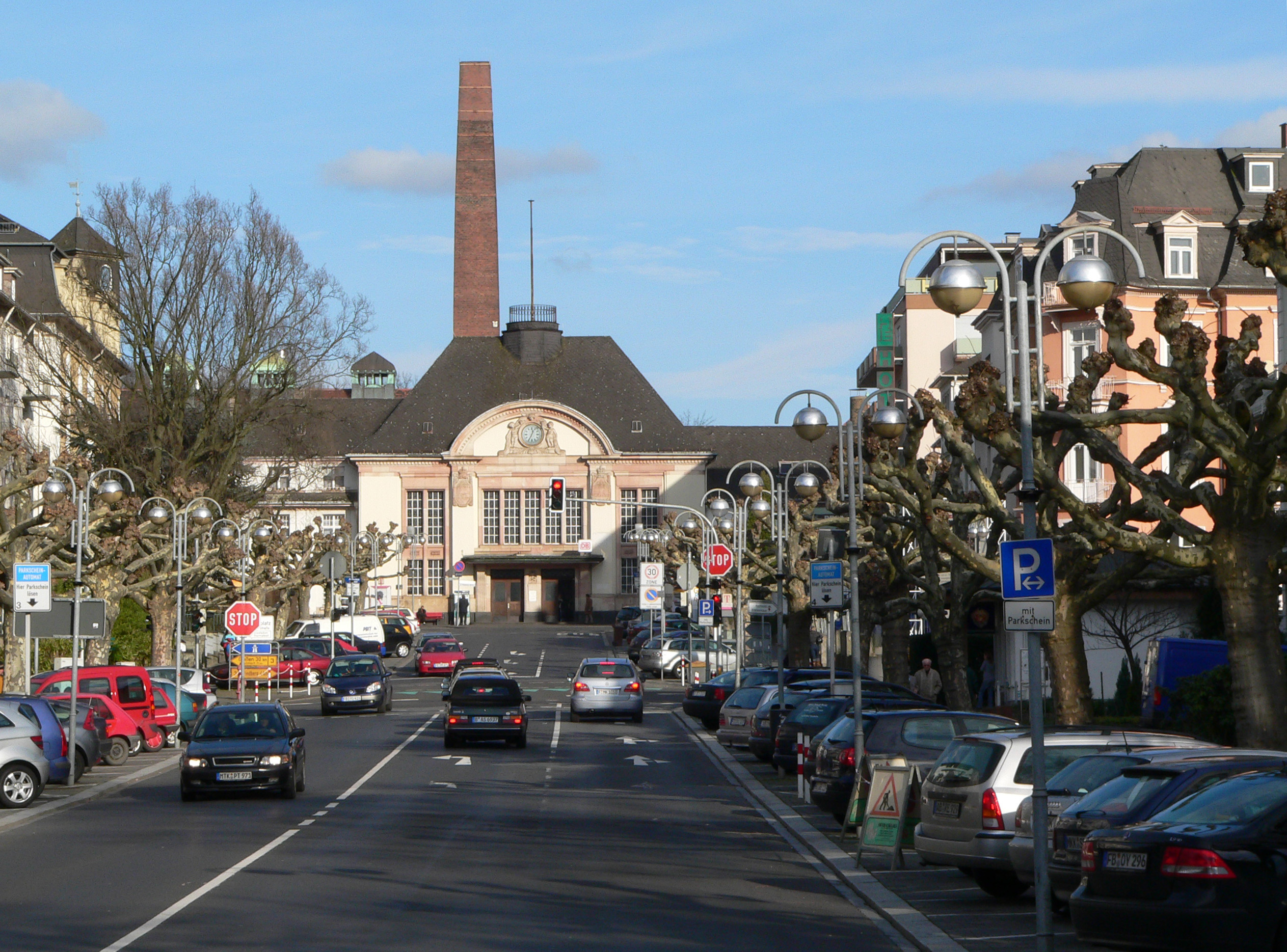
- Station building from the street

General information
- Location: Bahnhofsallee 12, Bad Nauheim, Hesse; Germany
- Coordinates: 50°22′04″N 8°44′58″E
- Owner: Deutsche Bahn
- Operator: DB Station&Service
- Lines: Main–Weser Railway (161.9 km); Butzbach-Lich Railway (10.6 km)
- Platforms: 3
- Connections: Bus interchange

Construction
- Accessible: Yes
- Architect: Armin Wegner
- Architectural style: Neo-classical

Other information
- Station code: 310
- DS100 code: FBNA
- IBNR: 8000728
- Category: 4
- Fare zone: : 2520
- Website: www.bahnhof.de

History
- Opened: 9 November 1850

Passengers
- About 4,000

Services
Preceding station	DB Fernverkehr	Following station
Wetzlar towards Dortmund Hbf or Münster Hbf	IC 34	Frankfurt West towards Frankfurt (Main) Hbf or Friedberg (Hess)
Preceding station	DB Regio Mitte	Following station
Butzbach towards Kassel Hbf	RE 30	Friedberg towards Frankfurt (Main) Hbf
Butzbach towards Gießen	RB 49	Friedberg towards Hanau Hbf
Preceding station	Hessische Landesbahn	Following station
Butzbach towards Dillenburg	RB 40	Friedberg towards Frankfurt (Main) Hbf
Butzbach towards Treysa	RB 41	Friedberg towards Frankfurt (Main) Hbf
Wetzlar towards Siegen Hbf	RE 99	Bad Vilbel towards Frankfurt (Main) Hbf
Location
- Location within Hesse Location within Germany Location within Europe

Bad Nauheim station is a station in the town of Bad Nauheim in the German state of Hesse on the Main–Weser Railway. The station is classified by Deutsche Bahn (DB) as a category 4 station.

== History ==
The station went into operation with the opening of the section between Butzbach and Friedberg on 9 November 1850. The original buildings were designed by Julius Eugen Ruhl, but they were replaced by new buildings between 1911 and 1913. As part of a general renovation in preparation for the state horticultural show held in 2010 in Bad Nauheim, the platform heights were increased to 76 cm to provide barrier-free access for the disabled, tactile paving was installed for the visually impaired and the station was given a friendlier appearance overall.

== Tracks ==
Bad Nauheim station has a platform next to the station building and an island platform, a total of three platform edges. On the opposite side of the tracks there is the station building of Bad Nauheim Nord station of the Butzbach-Lich Railway (German: Butzbach-Licher Eisenbahn, BLE). Historical tourist trains are operated from there by Eisenbahnfreunde Wetterau (railway friends of Wetterau, EFW) to Münzenberg. The track connecting Bad Nauheim station to the former state railway is not currently in use. A peculiarity of the Butzbach-Lich Railway is that it runs through the station’s park and ride facility.

== Buildings ==
The station building and the rest of the station buildings are now mostly listed as monuments under the Hessian Heritage Act.

=== Entrance building ===
The current station building was built between 1911 and 1913 in a neo-classical style designed by Armin Wegner. The facade carries both a Prussian and a Hessian coat of arms, since Bad Nauheim was in the Grand Duchy of Hesse, but the station and the Main-Weser Railway were operated by the Prussian state railways. The building has a Deutsche Bahn ticket office, several Rhein-Main-Verkehrsverbund ticket machines and a DB ticket machine for long-distance tickets. There is also a bookstore and a florist in the station.

=== Royal pavillon ===
South of the reception building there is a royal pavillon (Fürstenpavillon). It was built during the reconstruction of the station between 1911 and 1913 and has a pagoda-like roof. It is on the axis of Lessingstraße, clearly separated from the public entrance building. It has an open hall on the platform side. After it lost its original use with the abolition of the monarchy after World War I, it was used by the German Post Office and it is now used by Diakonisches Werk, a charity.

== Services ==
Before the First World War, Bad Nauheim was the starting point of the Bäderbahn (spa railway), express trains operated between the spas of Bad Nauheim, Bad Homburg and Wiesbaden.

Bad Nauheim is now (2026) served by the RB 49 Regionalbahn service on the Friedberg-Giessen route. The Mittelhessen-Express (RB 40 / RB41) services also stop in Bad Nauheim. However, Regional-Express services on the Frankfurt Hbf–Siegen route (the Main-Sieg-Express) and the Frankfurt–Kassel Hauptbahnhof route (the Main-Weser-Express, RE 30) and long-distance trains do not stop in Bad Nauheim. Morning and afternoon services operating as RE-Sprinter services of the Main-Sieg-Express (RE 99), which provide commuters with a fast connection to Frankfurt, stop in Bad Nauheim, but are the only services on the line to skip the neighbouring station of Friedberg. Five train pairs on the IC 34 also stop at the station, running between Frankfurt or Friedberg and Dortmund or Münster. In the 2026 timetable, the following services stopped at the station:
