= Hartmut Mehdorn =

German manager and CEO

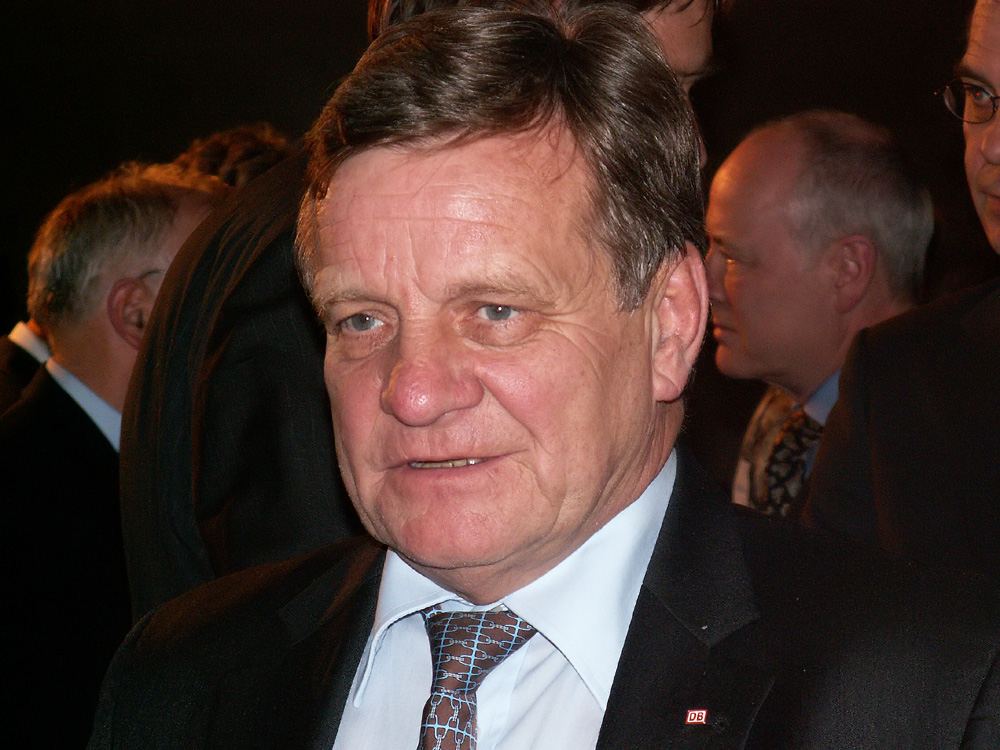
Hartmut Mehdorn in March 2008

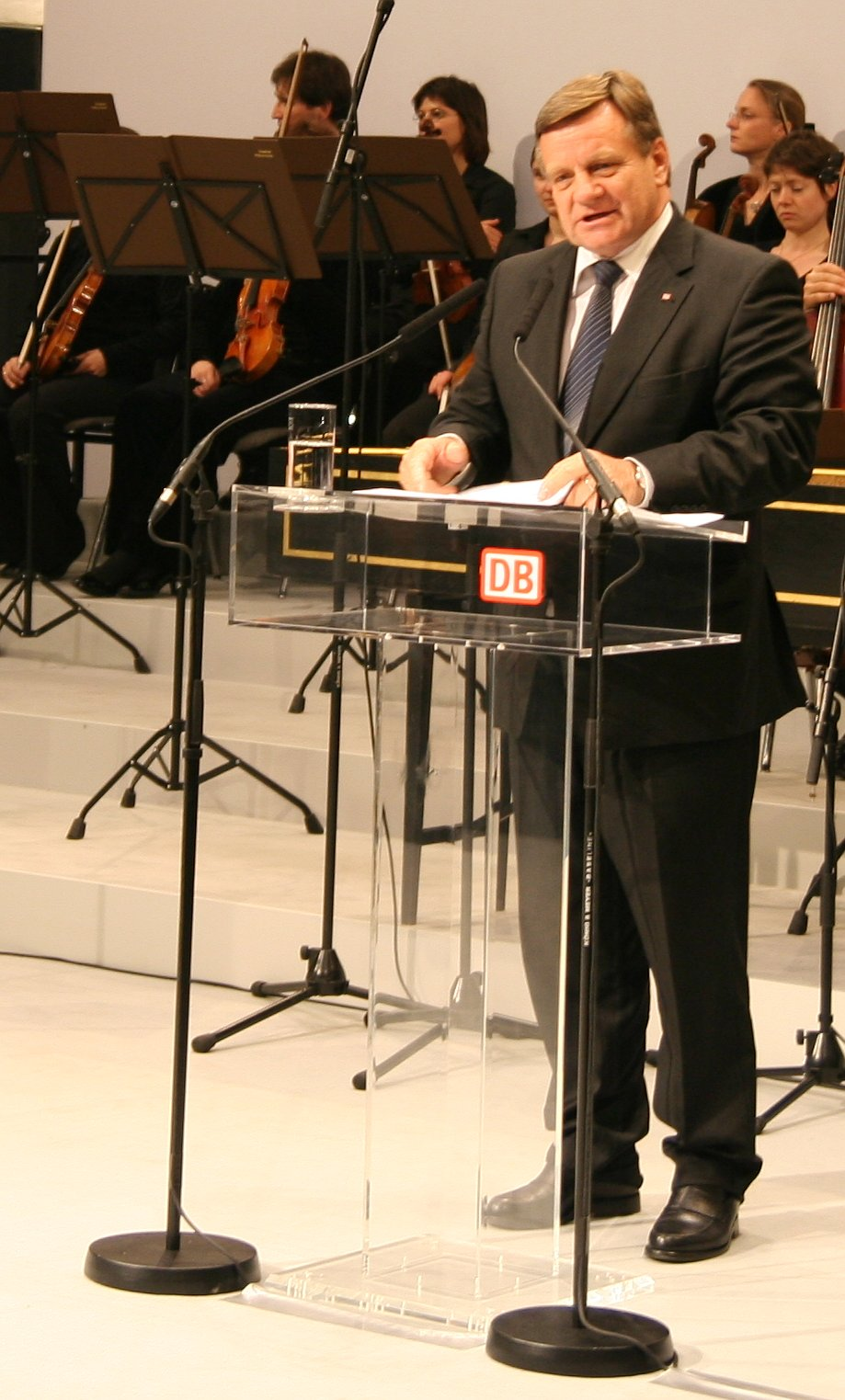
Hartmut Mehdorn during the inauguration ceremony of the redeveloped Dresden Hauptbahnhof

Hartmut Mehdorn (born 31 July 1942 in Warsaw) is a German manager and mechanical engineer. Until May 2009 he was CEO of Deutsche Bahn, Germany's biggest railway company. He was CEO of Germany's second largest airline Air Berlin until he stepped down in January 2013. In March 2013 he assumed a CEO position at Flughafen Berlin Brandenburg GmbH (FBB), the owner and future operator of Berlin Brandenburg Airport, until March 2015.

== Other activities ==
- Russian Railways (RZD), Member of the Board of Directors (2011–2018)

== Personal life ==
Mehdorn is married to Frenchwoman Hélène Mehdorn (née Vuillequez) and has three grown-up children, two sons and a daughter.

Preceded by Johannes Ludewig	CEO of Deutsche Bahn AG; 1999 – 2009	Succeeded by Rüdiger Grube
