= Dutenhofen =

Coordinates: 50.560°N 8.599°E

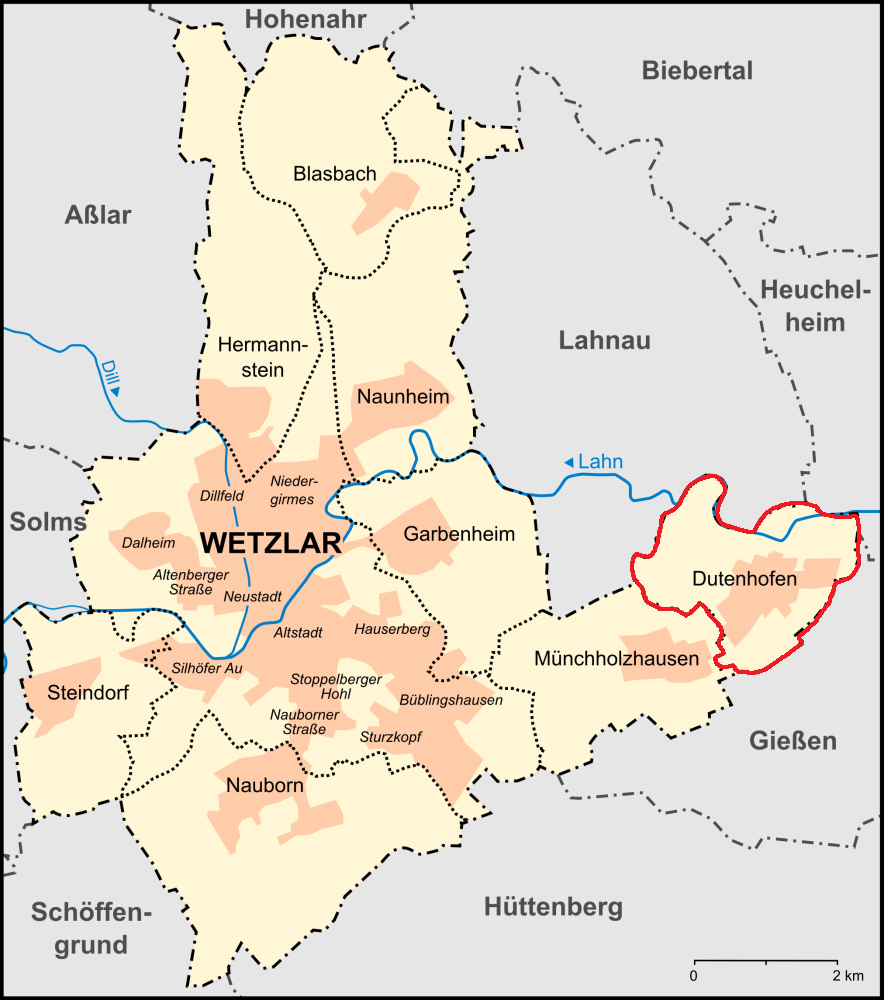
Dutenhofen's location in Wetzlar

Dutenhofen is the eastmost borough of the city of Wetzlar, Germany. It has approximately 3,100 residents (December 31, 2005).

== Geography ==
The district lies in the Lahntal region just south of the Lahn. Nearby is the Dutenhofener See, a lake featuring a man-made beach, volleyball pit, trampolines, cafe, and bar. East of the district lies the OCULUS GmbH industrial park.

== History ==
Dutenhofen was an independent municipality until January 1, 1976, when it became a suburb of the city of Lahn. On August 1, 1979, Dutenhofen became a borough of Wetzlar.

== Sport ==
Dutenhofen is the home of the Handball-Club HSG Dutenhofen-Münchholzhausen, from Bundesligist HSG Wetzlar.

== Transportation ==
Dutenhofen shares busline 11 with the surrounding cities, including Giessen. Directly north of this borough runs the Bundesstraße B49 (Gießen - Wetzlar - Koblenz - Trier). Parallel to the road runs the Deutsche Bahn-line called "Dillstrecke" (Gießen - Wetzlar - Siegen).
