= Alsfeld station =

Railway station in Alsfeld, Germany

Alsfeld (Oberhess)
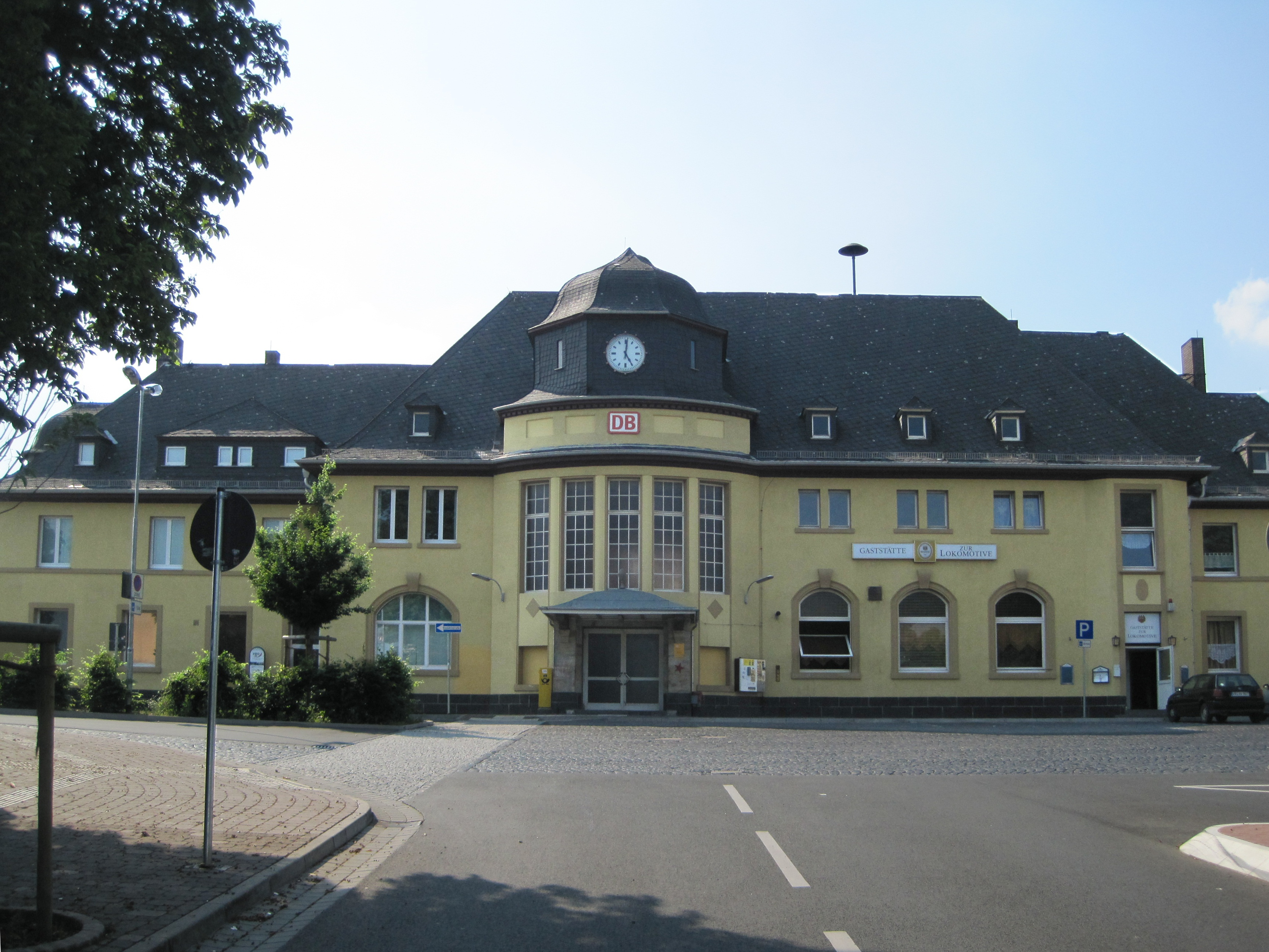
- The entrance building in 2010

General information
- Location: Bahnhofstr. 12, Alsfeld, Hesse; Germany
- Coordinates: 50°45′03″N 9°15′51″E
- Lines: Vogelsberg Railway (km 60.3); Niederaula–Alsfeld railway (km 0.0) (closed)
- Platforms: 3

Construction
- Accessible: No
- Architectural style: Neoclassical

Other information
- Station code: 65
- DS100 code: FAFD
- IBNR: 8000350
- Category: 5
- Fare zone: : 0850
- Website: www.bahnhof.de

History
- Opened: 29 July 1870

Services
Preceding station	Hessische Landesbahn	Following station
Zell-Romrod towards Limburg (Lahn)	RB 45	Lauterbach (Hess) Nord towards Fulda
Location
- Location within Hesse

Alsfeld station is in the town of Alsfeld in the German state of Hesse. It is at line-km 60.3 of the Vogelsberg Railway (Vogelsbergbahn) and line-km 0.0 of the Niederaula–Alsfeld railway, which was closed in 1988. The entrance building, which was built in 1914/15 at Bahnhofstraße 14, is a protected monument.

== History ==
In 1868, the Second Chamber of the Grand Duchy of Hesse decided to build the Oberhessischen Eisenbahn ("Upper Hessian Railway", now called the Vogelsberg Railway) from Gießen via Alsfeld to Fulda. The official opening of the station took place on 29 July 1870 with the opening of the Grünberg–Alsfeld section. The station was the terminus of the trains from Giessen until 30 October, when the next section was opened to Lauterbach. The Vogelsberg Railway was completed on 31 July 1871, so that the cities of Giessen and Fulda were now accessible by rail.

When the Niederaula–Alsfeld railway (Gründchenbahn or Gründchen Railway) was added, the old entrance building was demolished and replaced by the current neoclassical building in 1914-15. The railway facilities were also rebuilt and considerably expanded.

The passenger services towards Niederaula ended in 1974, but freight transport continued on this line between Alsfeld and Eifa until 1988. Most of the freight infrastructure at the station that was no longer required was dismantled in the 2000s and the station building was renovated in 2006.

In September 2009, the chairman of Deutsche Bahn, Rüdiger Grube, announced that the Vogelsberg Railway would be upgraded at a total cost of €24.6 million from an economic stimulus package. The modernisation work lasted from mid-June 2010 to the summer of 2011.

Since the timetable change 2011/2012 on 11 December 2011, passenger services have been operated by the Hessische Landesbahn GmbH (HLB) with LINT 41 diesel multiple units.

== Infrastructure ==
The station is divided into a passenger station and freight yard. In spite of major dismantling in the 2000s, it has an extensive track system.

=== Entrance building ===
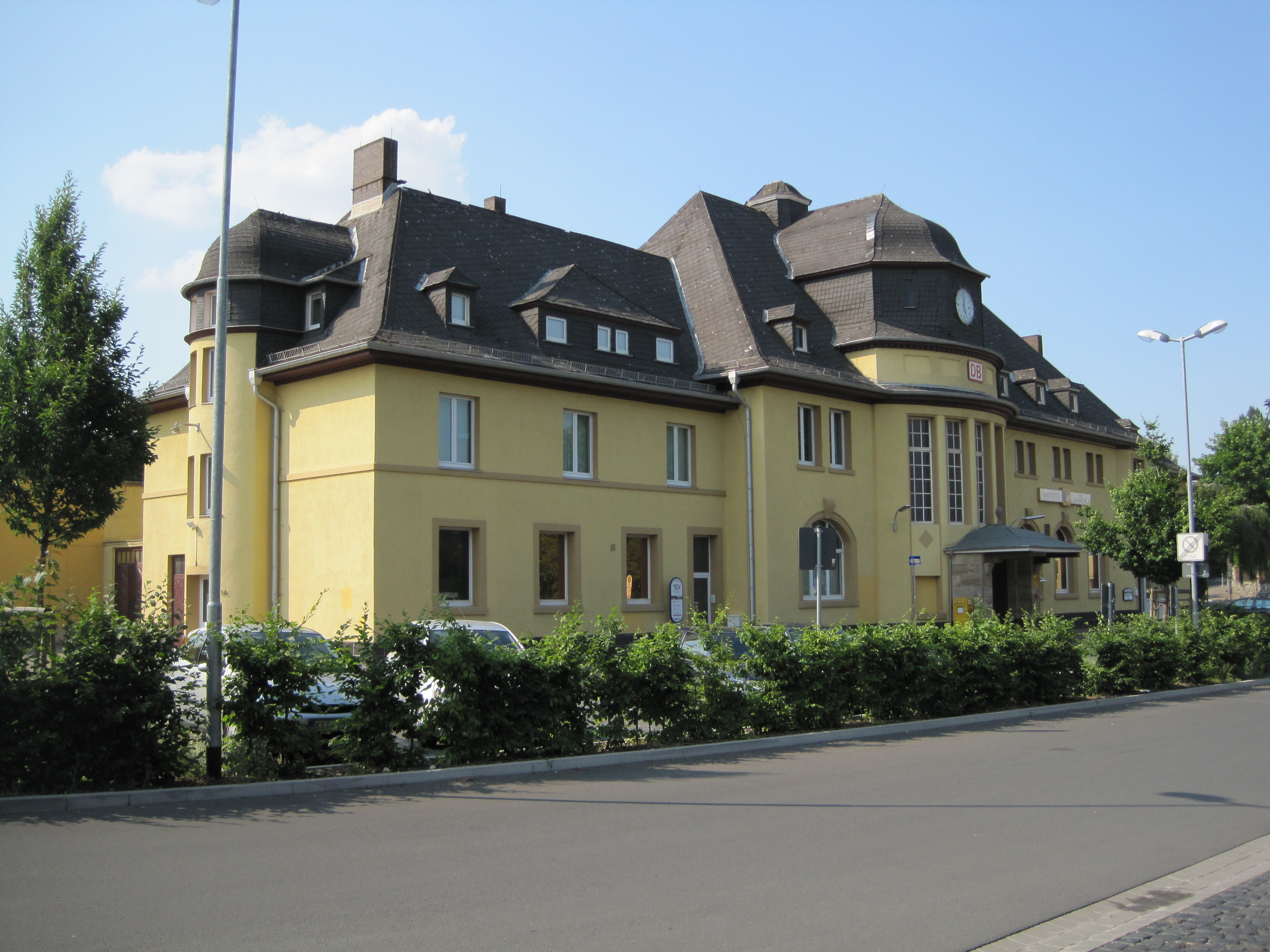
The entrance building viewed from the side

The original entrance building was built in 1869/70 by the Upper Hessian Railway Company (Oberhessische Eisenbahn-Gesellschaft) together with the railway line. It was a simple building, but it was quite big at the time. In 1914 and 1915, it was replaced by a much larger and more stately building, which nowadays has heritage protection. This was made necessary by the construction of the line to Niederaula, since the old entrance building would have become too small. Today the VGO ServiceZentrum is housed here.

=== Signal box ===
The Alsfeld signal box was built to a E 43/50 design in 1968. It is still operated by a train dispatcher and is designated with the abbreviation of "Af".

=== Tracks and platforms ===
Alsfeld station has three platform tracks. Track 1 is located on the 183 metre-long platform next to the entrance buildings and tracks 2 and 3 are on a 191-metre-long island platform. The height of both platforms is 76 cm, which allows easy access to the train. The island platform can be reached via a pedestrian subway, which is not barrier-free. In addition to the platforms, a rarely used siding remains.

South of the passenger station, there are numerous goods, loading and storage sidings, some of which are still in use. Since the rebuilding work carried out in the last few years, however, these are exclusively terminal tracks and only accessible from the north. Only the three platform tracks can still be operated in both directions.

== Connections ==
Train fares at the station are set by the Rhein-Main-Verkehrsverbund (RMV).

The station is served daily by hourly Regionalbahn services on the Limburg (Lahn)–Weilburg–Wetzlar–Gießen–Alsfeld–Fulda route.

Since the 2016/2017 timetable change on 11 December 2016, services on the Vogelsberg Railway (formerly RB 35) and the subsequent Lahn Valley Railway (formerly RB 25) have run as RB 45.

Line	Route	Interval
RB 45	Limburg (Lahn) – Eschhofen – Weilburg – Wetzlar – Gießen – Grünberg (Oberhess) – Mücke (Hess) – Alsfeld (Oberhess) – Fulda	Hourly
