= Rüdiger Grube =

German businessman

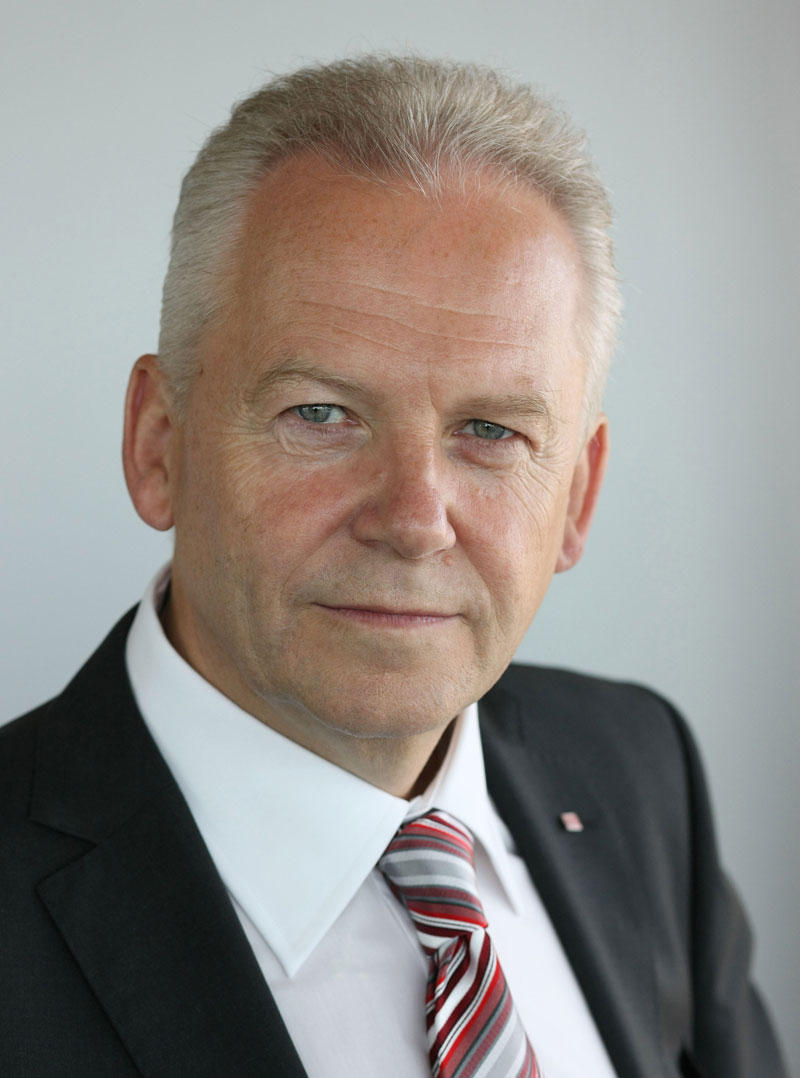
Grube in 2009

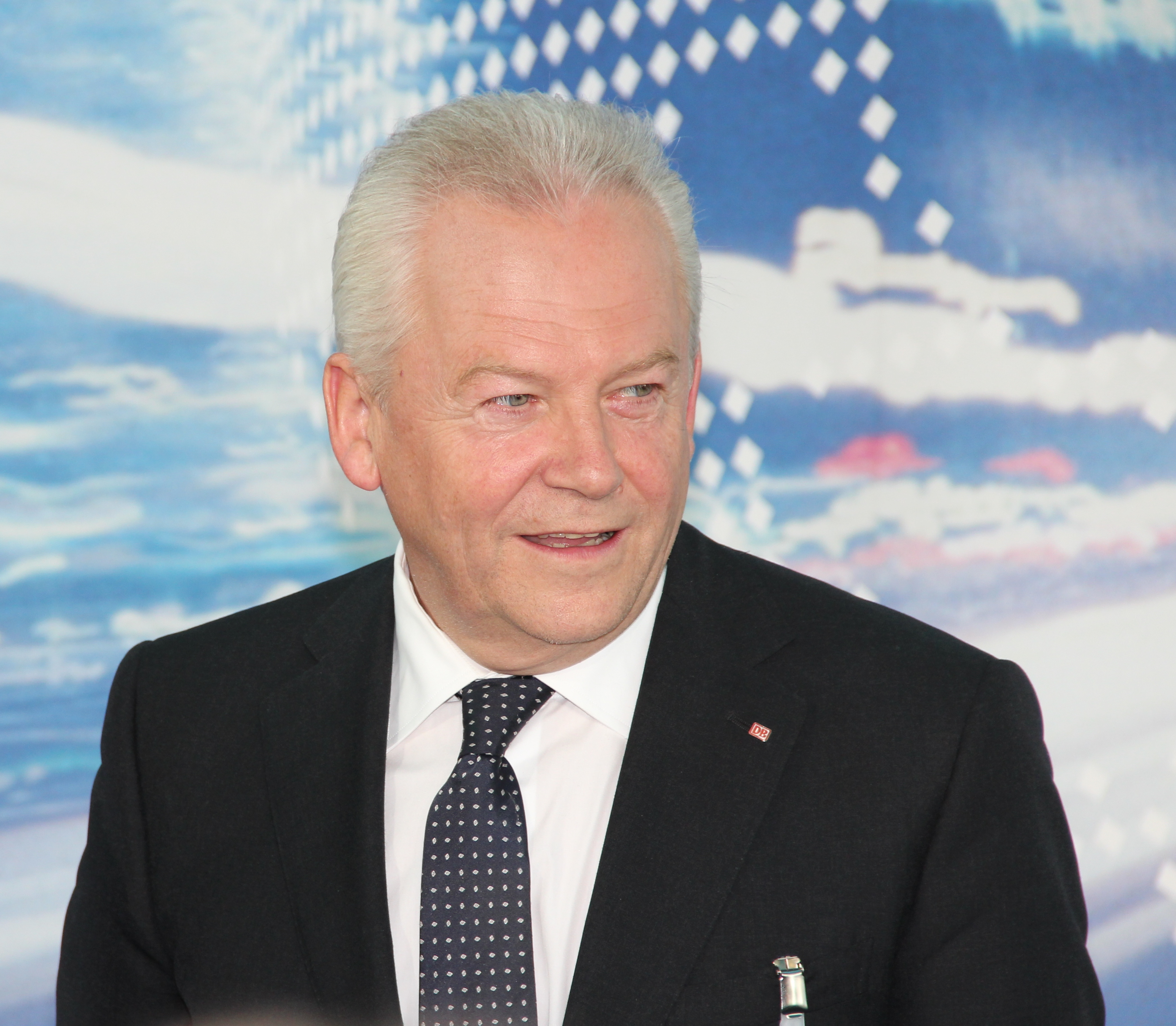
Grube, then-CEO of Deutsche Bahn, Germany – during the Electromobility Summit 2013 in Berlin

Rüdiger Grube (born 2 August 1951) is a German engineer who served as the chairman of the board of Deutsche Bahn from 2009 until 2017 and as the chairman of EADS from 2007 until 2009.

== Early life ==
Grube was born in Hamburg in 1951. He grew up on a farm. After technical training in metal aircraft construction, he went on to study automotive engineering and aircraft construction at the University of Applied Sciences in Hamburg, graduating as a qualified engineer. He studied vocational and business teaching there also at a later date. Between 1981 and 1986, he taught in production and engineering at the university, before completing a doctorate in industrial science and polytechnology.

== Career ==
Grube started his career in 1989 at Messerschmitt-Bölkow-Blohm and went on to work in a number of posts at DaimlerBenz including senior vice president and head of corporate strategy. He also worked for DaimlerChrysler, working closely with Jürgen E. Schrempp.

On April 25, 2009, Grube signed a five-year contract to succeed Hartmut Mehdorn as Chief Executive Officer of Deutsche Bahn, starting from May 1, 2009. The company at the time had been hit very hard by the recession and was facing questions over some of its technology-based decisions. Grube announced cuts at the firm. In 2015, after the longest driver strike in the company's history, Grube launched another restructuring to cut costs and modernize the rail system. That year the company recorded a €1.3 billion net loss, despite a slight rise in revenue to nearly €41 billion, a record at the time.

Between 2013 and 2017, Grube accompanied Chancellor Angela Merkel on a total of three state visits abroad.

In January 2017, Grube stepped down over disagreements concerning the extension of his contract which would have expired at the end of the year. The board had been prepared to offer Grube a two-year renewal of his contract, but he was seeking a three-year extension as well as a pay rise. When the board members would not agree on this, he offered his resignation. CFO Richard Lutz became acting CEO.

In July 2017, financial advisory firm and asset manager Lazard appointed Grube as chairman of investment banking in Germany. In addition, he serves as a director for Mitsubishi, McLaren Group, Hyundai and also serves as a non-executive director for EADS.

== Other activities ==
=== Corporate boards ===
- EUREF AG, Chair of the Supervisory Board (since 2024)
- Vodafone Germany, Chair of the Supervisory Board (since 2023)
- Vantage Towers, Independent Chair of the Supervisory Board (since 2020)
- Vossloh, Chair of the Supervisory Board (since 2020)
- Bombardier Transportation, Chairman of the Supervisory Board (since 2019)
- RIB Software, Member of the Supervisory Board (since 2018)
- HHLA, Chair of the Supervisory Board (2017–2025)
- Paul Schockemöhle Logistics Gruppe, Member of the Advisory Board (since 2017)
- Deufol, Member of the Supervisory Board
- Deutsche Bank, Member of the Advisory Board
- Herrenknecht, Member of the Supervisory Board (2018-2020)

=== Non-profit organizations ===
- German Cancer Research Center (DKFZ), Member of the Advisory Council
- Federation of German Industries (BDI), Member of the Presidium (2011–2012)
- Alexander Otto Sports Foundation, Member of the Board of Trustees
- "Deutschland rundet auf", Member of the Board of Trustees
- Haus Rissen, Member of the Board of Trustees
- Stifterverband für die Deutsche Wissenschaft, Member of the Board
- Deutsche Nationalstiftung, Member of the Board of Trustees

== Personal life ==
From his first marriage Grube has a son and a daughter. On 8 August 2015 he married chef Cornelia Poletto (born 1971). Frank-Walter Steinmeier, then Germany's foreign minister, was best man.

Preceded by Hartmut Mehdorn	CEO of Deutsche Bahn AG; 2009 – 2017	Succeeded by Richard Lutz
