= Wetzlar station =

Railway station in Hesse, Germany

Wetzlar
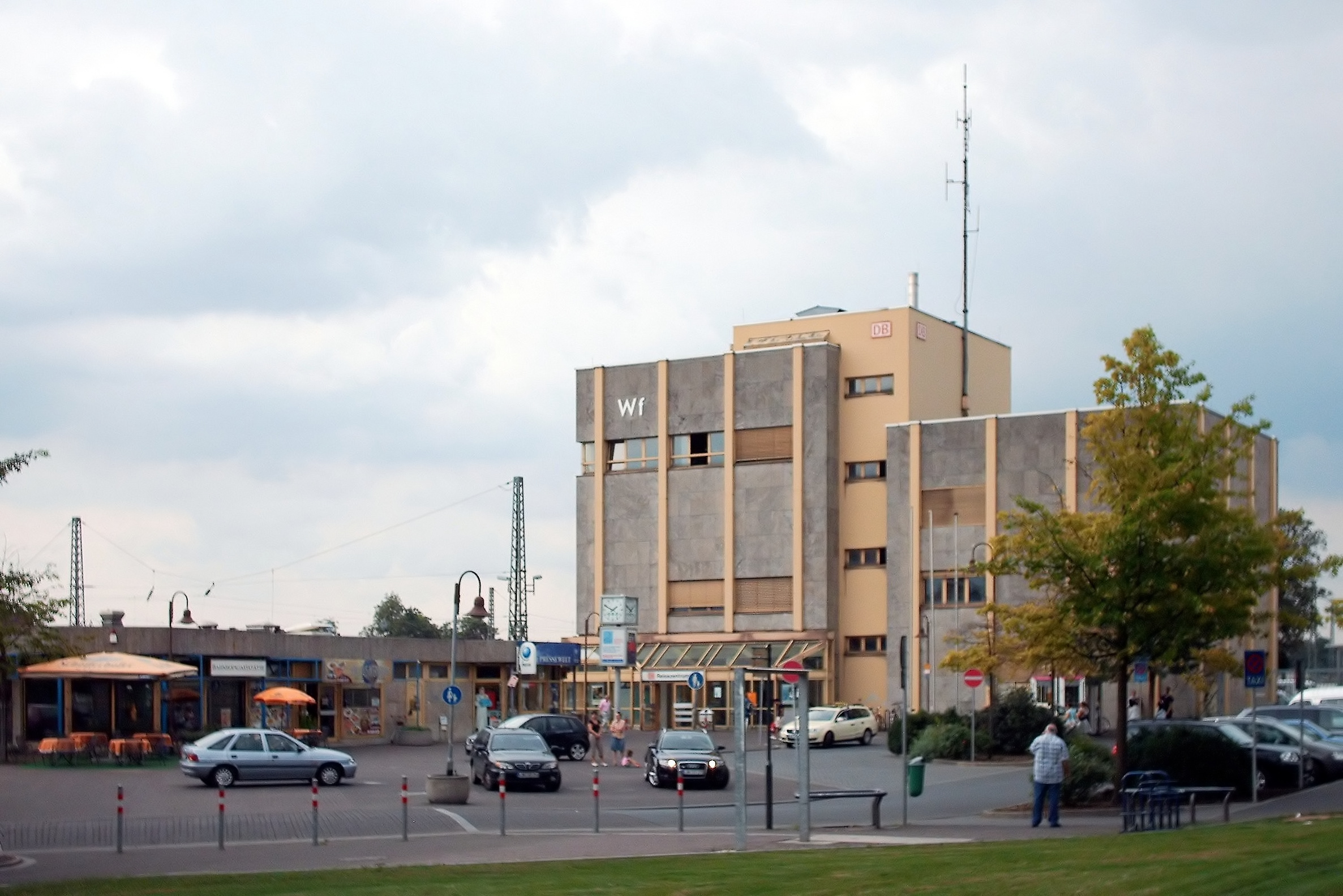
- Wetzlar station and forecourt

General information
- Location: Willy-Brandt-Platz 1, Wetzlar, Hesse; Germany
- Coordinates: 50°33′54″N 08°30′13″E
- Owner: Deutsche Bahn
- Operator: DB Station&Service
- Lines: Dill (KBS 445); Lahntal (KBS 625)
- Platforms: 5

Construction
- Accessible: Yes
- Architectural style: Modern

Other information
- Station code: 6730
- DS100 code: FWR
- IBNR: 8000383
- Category: 4
- Fare zone: : 5501
- Website: www.bahnhof.de
Services
Preceding station	DB Fernverkehr	Following station
Dillenburg towards Dortmund Hbf or Münster Hbf	IC 34	Bad Nauheim towards Frankfurt (Main) Hbf or Friedberg (Hess)
Preceding station	DB Regio Mitte	Following station
Weilburg towards Koblenz Hbf	RE 25	Gießen Terminus
Aßlar towards Dillenburg	RB 40	Dutenhofen towards Frankfurt (Main) Hbf
Preceding station	Hessische Landesbahn	Following station
Weilburg towards Giessen	RE 24	Gießen towards Weilburg
Albshausen towards Limburg (Lahn)	RB 45	Dutenhofen towards Fulda
Herborn towards Siegen Hbf	RE 99	Gießen towards Frankfurt (Main) Hbf
Location
- Location within Hesse Location within Germany Location within Europe

Wetzlar station is a through railway station in the city of Wetzlar in the German state of Hesse. The station, which serves Deutsche Bahn's Dill and Lahntal lines, constitutes (together with the adjacent bus station) Wetzlar's most important public transport node.

== History ==
The first Wetzlar station, built in 1862 in the district of Niedergirmes, was an "island station" (German: Inselbahnhof), with the main station building built between the tracks. This building still stands. The current station was originally completed in January 1917 in the Art Nouveau style, but it was demolished in 1981 and rebuilt in the Modern style.

Between 2011 and 2012 the station underwent a major reconstruction. Among other things, the platforms were replaced by new higher platforms and the platform canopies were restored. The bus station, formerly located 150 metres away, was moved to the front of the station building. The passenger tunnel under the station was extended to connect with the park-and-ride area on the north side of the station and the suburb of Niedergirmes.

== Services ==
=== Regional services ===
In the 2026 timetable, the following regional services stop at the station:

Line	Route	Frequency
RE 24	Weilburg – Wetzlar – Gießen	Every 2 Hours
RE 25	Koblenz Hbf – Niederlahnstein – Bad Ems – Limburg (Lahn) – Weilburg – Wetzlar – Gießen	Every 2 Hours
RB 40	Frankfurt – Friedberg (Hess) – Bad Nauheim – Butzbach – Gießen – Wetzlar – Herborn (Dillkr) – Dillenburg	40/80 min (Frankf.–Giessen); 60 min (Giessen–Dillenburg)
RB 45	Limburg – Weilburg – Albshausen – Wetzlar – Gießen	Hourly
RE 99	Siegen – Haiger – Dillenburg - Herborn – Wetzlar – Giessen – Friedberg – Frankfurt (Main) West	60 min (Siegen–Giessen); 120 min (Giessen–Frankfurt)

=== Long distance ===
In the 2026 timetable, the following long-distance services stop at the station:

Line	Route	Frequency
IC 34	(Münster – Hamm –) Dortmund – Siegen – Siegen – Wetzlar – Bad Nauheim – Frankfurt / Friedberg (Hess)	5 train pairs

==== Former long-distance services ====
In the 1980s and before, there were many daily express services from Wetzlar station to remote destinations such as Oberstdorf. In the early 1990s there were regular fast train connections at two-hour intervals to Frankfurt (Main) Hauptbahnhof and Münster Hauptbahnhof. From 1993, these services were replaced by Interregio line 22, Frankfurt–Münster. Once a day there was a direct Interregio connection from Wetzlar to Norddeich Mole (Norderney). The inter-regional trains on the Dill line were, however, gradually thinned out from 2001. More recently, in December 2002, the Norderney service was abolished.

From December 2009 until December 2011, Wetzlar station was connected to the long-distance network for the first time in six years. In the morning there was a EuroCity service from Wetzlar via Frankfurt, Stuttgart, and Munich to Klagenfurt. A through carriage also gave a direct connection to Ljubljana and Zagreb. The return service from Croatia, Slovenia, and Austria reached Wetzlar in the evening and continued to Siegen. This service was discontinued in December 2011.

== Platforms ==
Wetzlar station has five platform tracks, served by Regionalbahn, Regional-Express, and EuroCity trains.

Trains operate through the following platforms:

Platform	Destinations	Notes
3	RB 45 to Gießen/Fulda, RE 25 / RE 24 to Gießen	
4	RB 45 to Limburg, RE 25 to Koblenz, RE 24 to Weilburg	
5	Mittelhessen-Express RB 40 and RE 99 to Gießen/Frankfurt, IC 34 to Frankfurt	
6	Mittelhessen-Express RB 40 to/from Frankfurt / RE 24 to/from Alsfeld (some trains on either line if Wetzlar is the terminus)	also siding and overtaking track (on weekdays, an RB 40 service is scheduled to be overtaken here by the IC and RE99 Sprinter.)
7	Mittelhessen-Express RB 40 to Dillenburg, RE 99 to Siegen, IC 34 to Dortmund/Münster	

East of the passenger station in the district of Garbenheim is Wetzlar freight yard, which has been the most important facility of its kind in central Hesse since December 2006.

== Connections ==
The adjoining bus station serves regional and local bus routes. In the station forecourt there is a taxi stand and short-term parking. There are also various parking facilities nearby.
