= Selters (disambiguation) =

Selters is a mineral water brand.

Selters may also refer to:

- Selters, Rhineland-Palatinate, a town in the Westerwaldkreis, Rhineland-Palatinate, Germany
- Selters (Verbandsgemeinde), a collective municipality in Westerwaldkreis, Rhineland-Palatinate, Germany
- Selters (Taunus), a municipality near Limburg in the Limburg-Weilburg district, Hesse, Germany
- Selters (Lahn), a village near Weilburg in the Limburg-Weilburg district, Hesse, Germany
- Selters Spa, a local community and a spa in Mladenovac, a suburb of Belgrade, Serbia

== See also ==
- Selter (disambiguation)
