= Niederselters station =

Railway station in Niederselters, Germany

Niederselters
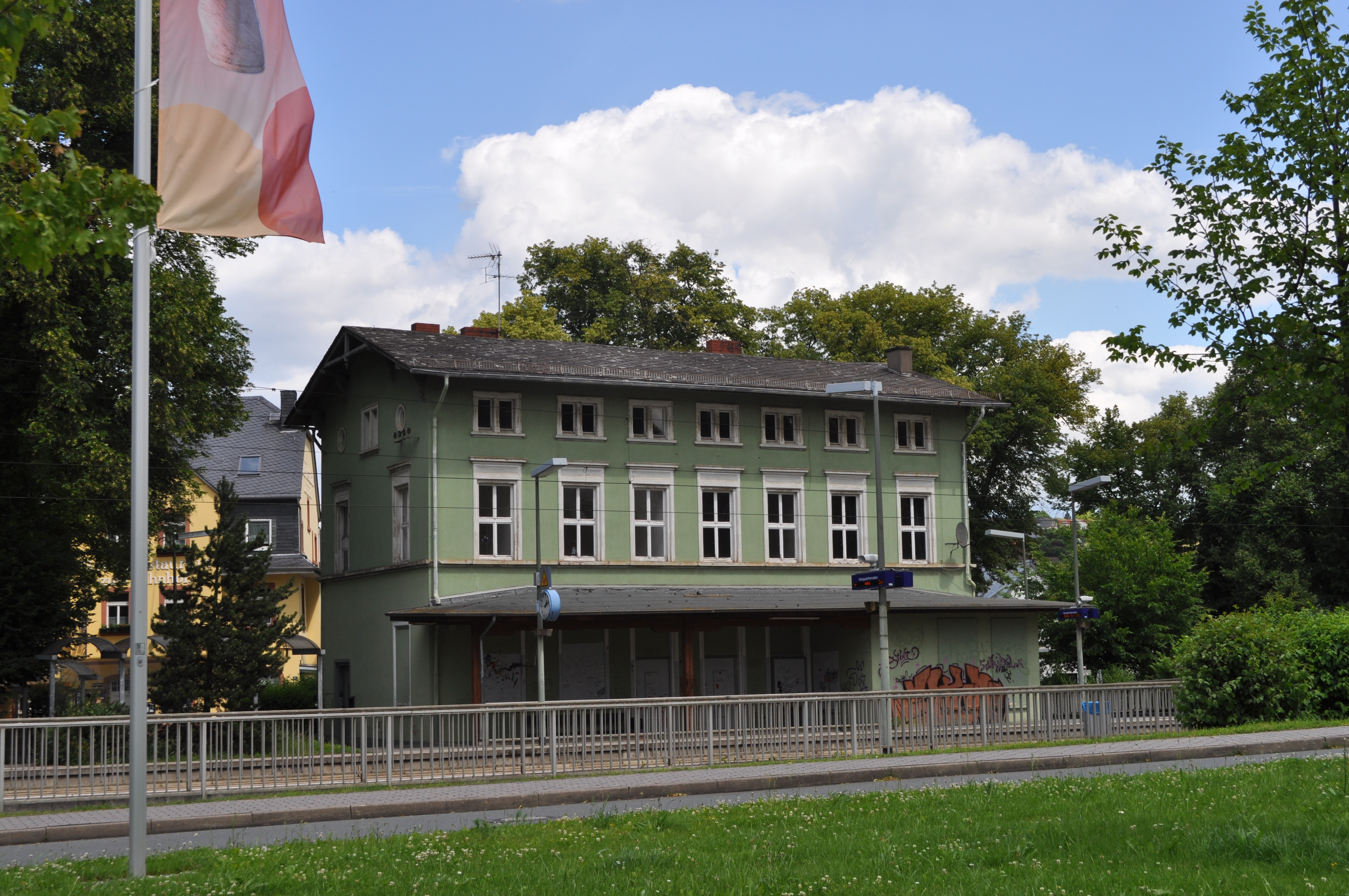
- Entrance building, trackside

General information
- Location: Bahnhofstr. 2, Niederselters, Selters, Hesse; Germany
- Coordinates: 50°19′58″N 8°13′48″E
- Line: Main-Lahn Railway
- Platforms: 2

Construction
- Accessible: Yes

Other information
- Station code: 4527
- DS100 code: FNS
- IBNR: 8004409
- Category: 6
- Fare zone: : 6135
- Website: www.bahnhof.de

History
- Opened: 1875

Services
Preceding station	DB Regio Mitte	Following station
Oberbrechen towards Limburg (Lahn)	RB 22	Bad Camberg towards Frankfurt (Main) Hbf
Preceding station	Hessische Landesbahn	Following station
Oberbrechen towards Limburg (Lahn)	RB 21	Bad Camberg towards Wiesbaden Hbf
Location
- Location within Hesse

Niederselters station is a station on the Main-Lahn Railway, which runs from Frankfurt (Main) Hauptbahnhof to Limburg (Lahn), in the Niederselters suburb of Selters in the German state of Hesse.

== History ==
The Main-Lahn Railway was opened to Niederselters in 1875 and the whole line was completed to Limburg in 1877. A second track was opened in 1913. The line was electrified in 1986. The station was adjacent to a mineral spring (from which the expression "seltzer water" is derived), which became an important freight customer.

== Location ==
The Haltepunkt (halt) is located in the south of the district of Niederselters in the municipality Selters. The halt lies between the streets Brunnenstraße (K513) in the north and Am Urseltersbrunnen in the south. The Selters water museum lies south of the station.

== Operations ==
The entrance building of Niederselters station is listed. It is of the type that was built on the Lahn Valley Railway. The building and platform canopies were extended around 1910. The goods shed that was added to the east of the station building has been demolished.

Niederselters station has two platform tracks:

- track 1 on the main platform (height: 76 cm, length: 224 m), served by RB 21/RB 22 to Limburg;
- track 2 on the island platform (height: 76 cm, length: 220 m), served by RB 21 to Niedernhausen/Wiesbaden and RB 22 to Frankfurt.

The platforms are connected by an underpass. The station has a commuter parking area and covered bicycle parking. There are small waiting shelters on the platforms, which are litten over their whole length.

== Services ==
=== Rail ===
The following services currently call at Limburg:

Line	Route	Comments
RB 21 Main-Lahn Railway, Ländches Railway	Wiesbaden Hbf – Niedernhausen (Taunus) – Niederselters – Limburg (Lahn)	Every 2 hours on Sundays and evenings
RB 22 Main-Lahn Railway	Frankfurt (Main) Hbf – Frankfurt-Höchst – Niedernhausen (Taunus) – Niederselters – Limburg (Lahn)	Hourly Hourly + additional services in the peak

=== Bus ===
Niederselters station is served by bus route 285 to Eisenbach, Münster, Haintchen, Weilrod and Oberselters and Bad Camberg.
