= Löhnberg =

- Municipality
- Flag Coat of arms

- Location of Löhnberg within Limburg-Weilburg district
- Interactive map of Löhnberg
- Location within Germany Location within Hesse
- Coordinates: 50°31′N 08°16′E
- Country: Germany
- State: Hesse
- Admin. region: Gießen
- District: Limburg-Weilburg

Government
  - Mayor (2021–27): Frank Schmidt (SPD)

Area
  - Total: 33.84 km^{2} (13.07 sq mi)
- Elevation: 145 m (476 ft)

Population (2025-12-31)
  - Total: 4,686
  - Density: 138.5/km^{2} (358.6/sq mi)
- Time zone: UTC+01:00 (CET)
  - Summer (DST): UTC+02:00 (CEST)
- Postal codes: 35792
- Dialling codes: 06471, 06477
- Vehicle registration: LM, WEL
- Website: www.gemeinde-loehnberg.de

Löhnberg (German pronunciation: [ˈløːnbɛʁk]) is a municipality north of Weilburg in Limburg-Weilburg district in Hesse, Germany.

== Geography ==
=== Location ===
Löhnberg lies between Wetzlar and the district seat of Limburg an der Lahn.

=== Neighbouring communities ===
Löhnberg borders in the north on the community of Greifenstein, in the east on the towns of Leun and Braunfels (all three in the Lahn-Dill-Kreis), in the south on the town of Weilburg, and in the west on the communities of Merenberg and Mengerskirchen (all three in Limburg-Weilburg).

=== Constituent communities ===
Löhnberg's Ortsteile are Löhnberg (administrative seat), Niedershausen, Obershausen and Selters.

== History ==
All three constituent communities had their first documentary mention in the late 13th or early 14th century, although in Selters's case it is rather unclear as the village has the same name as both Selters in Rhineland-Palatinate and Selters in the Taunus. A document from 1317, however, can unequivocally be said to refer to Selters an der Lahn, now the Löhnberg constituent community, although it seems likely that the place might have been mentioned earlier. In 1324, the Laneburg, a castle belonging to Nassau, was first mentioned. It must have been built shortly before that. At that time, Löhnberg's main centre was still called Heimau and was granted under this name town rights in 1321. However, the new town had its growth stunted because it lay so near Weilburg and also because it was pledged in 1344 to the Nassau line whose seat was there. The Laneburg had its own church by 1342 and as of 1355 a priest. In the Reformation, the community became Evangelical. In the late 16th century, the Laneburg was converted into a Renaissance palace and for a short time was a Nassau-Dillenburg residence. In 1900, the castle was gutted by fire.

The constituent community of Obershausen had its first documentary mention in 1310, and Niedershausen in 1296.

Within the framework of administrative reform in Hesse in the 1970s, the formerly autonomous communities of Löhnberg, Niedershausen, Obershausen and Selters an der Lahn, which had belonged to the old Oberlahnkreis, merged into a new collective community of Löhnberg.

== Politics ==
=== Community council ===
The municipal election held on 26 March 2006 yielded the following results:

Parties and voter communities		% 2006	seats 2006	% 2001	seats 2001
CDU	Christian Democratic Union of Germany	18.1	4	16.7	4
SPD	Social Democratic Party of Germany	45.3	11	46.6	11
FW - BfB	Freie Wähler -Bürger für Bürger-	36.6	8	36.7	8
Total		100.0	23	100.0	23
voter turnout in %		49.1		60.8	

== Twin towns – sister cities ==
Löhnberg is twinned with:

- Ostermundigen, Switzerland
- Auleben, Germany

== Sightseeing ==
=== Museums ===
- Lahneburgmuseum für Geologie und Paläontologie

=== Buildings ===
Laneburg castle ruins are in Löhnberg, dating back to the 13th Century and significant to coin collectors for the hoard of old currency discovered during restoration work in the year 2000. Löhnberg also has a Protestant castle church from 1738 and the Catholic church of Saint Hedwig.

== Economy and infrastructure ==
On the edge of Löhnberg nearest the village of Selters is the bottling plant for Selters mineral water, sourced from its well on site and sold both in Germany and abroad.

=== Transport ===
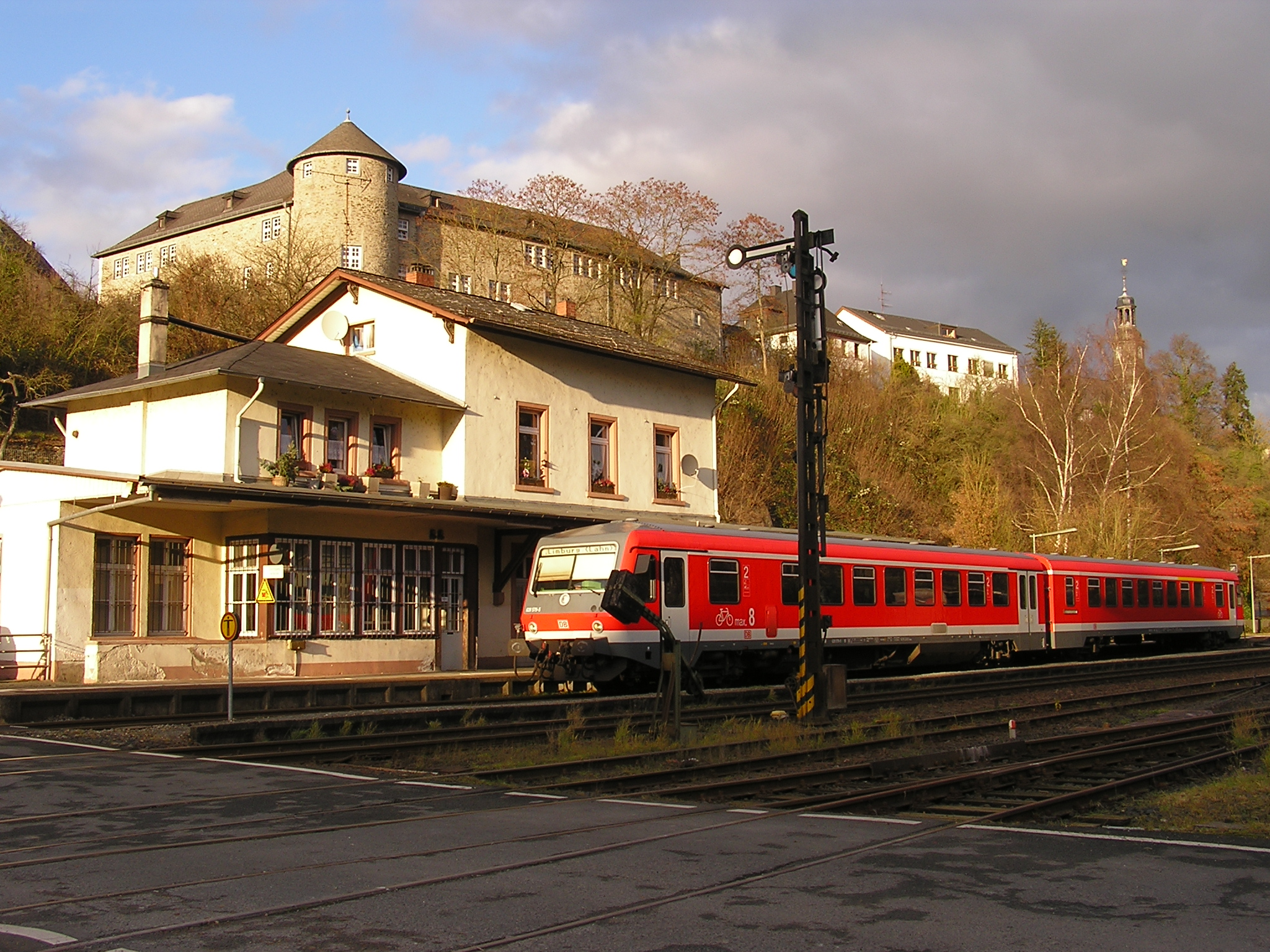
Regional railway station

Through the community runs Bundesstraße 49 (Limburg - Wetzlar).

Löhnberg has a railway station, part of the Lahntal railway.

=== Education ===
In Löhnberg, there is one primary school named Grundschule auf dem Falkenflug. The nearest secondary schools are in Weilburg.

=== Public institutions ===
- Kindergarten HABAKUK Löhnberg
- Kindergarten "Kleine Strolche" Niedershausen
- Löhnberg Volunteer Fire Brigade, founded 1901 (includes Youth Fire Brigade)
- Niedershausen Volunteer Fire Brigade, founded 1901 (includes Youth Fire Brigade)
- Obershausen Volunteer Fire Brigade, founded 1934 (includes Youth Fire Brigade)
- Selters Volunteer Fire Brigade, founded 1934

== Famous people ==
- Hermine Spies-Hardtmuth (b. 25 February 1857 in Löhnberger Hütte; d. 26 February 1893 in Wiesbaden) was a German opera singer. She was said to be one of Europe’s leading contraltos and an outstanding interpreter of works by Johannes Brahms, with whom she was friends.
- Wilhelm Kremer. He was Mayor of Löhnberg and Hessian State Chairman of the VdK (service club for the handicapped, chronically ill, elderly).
