= Niederselters =

Urban district in Hesse, Germany

Coordinates: 50°20′N 8°14′E

Niederselters is an urban district (Ortsteil) of the Selters community in Hesse, Germany. Niederselters station lies on the Main-Lahn Railway. With Oberbrechen station, it is one of two stations in Brechen. Nearby is a Cistercian nunnery Kloster Gnadenthal in 3 km.

Coat of arms of Niederselters

Flag of Niederselters

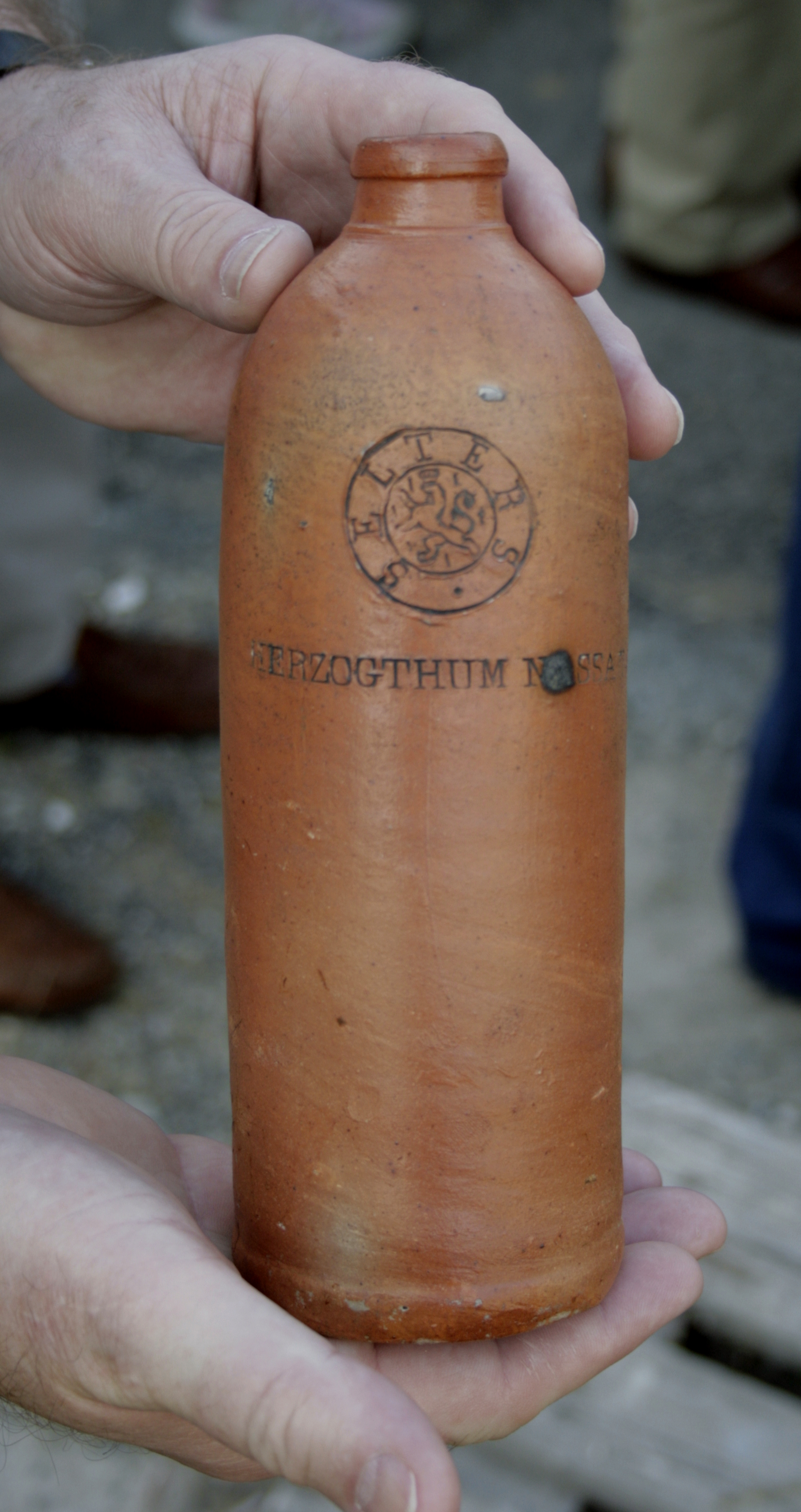
Seltzer water flask from the 19th century
