= Niederbrechen station =

Railway station in Brechen, Germany

Niederbrechen
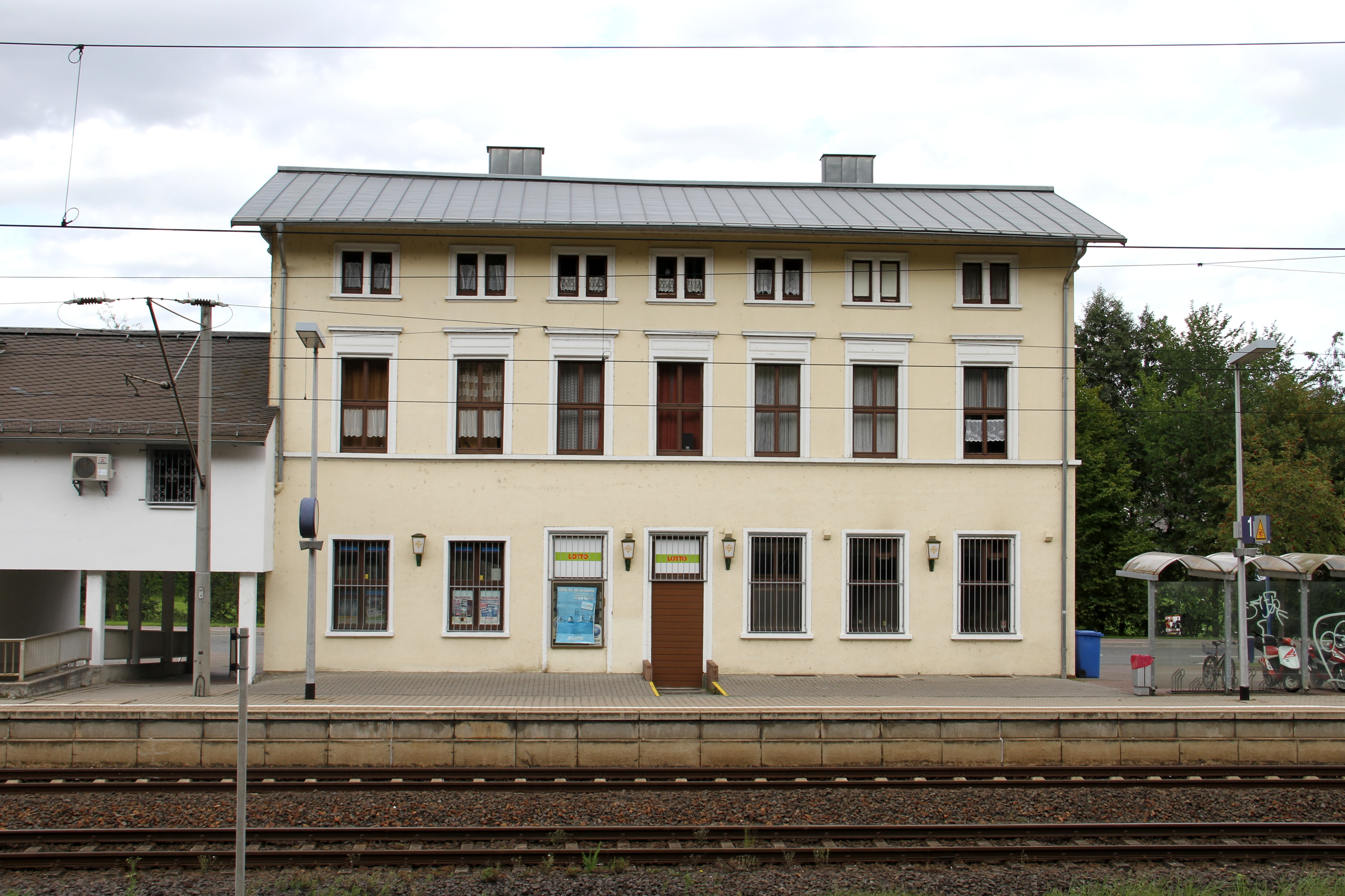

General information
- Location: Bahnhofstr. 32, Niederbrechen, Brechen, Hesse; Germany
- Coordinates: 50°21′34″N 8°09′40″E
- Owner: DB Netz
- Operator: DB Station&Service
- Line: Main-Lahn Railway (km 60.8)
- Platforms: 1 island platform 1 side platform
- Tracks: 3

Construction
- Accessible: Yes

Other information
- Station code: 4922
- DS100 code: FNCH
- IBNR: 8004364
- Category: 5
- Fare zone: : 6120
- Website: www.bahnhof.de

History
- Opened: 1 February 1875

Services
Preceding station	DB Regio Mitte	Following station
Eschhofen towards Limburg (Lahn)	RE 20	Bad Camberg towards Frankfurt (Main) Hbf
Lindenholzhausen towards Limburg (Lahn)	RB 22	Oberbrechen towards Frankfurt (Main) Hbf
Preceding station	Hessische Landesbahn	Following station
Lindenholzhausen towards Limburg (Lahn)	RB 21	Oberbrechen towards Wiesbaden Hbf
Location
- Location within Hesse

Niederbrechen station is a station on the Main-Lahn Railway, which runs from Frankfurt (Main) Hauptbahnhof to Limburg (Lahn), in the Brechen suburb of Niederbrechen in the German state of Hesse. With Oberbrechen station, it is one of two stations in Brechen. The station is in the network of the Rhein-Main-Verkehrsverbund (RMV) and is classified by Deutsche Bahn as a category 5 station and has three platform tracks.

== History ==
A Haltepunkt (halt) was built in Niederbrechen with the construction of the Main-Lahn Railway in 1875 and the entrance building was opened in 1879. The construction of a bridge for Bahnhofstraße began in 1913 and the level crossing at Jahnstraße was closed after its completion. A signal box was also opened in 1913 with the duplication of the line. An unloading track was built in 1937 for building material for the construction of the A3 and was dismantled after the completion of the highway. A goods shed, which was connected to the station was removed in 1988. A new signal box was commissioned on 26 September 1989. The old signal box of 1913 was demolished on 12 October 1989. A new pedestrian underpass was built from 1989 to 1991. The level crossing to the Flachsau fields was closed in 1992. Goods were last handled in Niederbrechen in 1993. The removal of a shunting track and a siding followed in 2005. The heritage-listed station building now houses, among other things, a restaurant and a stationery shop.

== Operations ==
Today, Niederbrechen station is the only station between Eschhofen and Idstein that still has three platform tracks.

- Track 1 on the main platform (height: 76 cm, length: 225 m): RE 20/RB 22/RB 21 to Limburg (Lahn)
- Track 2 on the island platform (height: 76 cm, length: 221 m): RE 20/RB 22 to Frankfurt (Main); RB 21 to Niedernhausen/Wiesbaden
- Track 3 on the island platform (height: 76 cm, length: 221 m): siding for special services.

== Services ==
=== Rail ===
The following services currently call at Limburg:

Line	Route	Comments
RE 20 Main-Lahn Railway	Frankfurt (Main) Hbf – Frankfurt-Höchst – Niedernhausen (Taunus) – Niederbrechen – Limburg (Lahn)	Mon-Fri only, 4 services towards Frankfurt in AM peak; 7 hourly services towards Limburg in the afternoon)
RB 21 Main-Lahn Railway, Ländches Railway	Wiesbaden Hbf – Niedernhausen (Taunus) – Niederbrechen – Limburg (Lahn)	Every 2 hours on Sundays and evenings
RB 22 Main-Lahn Railway	Frankfurt (Main) Hbf – Frankfurt-Höchst – Niedernhausen (Taunus) – Niederbrechen – Limburg (Lahn)	Hourly + additional services in the peak

=== Bus ===
At Niederbrechen station there are connections to buses towards Mensfelden, Limburg an der Lahn, Villmar and Weilburg.
