= Lindenholzhausen station =

Railway station in Lindenholzhausen, Germany

Lindenholzhausen
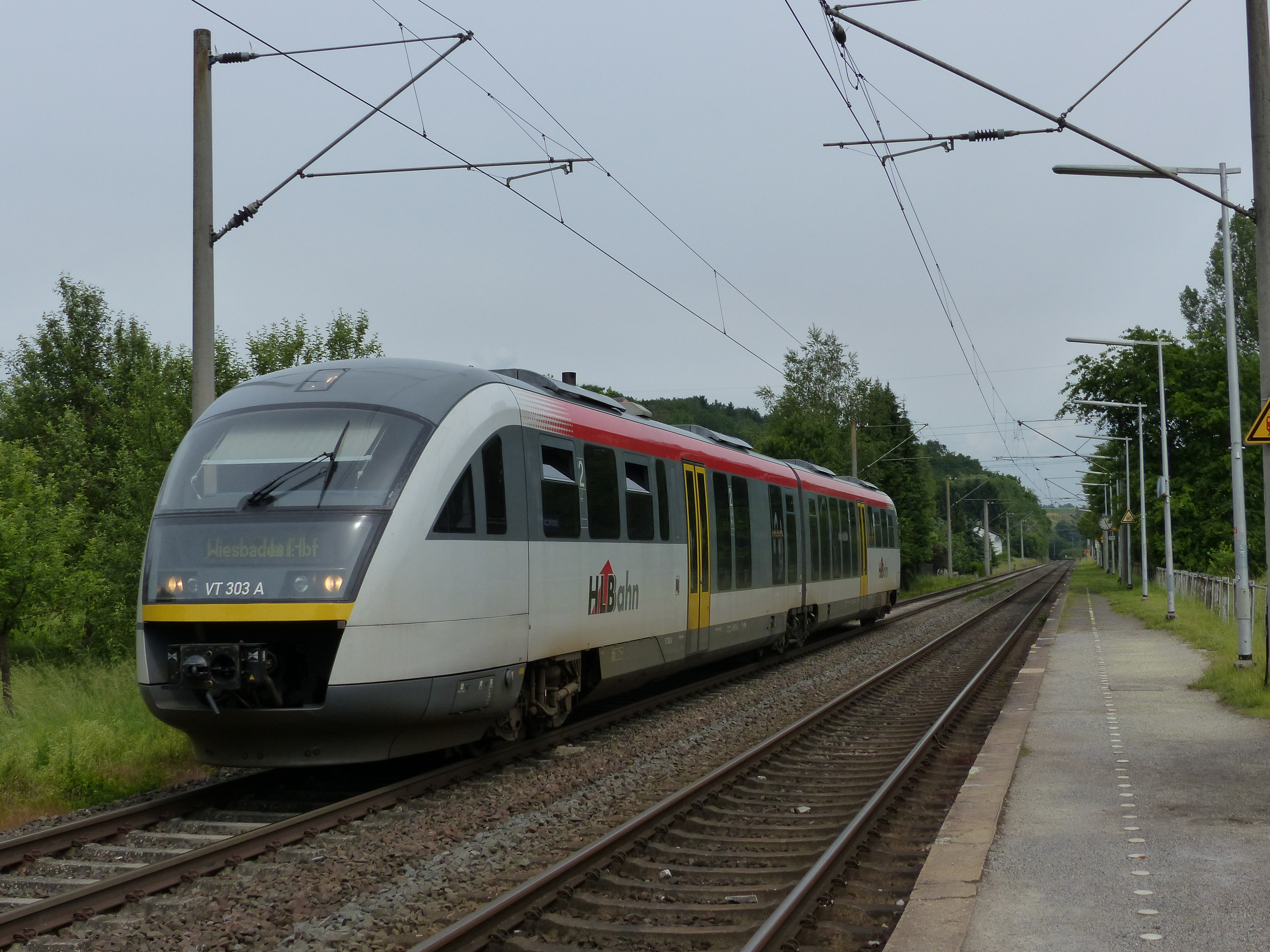

General information
- Location: Bahnhofstr. 72, Lindenholzhausen, Limburg an der Lahn, Hesse; Germany
- Coordinates: 50°22′39″N 8°08′00″E
- Line: Main-Lahn Railway
- Platforms: 2

Construction
- Accessible: Yes

Other information
- Station code: 3733
- DS100 code: FLHN
- IBNR: 8003696
- Category: 6
- Fare zone: : 6001
- Website: www.bahnhof.de

History
- Opened: 1 February 1875

Services
| Preceding station | DB Regio Mitte | Following station |
|---|---|---|
| Eschhofen towards Limburg (Lahn) | RB 22 | Niederbrechen towards Frankfurt (Main) Hbf |
| Preceding station | Hessische Landesbahn | Following station |
| Eschhofen towards Limburg (Lahn) | RB 21 | Niederbrechen towards Wiesbaden Hbf |
Location
- Location within Hesse

Lindenholzhausen station is a station on the Main-Lahn Railway, which runs from Frankfurt (Main) Hauptbahnhof to Limburg (Lahn), in the Limburg an der Lahn suburb of Lindenholzhausen in the German state of Hesse.

== History ==
The Main-Lahn Railway was opened to Lindenholzhausen in 1875 and the whole line was completed to Limburg in 1877. The initially single-track Haltepunkt (halt) of Lindenholzhausen was opened on 1 February 1875 together with the Eschhofen–Niederselters section. The duplication of the line began in 1911 and it was completed in 1913. As a result, there were two directional platform tracks in Lindenholzhausen. The Niedernhausen–Limburg section, including Lindenholzhausen station, was electrified in 1986.

== Infrastructure ==
=== Platforms and tracks ===
Lindenholzhausen station has two platform tracks:

- track 1 on the main platform (height: 34 cm, length: 301 m), served by RB 21/RB 22 to Limburg;
- track 2 on the island platform (height: 34 cm, length: 235 m), served by RB 21 to Niedernhausen/Wiesbaden and RB 22 to Frankfurt.

The platforms are separated by a level crossing, which provides the only connection between them. Track 2 lies south of the level crossing and track 1 north of the level crossing.

== Services ==
=== Rail ===
The following services currently call at Limburg:

| Line | Route | Comments |
|---|---|---|
| RB 21 Main-Lahn Railway, Ländches Railway | Wiesbaden Hbf – Niedernhausen (Taunus) – Lindenholzhausen – Limburg (Lahn) | Every 2 hours on Sundays and evenings |
| RB 22 Main-Lahn Railway | Frankfurt (Main) Hbf – Frankfurt-Höchst – Niedernhausen (Taunus) – Lindenholzhausen – Limburg (Lahn) | Hourly Hourly + additional services in the peak |

=== Lindenholzhausen crossover on Cologne–Frankfurt high-speed railway ===
In addition to Lindenholzhausen station, there is a crossover (Überleitstelle) on the nearby Cologne–Frankfurt high-speed railway that is named after Lindenholzhausen. The crossover lies south of Limburg Süd station.
