= Eschhofen station =

Railway station in Hesse, Germany

Eschhofen
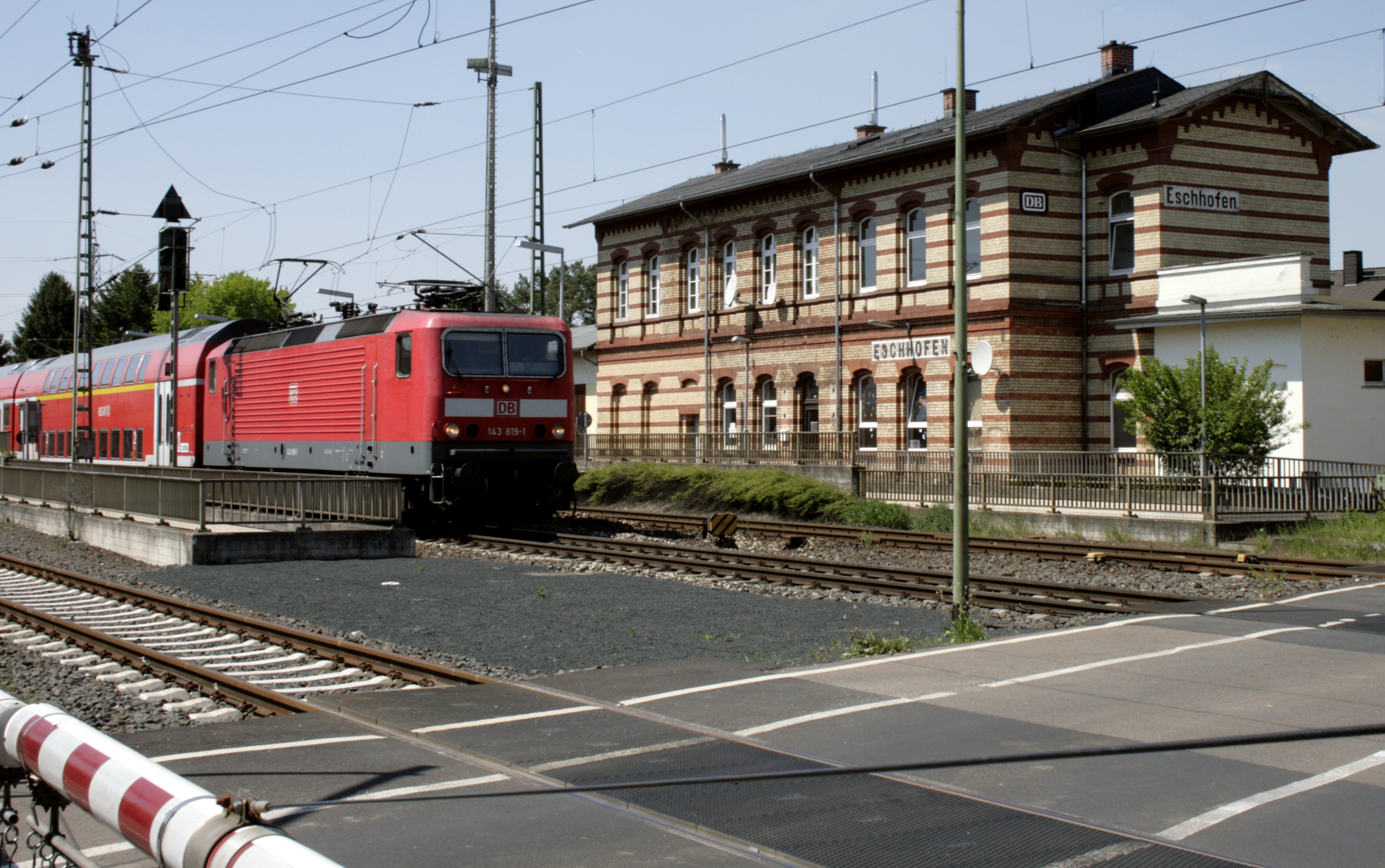

General information
- Location: Bahnhofstr. 38, Limburg an der Lahn, Hesse; Germany
- Coordinates: 50°23′37″N 8°06′18″E
- Lines: Main-Lahn Railway (66.5 km) (KBS 627); Lahn Valley Railway (48.9 km) (KBS 625)
- Platforms: 3

Construction
- Accessible: Yes

Other information
- Station code: 1678
- DS100 code: FEN
- IBNR: 8001883
- Category: 5
- Fare zone: : 6001
- Website: www.bahnhof.de

History
- Opened: 10 January 1863

Services
Preceding station	DB Regio Mitte	Following station
Limburg (Lahn) Terminus	RE 20	Niederbrechen towards Frankfurt (Main) Hbf
Limburg (Lahn) Terminus	RB 22	Lindenholzhausen towards Frankfurt (Main) Hbf
Preceding station	Hessische Landesbahn	Following station
Limburg (Lahn) Terminus	RB 21	Lindenholzhausen towards Wiesbaden Hbf
Limburg (Lahn) Terminus	RB 45	Kerkerbach towards Fulda
Location

Eschhofen station lies on the Lahn Valley Railway (German: Lahntalbahn) in the town of Limburg an der Lahn in the German state of Hesse. In addition, just east of the station, the Main-Lahn Railway (Main-Lahn-Bahn) branches off to Frankfurt. The station was opened in 1863. It is classified by Deutsche Bahn as a category 5 station.

== History ==
Eschhofen station was opened on 10 January 1863 with the inauguration of the Lahn Valley Railway. The first section of the Main-Lahn Railway was opened to traffic between Eschhofen and Niederselters on 1 February 1875 and the rest of the line was completed to Frankfurt on 15 October 1877. The current station building was probably built in 1896 and is classified as a monument under the Hessian Heritage Act.

== Infrastructure ==
The station is only served by regional services. It has three platform tracks. Track 1 (the “home” platform, next to the station building) is used for trains running towards Limburg and Koblenz. Track 2 and track 3 are adjacent to a central platform and track 2 is served by all trains towards Gießen and Niedernhausen / Wiesbaden / Frankfurt. Track 3 is used only as a passing track and is not used regularly. Next to track 3, there are two tracks without platforms, but they are no longer used. The station has a park-and-ride and a bike-and-ride facility.

== Services ==
Eschhofen station is served by all trains towards Limburg/Koblenz and Gießen/Wiesbaden/Frankfurt. With the exception of the RB 21 and RB 45 services, which are operated by Hessische Landesbahn, all trains are operated by Deutsche Bahn. Trains to Koblenz (Regional-Express 25) run every two hours on the Gießen–Limburg–Koblenz route. There is also an hourly Regionalbahn service on the Gießen–Wetzlar–Weilburg–Limburg route, which since the 2011/2012 timetable change has been operated by Hessische Landesbahn. On the Main-Lahn Railway services run as far as Niedernhausen during the peak hour about every quarter of an hour, with a Regional-Express service and a Stadt-Express to Frankfurt, and a Regionalbahn service to Wiesbaden.
