= Velter =

Velter is a surname. Notable people with the surname include:

- André Velter (born 1945), French poet
- Michael Velter (born 1980), Belgian triple jumper
- Robert Velter (1909–1991), French cartoonist

== See also ==
- Selter (disambiguation)
- Vetter
