= Berger Kirche =

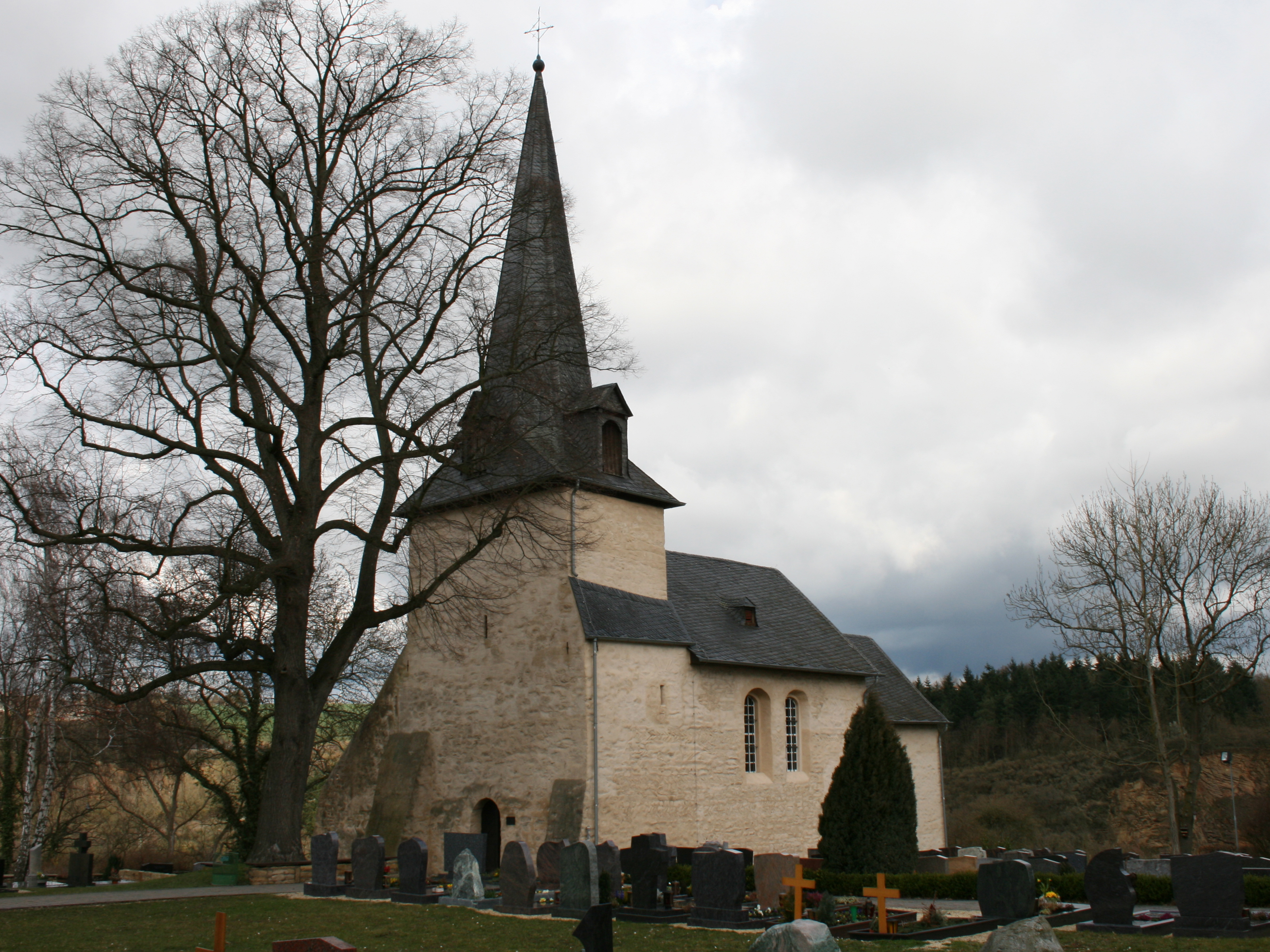
- The church and the graveyard

- 50°21′45″N 8°08′50″E
- Location: Brechen, Germany
- Denomination: Catholic

History
- Status: Cemetery chapel
- Dedication: St. George

Architecture
- Functional status: Concert venue
- Style: Romanesque
- Completed: before 910

Administration
- Diocese: Diocese of Limburg

Berger Kirche is the common name of a church building close to Werschau, part of Brechen in Hesse, Germany. It was first mentioned in 910 and is one of the oldest buildings in the region. It was dedicated to St. George, and remained when the village of Bergen was abandoned.

The Berger Kirche is located on top of a rock west of Niederbrechen and northwest of Werschau, close to the Bundesstraße 8, formerly the Via publica which connected Cologne and Frankfurt. It serves the cemetery of Werschau which surrounds it, and is a venue for services and concerts.

== History ==
The first certain document dates from 910, when Louis the Child donated the church to Count Konrad Kurzbold, together with the court in Oberbrechen, to found a Georgsstift. A later document from 1652 mentions the church dating from 752, but its authenticity is doubted. While the church was built, probably right after the donation, another building was begun which later developed to the Limburg Cathedral. The Berger Kirche was originally dedicated to St. Martin. In 1232, when it was more closely connected to the Georgsstift, the patronage was changed to St. George.

Regular processions to the church were mentioned in 1586, from surrounding villages including Villmar on the Lahn and Panrod, supporting the view that the church was a Mutterkirche (mother church) for a region. It was an early Christian centre in the area, along with the St. Blasius, Dornburg, St. Severus and St. Lubentius, Dietkirchen. The church served as a parish church until 1571, then as a Friedhofskirche (cemetery church) for the surrounding which belongs to Werschau.

From 1933, processions were held on horses at Pentecost (Pfingstritt), with several hundred horses. The Nazis stopped them, but from 1946 to 1968 they were held again. In 1981 a "Freundeskreis Berger Kirche" was founded to take care of the church and organize events.

The church is a listed monument. It serves as a chapel for the cemetery of Werschau which surrounds it, and as a venue for services and concerts. It is a Geöffnete Kirche (open church), opened at regular hours. The Freundeskreis began the 2016/17 season of concerts with a performance of Rossini's Petite messe solennelle by the Kammerchor Ehrenbach.

== Architecture ==
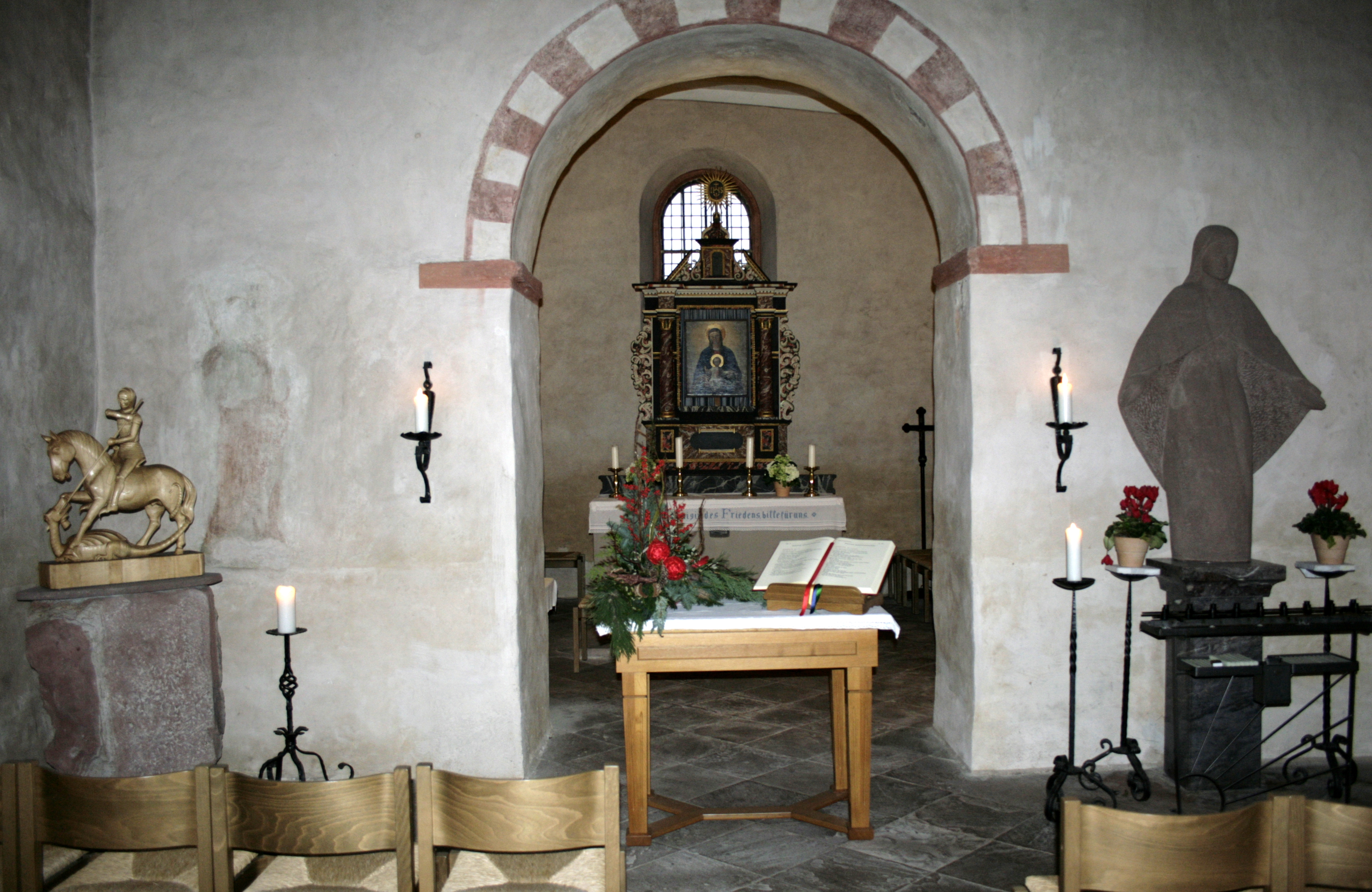
The choir with the copy of a statue of St. George, remnants of medieval frescos, and a modern statue of Mary.

The Berger Kirche was begun as a hall church in Romanesque style. It was later expanded by a nave to the north, and by a narrow rectangular choir.

In 1967, medieval frescos were discovered, showing the patron saint and a crucifixion scene.

== Literature ==
- Hellmuth Gensicke: Aus der Geschichte von Werschau. 44 Seiten, 1985.
- Heinrich Eppstein: Die Berger Kirche. Ein Denkmal und Heiligtum im Nassauer Land. 2008.
