= Selters (Lahn) =

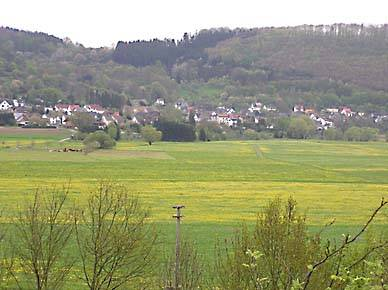
- Field in Selters

- Location within Germany Location within Hesse
- Coordinates: 50°31′01″N 08°17′19″E
- Country: Germany
- State: Hesse
- District: Limburg-Weilburg
- Municipality: Löhnberg
- First mentioned: 1317

Population (2023)
  - Total: 319
- Postal code: 35792
- Area code: 06471

Selters (German pronunciation: [ˈzɛltɐs]) is a village in the district Limburg-Weilburg, Hesse, Germany. It is situated at the Taunus side of the river Lahn and belongs to the municipality Löhnberg. The village has a total population of 319.

The village is famous for its natural springs of carbonated mineral water, which is sold as Selters water.

== Location ==
Löhnberg-Selters lies near Wiesbaden in direction to the Taunus mountains, near the river Lahn, and between Wetzlar and Limburg in the state of Hesse.

== History and etymology ==
The ancient Romans (who occupied Germany between 50 B.C. and 475 AD) called the places where water emerged from underground Aqua Saltare (Latin for 'dancing water'). This name was applied to the town and then borrowed into German as Selters. Franks formally settled in the area as early as 500 AD, and was mentioned by writing for the first time in 1317 as Selters an der Lahn.

The Laneberg castle, built in the capital of the Löhnberg region, was constructed by John, Count of Nassau-Dillenburg between 1321 and 1324. The castle ruins are unusual in surviving, as most buildings burned down in a fire in 1538.

Selters later received a parish in 1694, led by pastor Johann Bosen. Being made out of wood, the church was later damaged during another fire in 1706, leading pastor J. G. Haybach to build a new church, which began construction in 1731 by carpenter J. A. Klöckner.

In 1815, the town straddled the border of the Duchy of Nassau and the Kingdom of Prussia. The town was part of the Wetzlar district in Prussia and bordered Braunfels in the neighboring Rhine Province until 1932, when borders in Germany were redrawn.

In 1974, municipal reform in Hesse required that Selters join the Löhnberg municipality.

For the most part, the population of Selters has stagnated throughout early modern history. In 1824, Selters an der Lahn had a population of 136 people, and grew to 235 inhabitants by 1880. The population has only grown by ~35% in the past 140 years.

The name Selters is the etymology for the modern word Seltzer.

=== Administrative timeline ===
Sources:

- Before 1806: Holy Roman Empire, Principality of Nassau-Weilburg, Amt Weilburg
- 1806-1849: Duchy of Nassau, Amt Weilburg
- 1849-1854: German Confederation, Duchy of Nassau, Hadamar District Office
- 1854-1867: German Confederation, Duchy of Nassau Amt Weilburg
- 1867-1871: North German Confederation, Kingdom of Prussia, Hesse-Nassau, Wiesbaden, Oberlahn district
- 1871-1918: German Empire, Kingdom of Prussia, Province of Hesse-Nassau, Wiesbaden, Oberlahn district
- 1918-1944: German Empire, Free State of Prussia, Province of Hesse-Nassau, Wiesbaden, Oberlahn district
- 1944-1945: German Empire, Free State of Prussia, Province of Nassau, Oberlahn district
- 1945-1946: American occupation zone, Greater Hesse, Wiesbaden administrative district, Oberlahn district
- 1946-1949: American occupation zone, Hesse, Wiesbaden administrative district, Oberlahn district
- 1949-1968: Federal Republic of Germany, Hesse, Wiesbaden, Oberlahn district
- 1968-1974: Federal Republic of Germany, Hesse, Darmstadt, Oberlahn district
- 1974-1981: Federal Republic of Germany, Hesse, Darmstadt, Limburg-Weilburg, Löhnberg municipality
- 1981–present: Federal Republic of Germany, Hesse, Giessen, Limburg-Weilburg, Löhnberg municipality

== Culture ==
Selters is under the jurisdiction of the Limburg-Weilburg fire department, with a local branch in Löhnberg.

The village celebrates its local kermis in August. The local parish has a congregation of 187 people (60% of the total population). It also celebrates an annual Traditionelles Kartoffelfest (Potato festival) in November with various local foods and cuisines available.

== Sources ==
- Ina-Maria Greverus: Das hessische Dorf. Insel Verlag, Frankfurt am Main 1982, ISBN 3-458-04782-0
