= Oberbrechen station =

Railway station in Hesse, Germany

Oberbrechen
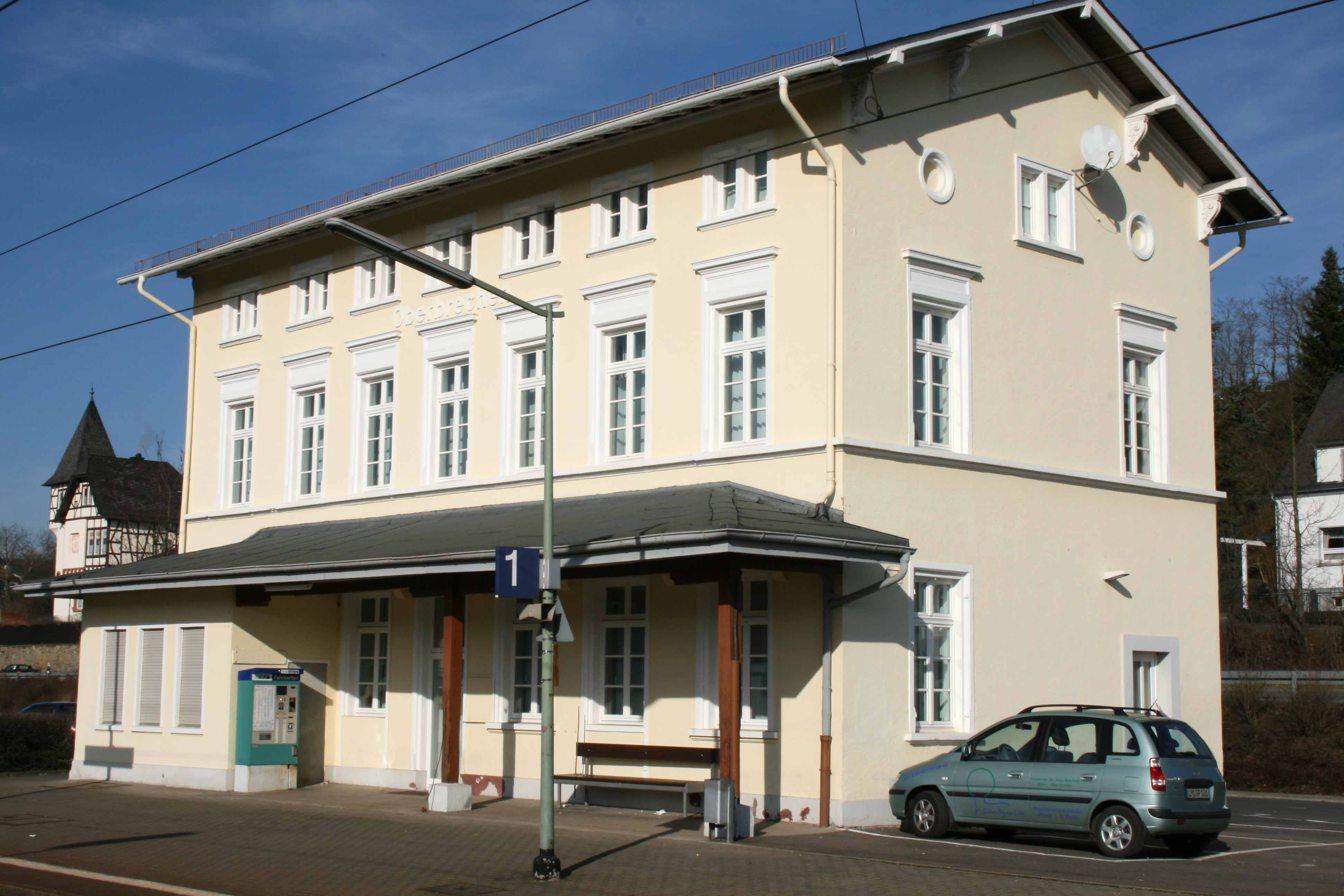

General information
- Location: Frankfurter Str. 2, Oberbrechen, Brechen, Hesse; Germany
- Coordinates: 50°21′17″N 8°11′17″E
- Line: Main-Lahn Railway (km 58.3)
- Platforms: 2

Construction
- Accessible: Platform 1 only

Other information
- Station code: 4627
- DS100 code: FOB
- IBNR: 8004518
- Category: 6
- Fare zone: : 6120
- Website: www.bahnhof.de

History
- Opened: 1875

Services
Preceding station	DB Regio Mitte	Following station
Niederbrechen towards Limburg (Lahn)	RB 22	Niederselters towards Frankfurt (Main) Hbf
Preceding station	Hessische Landesbahn	Following station
Niederbrechen towards Limburg (Lahn)	RB 21	Niederselters towards Wiesbaden Hbf
Location
- Location within Hesse

Oberbrechen station is a station on the Main-Lahn Railway, which runs from Frankfurt (Main) Hauptbahnhof to Limburg (Lahn), in the Brechen suburb of Niederbrechen in the German state of Hesse. With Niederbrechen station, it is one of two stations in Brechen. The station is in the network of the Rhein-Main-Verkehrsverbund (RMV) and is classified by Deutsche Bahn as a category 6 station and has two platform tracks.

== History ==
A Haltepunkt (halt) was built in Oberbrechen with the construction of the Main-Lahn Railway in 1875. The entrance building was opened in 1879, which was built according to the same plan as the stations in Niederbrechen, Niederselters and Bad Camberg. The entrance building is a listed building. A second platform track was built in 1913.

== Operations ==
Oberbrechen station has two platform tracks, each with an outside platform. Except for the Regional-Express trains on the RE 20 line, all trains on the Main-Lahn Railway stop here.

- Track 1 on the main platform (height: 34 cm, length: 227 m): RB 21/RB 22 to Limburg
- Track 2 on the island platform (height: 76 cm, length: 212 m): RB 21 to Niedernhausen/Wiesbaden and RB 22 to Frankfurt

== Services ==
=== Rail ===
The following services currently call at Limburg:

Line	Route	Comments
RB 21 Main-Lahn Railway, Ländches Railway	Wiesbaden Hbf – Niedernhausen (Taunus) – Oberbrechen – Limburg (Lahn)	Every 2 hours on Sundays and evenings
RB 22 Main-Lahn Railway	Frankfurt (Main) Hbf – Frankfurt-Höchst – Niedernhausen (Taunus) – Oberbrechen – Limburg (Lahn)	Hourly + additional services in the peak

=== Bus ===
At Oberbrechen station there is a connection to the hourly LM-51 bus service towards Weilburg via Weyer, Münster and Weinbach. Route 285 goes to Limburg three times a day.
