= Limburg-Weilburg =

Coordinates: 50°25′N 8°10′E

- District
- Flag Coat of arms
- Country: Germany
- State: Hesse
- Adm. region: Gießen
- Capital: Limburg (Lahn)

Government
  - District admin.: Michael Köberle (CDU)

Area
  - Total: 738.44 km^{2} (285.11 sq mi)

Population (31 December 2024)
  - Total: 173,830
  - Density: 235.40/km^{2} (609.69/sq mi)
- Time zone: UTC+01:00 (CET)
  - Summer (DST): UTC+02:00 (CEST)
- Vehicle registration: LM
- Website: www.landkreis-limburg-weilburg.de

Limburg-Weilburg is a Kreis (district) in the west of Hesse, Germany. Neighboring districts are Lahn-Dill, Hochtaunuskreis, Rheingau-Taunus, Rhein-Lahn, Westerwaldkreis.

== History ==
- 1867 the Oberlahnkreis, capital Weilburg was created
- 1886 the district Limburg an der Lahn, capital Limburg created.
- 1974 both districts were merged due to the district reorganization in Hesse.

== Geography ==
The district is located between the two mountain areas Westerwald and Taunus. The main river is the Lahn, a tributary of the Rhine.

== Coat of arms ==
The coat of arms consists of the main symbols of the two precursor districts. The cross from the district Limburg, symbolizing both Saint George the patron of the cathedral in Limburg, as well as the bishops of Trier who acquired the Limburg area in the 14th century. The chequered bar inside the cross derives from the Counts of Limburg of the 15th century. The lion in the inescutcheon, which was one of the symbols in the coat of arms of the Oberlahn district, is the lion of Nassau, as the area belonged to the Duchy of Nassau.

== Towns and municipalities ==
Clickable map of towns and municipalities in the district

Towns
1. Bad Camberg
2. Hadamar
3. Limburg an der Lahn
4. Runkel
5. Weilburg
Municipalities
1. Beselich
2. Brechen
3. Dornburg
4. Elbtal
5. Elz
6. Hünfelden
7. Löhnberg

8. Mengerskirchen
9. Merenberg
10. Selters
11. Villmar
12. Waldbrunn
13. Weilmünster
14. Weinbach
