= Selter =

Selter may refer to:

- Selter (hills), a ridge of Lower Saxony, Germany

== People with the surname ==
- Jen Selter (born 1993), American model
- Karl Selter (1898–1958), Estonian politician

== See also ==
- Selters (disambiguation)
