= Selters =

German brand of natural mineral water

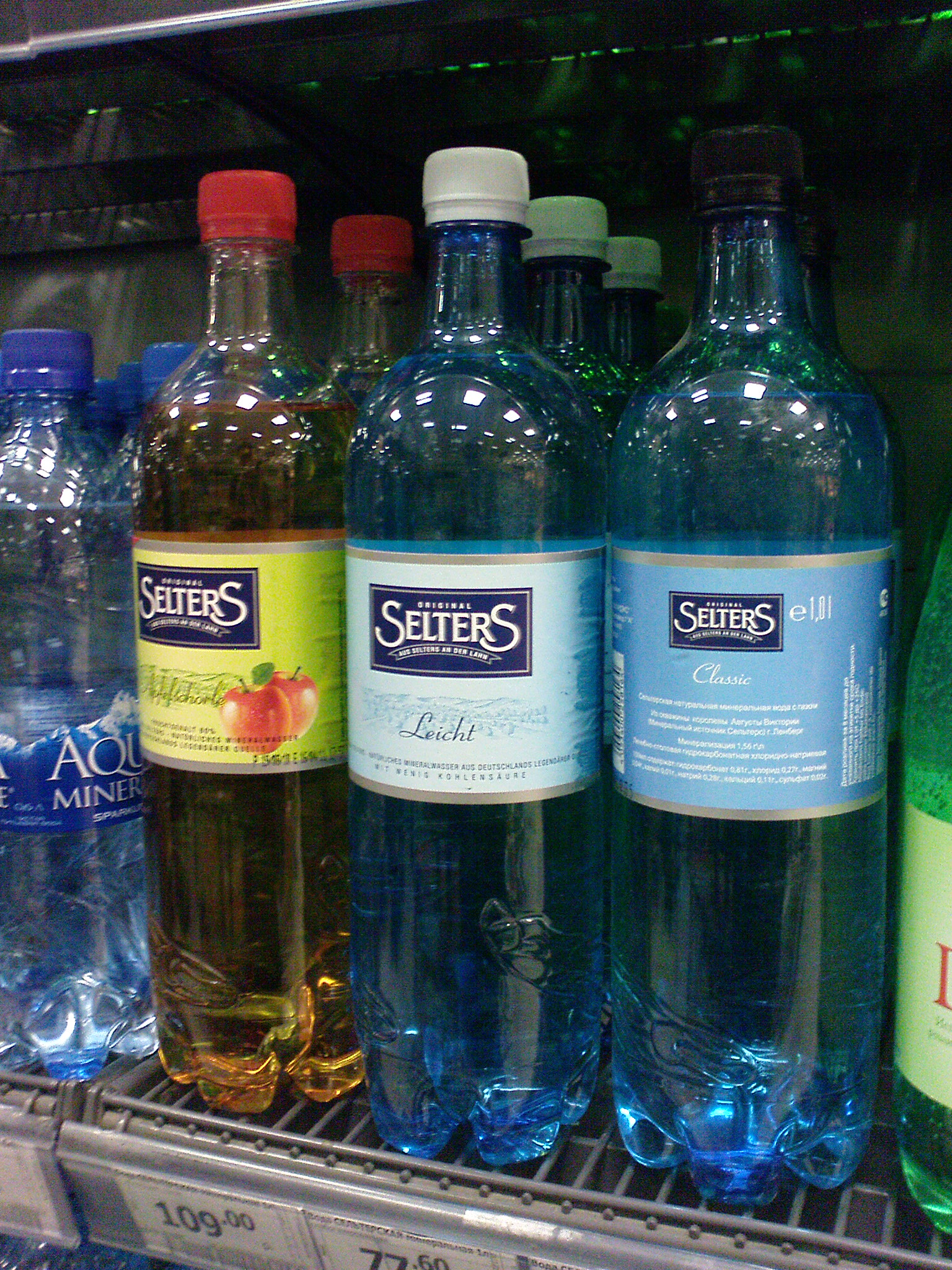
Multiple versions are sold.

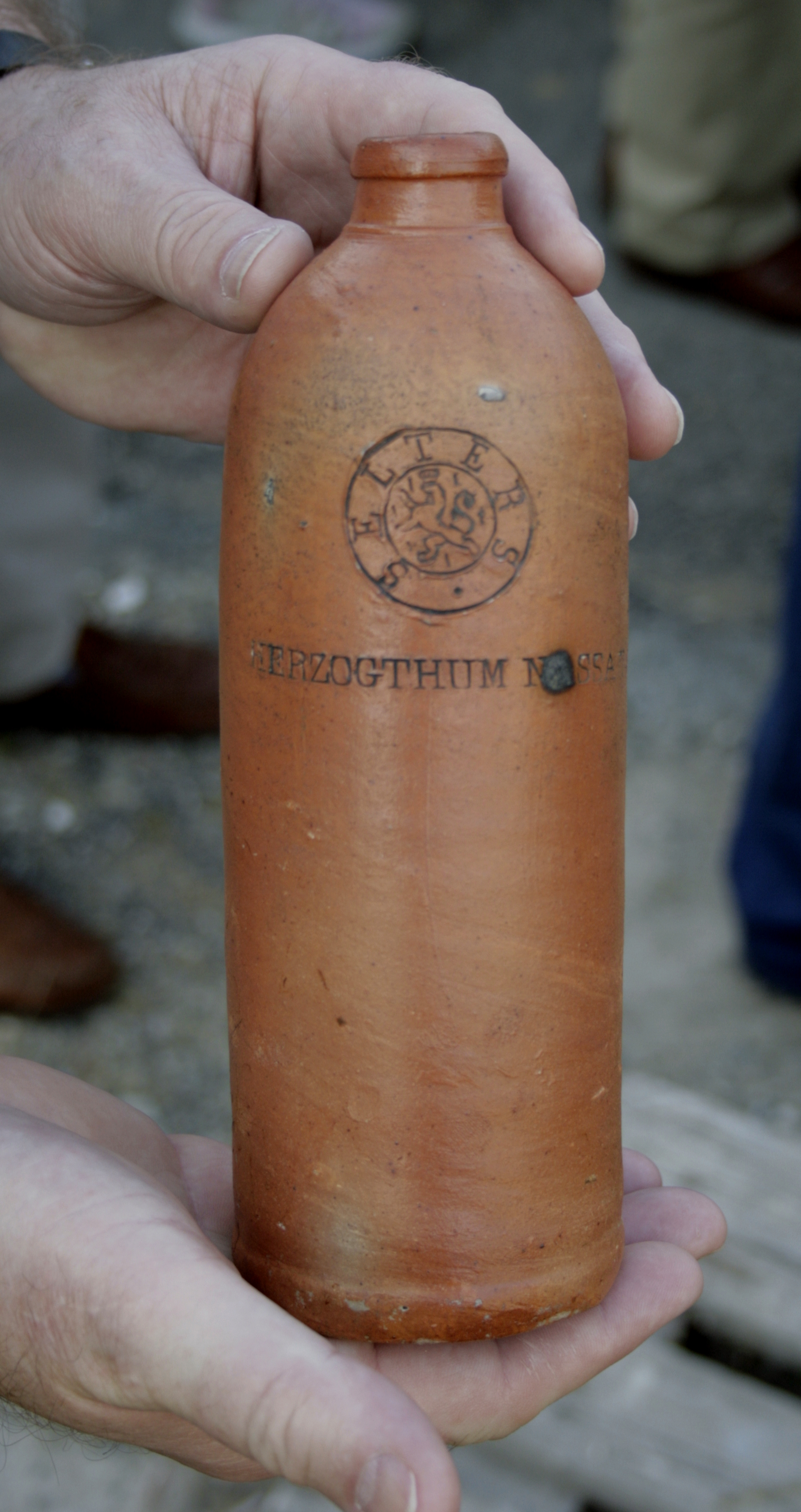
A selters bottle from Niederselters from the 19th century

Selters (German pronunciation: [ˈzɛltɐs]) is a German brand of natural mineral water sourced from wells in the area of Selters in Hesse, at the Taunus mountains. The water has been known since the Bronze Age and famous as a natural soda water because of its high concentration of sodium bicarbonate, "soda". The Selters water also contains raised levels of calcium, chloride, magnesium, sulfate and potassium ions. The water is naturally carbonated, over 250 mg/L, but sold in both sparkling and still versions.

The name and the water of Selters are the prototype of seltzer, a generic term for soda water in the United States.

== History ==
The Romans used the wells and may have given the origin of the current name Selters, either from Latin: aqua saltare (water jump) or Latin: saltrissa (salt rising), but both possibilities present linguistic uncertainties. The same name is also used in some other places in Germany with mineral wells. The wells are mentioned already in 772 in documents at the nearby monasteries in Fulda and Lorsch. In the 16th century under the rule of Johann von der Leyen, the water from the wells gained international fame.

Selters has been popular as a spa resort, and the water has been used for health effects, as well as for its taste. The water has been exported in large quantities for many centuries; in 1787 J. F. Westrumb reported that over a million Selters bottles were exported all around the world. The Selters bottle was common during the 17th to 19th centuries, made of stoneware, not to confuse with the modern "seltzer bottle" i.e. a soda siphon.

Artificial "selters waters" with added minerals have been created to make competition, thus helping to establish the fame of the original water as an international reference of soda water, e.g. by Torbern Bergman, who made thorough analyses of mineral waters and in 1775 presented how to make carbonated water to mimic genuine mineral waters.

The production at the famous main well in Niederselters was terminated in 1999, but production continues at a well in the nearby (25 km away) village of Selters-Löhnberg, in commercial use for almost 200 years, as well as at the competing one in Oberselters. There is a Selters water museum in Niederselters.

The words "Selters", "Selterwasser" or "Selter" have become synonyms for all kinds and brands of mineral water primarily in north and eastern Germany.

== See also ==
- Mineral water
- Carbonated water
