= Selters (Taunus) =

- Municipality
- Flag Coat of arms

- Location of Selters (Taunus) within Limburg-Weilburg district
- Interactive map of Selters (Taunus)
- Location within Germany Location within Hesse
- Coordinates: 50°21′N 08°16′E
- Country: Germany
- State: Hesse
- Admin. region: Gießen
- District: Limburg-Weilburg

Government
  - Mayor (2022–28): Jan Pieter Subat (Ind.)

Area
  - Total: 40.47 km^{2} (15.63 sq mi)
- Elevation: 199 m (653 ft)

Population (2025-12-31)
  - Total: 8,111
  - Density: 200.4/km^{2} (519.1/sq mi)
- Time zone: UTC+01:00 (CET)
  - Summer (DST): UTC+02:00 (CEST)
- Postal codes: 65618
- Dialling codes: 06483, 06475 (Haintchen)
- Vehicle registration: LM, WEL
- Website: www.selters-taunus.de

Selters (Taunus) (German pronunciation: [ˈzɛltɐs]) is a municipality with 8,000 inhabitants north of Bad Camberg in Limburg-Weilburg district in Hesse, Germany.

== Geography ==
=== Location ===
The greater part of the Selters municipal area with the centres of Niederselters, Eisenbach, Münster and Haintchen lies in the area of the Eastern Hintertaunus north of the Taunus' main ridge, at elevations from 170 to 500 m. In terms of natural environments, the main centre, Niederselters, also belongs to the southeastern part of the Limburg Basin. giving it a connection to the valley landscape of the Lahn. The fracture zone opening here into the basin from the south, the Idsteiner Senke (hollow), is locally known along the Emsbach, which empties into the Lahn, by the name Goldener Grund (“Golden Ground”), a reference to the favourable climate and fruitful soil (loess). The northern part of the community around Münster belongs geologically to the Lahn Basin, which is known for its mineral wealth from the Middle Devonian. Of special importance here was iron ore mining. The nearest towns are Bad Camberg (5 km to the south) and Limburg (15 km to the northwest).

=== Neighbouring communities ===
Selters borders in the north on the communities of Villmar and Weilmünster (both in Limburg-Weilburg), in the east on the community of Weilrod (Hochtaunuskreis), in the south on the town of Bad Camberg, in the southwest on the community of Hünfelden, and in the west on the community of Brechen (all three in Limburg-Weilburg).

=== Constituent communities ===
Selters has four Ortsteile, given here with their population figures:

Ortsteil	1910	2002	Notes
Niederselters	1,455	3,222	Community’s administrative seat, origin of Selterswasser, stop on the Main-Lahn-Bahn (railway).
Eisenbach	1,208	3,258	Spa
Münster	977	1,161	
Haintchen	567	982	Recreation resort, Baroque church

=== Gallery ===
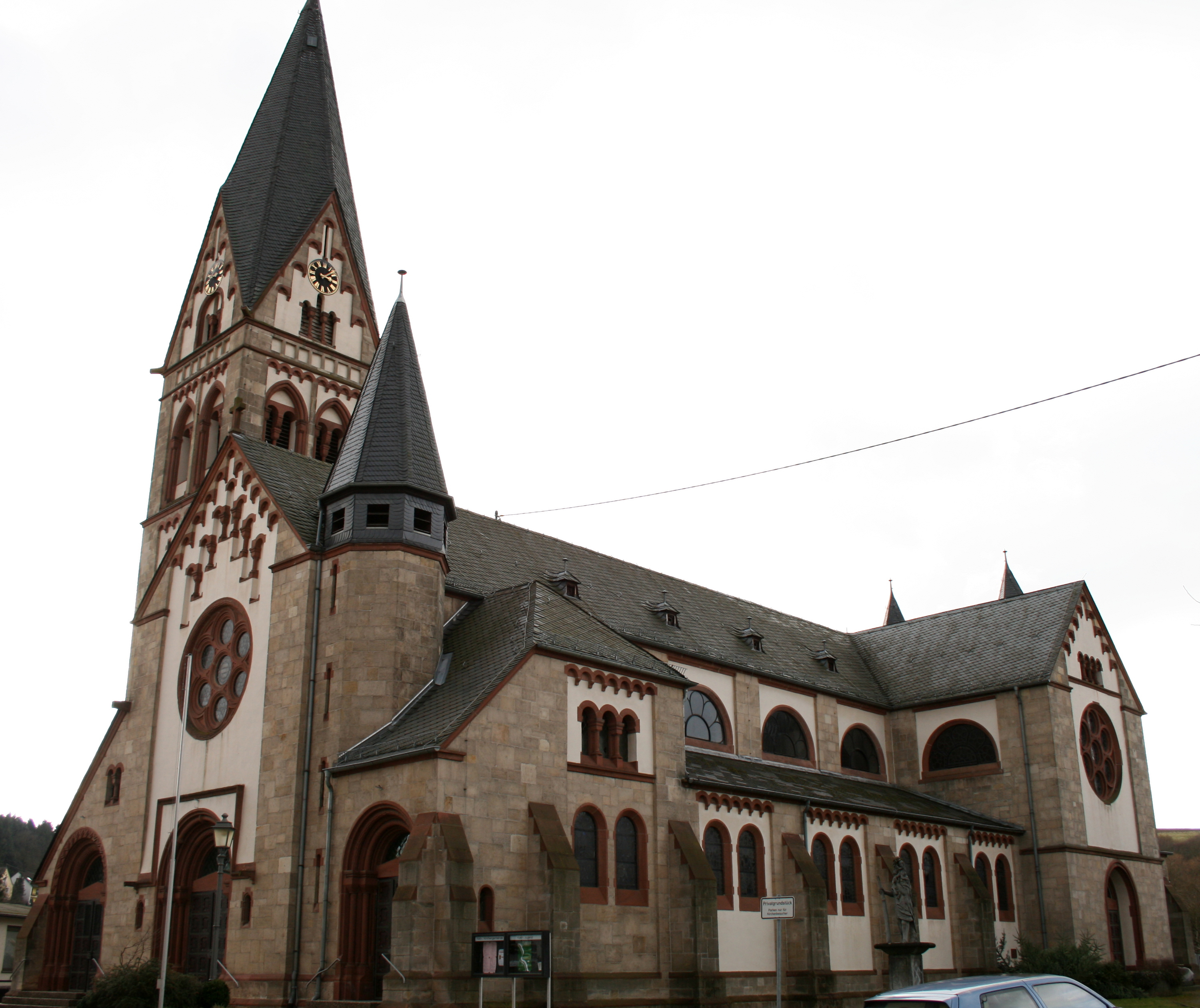
St. Christophorus parish church in Niederselters

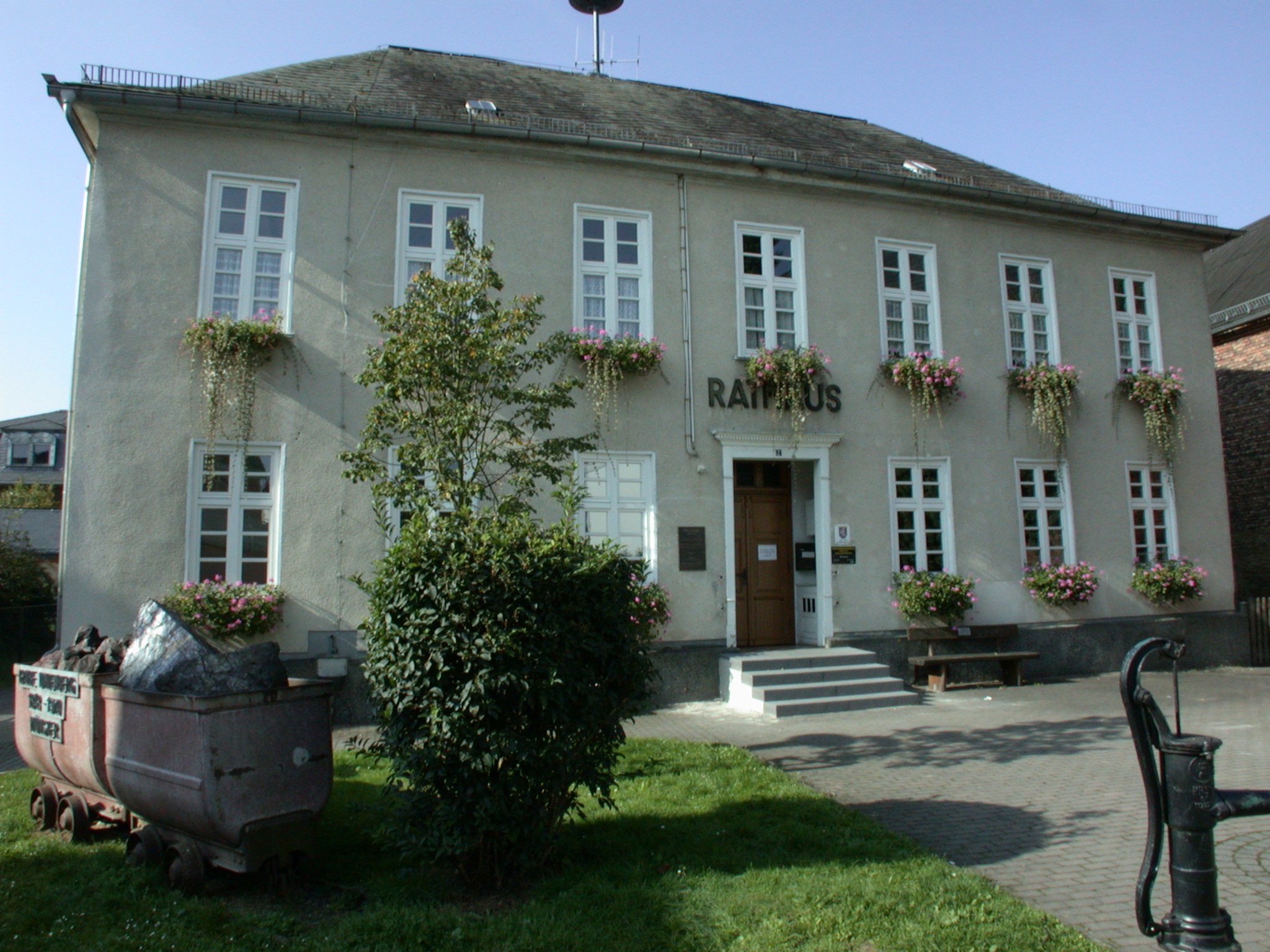
Old school and former town hall in Münster

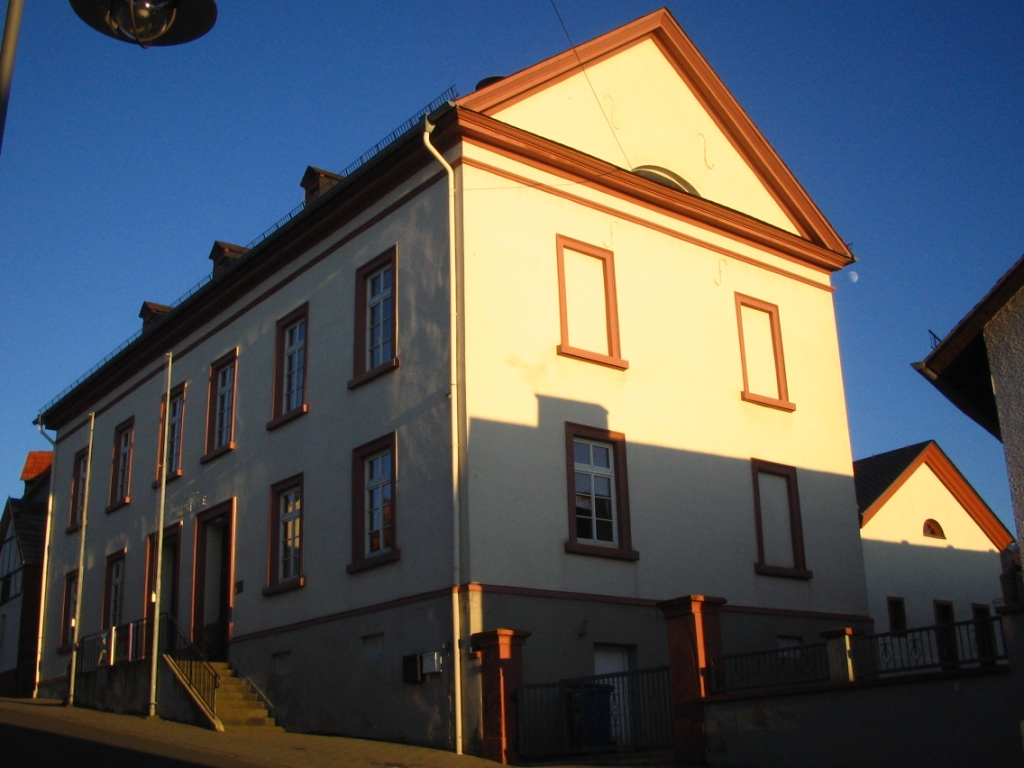
Classicist school in Haintchen

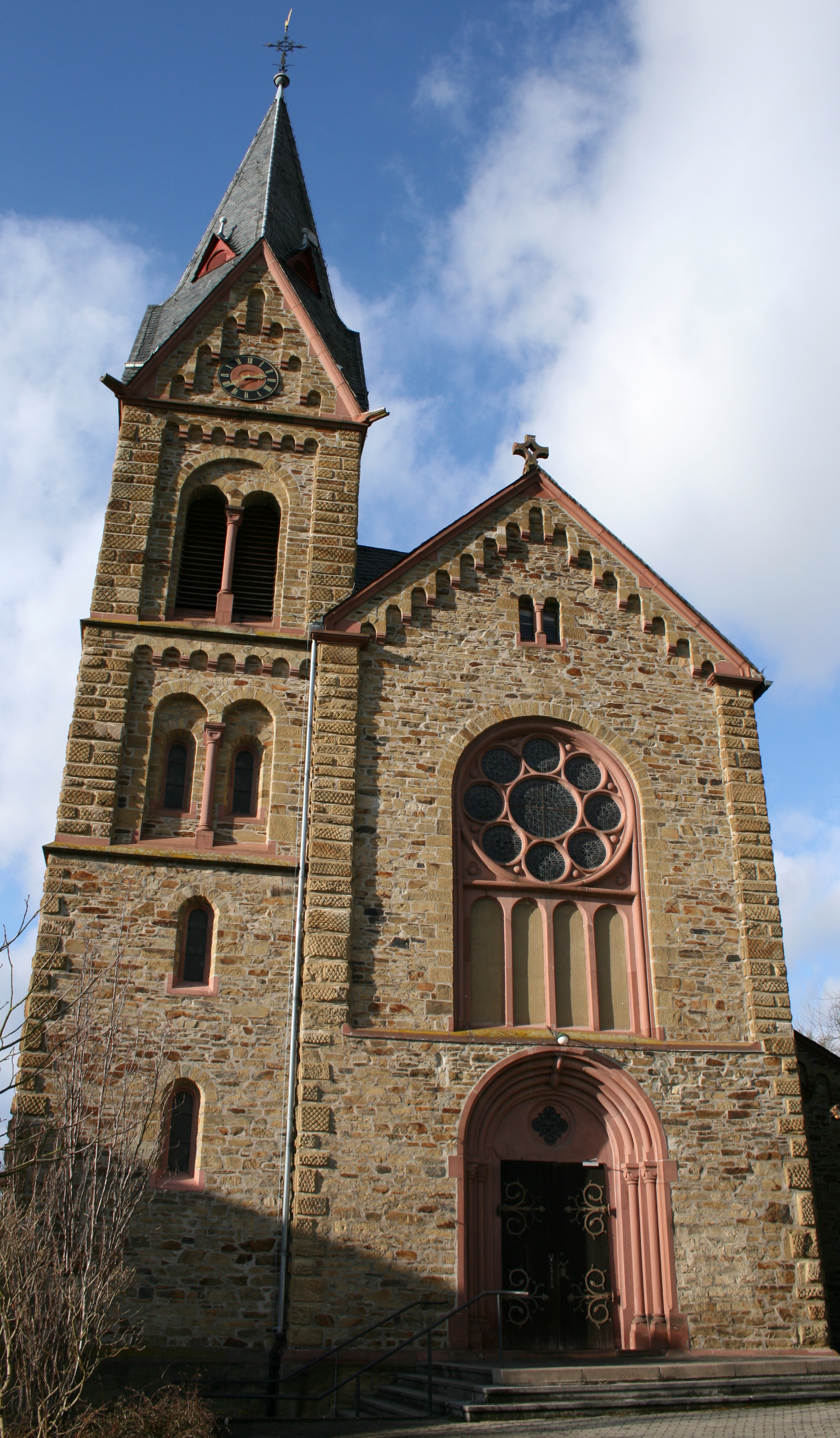
St. Petrus church in Eisenbach

== Selterswasser ==
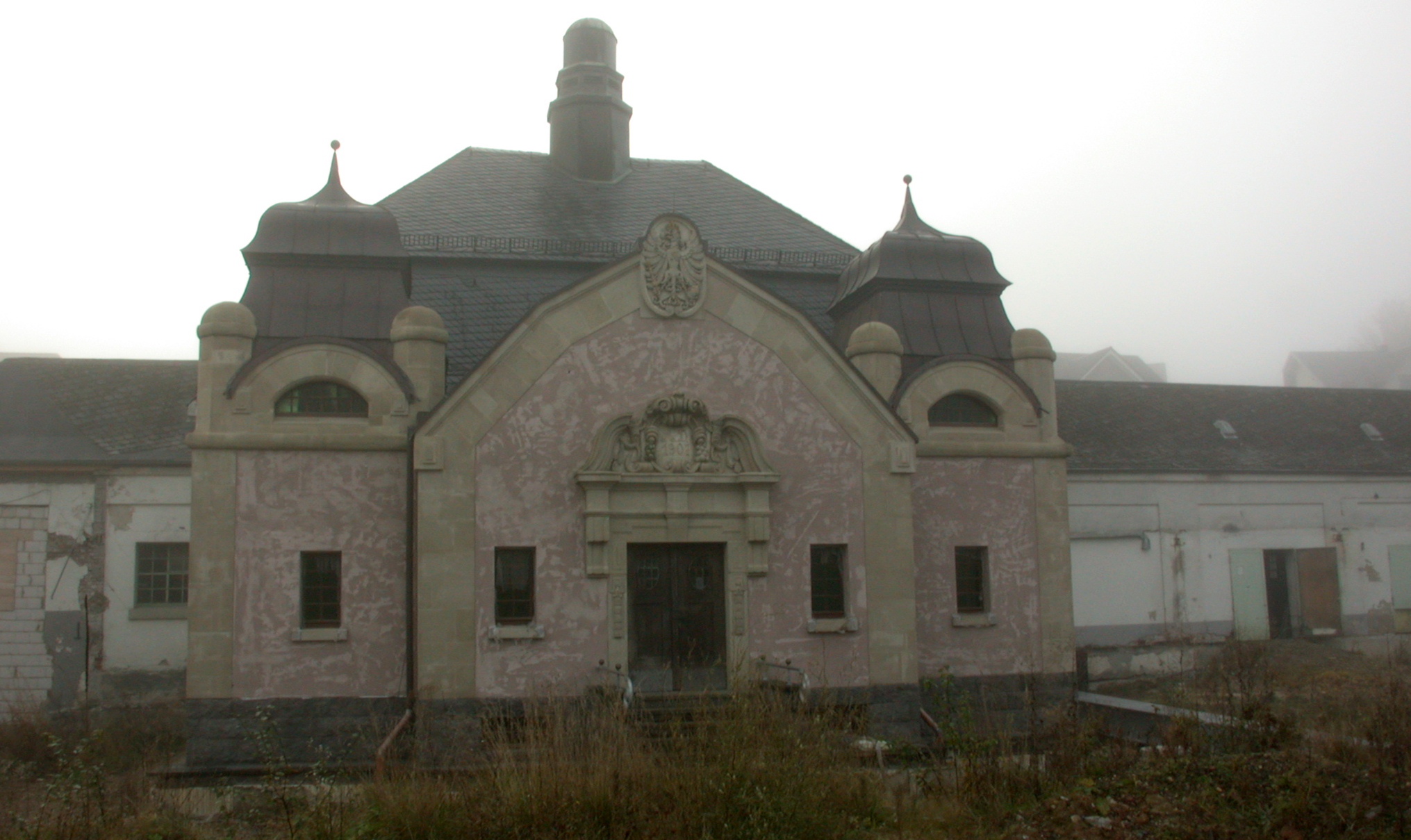
”Spring Temple” in Niederselters with former bottling building

A productive mineral spring is located in the centre of Niederselters, giving Selterswasser its name. The Selters spring was first mentioned in 772. In 1581, the city physician of Worms, Jacobus Theodorus Tabernaemontanus, dedicated ten pages to the Niederselters acidic spring in his spring chronicle Neuw Wasserschatz, thereby laying the groundwork for the spring’s fame and the subsequent development of a distinguished resort business.

Besides the rather unimportant taking of the waters, the Electorate of Trier ran a quickly growing water shipping business, sending the water in crocks from the Kannenbäckerland (a small nearby region in the Westerwaldkreis, well known for its ceramics) to Scandinavia, Russia, North America, Africa and even, as confirmed for the year 1791, as far as Batavia in the Dutch East Indies. From the placename “Selters” on the crocks then soon arose the name “Selters Water” as a brandname for mineral water of worldwide repute; the term "seltzer", referring generically to carbonated water, is derived from this brand. The Duchy of Nassau took over Niederselters as a welcome source of income and further expanded the export business. After the duchy was annexed by Prussia in 1866, the water’s name was changed to Königlich-Selters (“Royal Selters”), and when the monarchy ended, the water was given yet another name, Staatsquelle Niederselters (“Niederselters State Spring”). The state of Hesse, as Prussia’s legal successor, sold the spring in 1970, whereafter it changed owners ever more quickly, and in 1999 the bottling at the fountain in Niederselters was shut down. Since 2001, the community of Selters has owned the spring.

== Politics ==
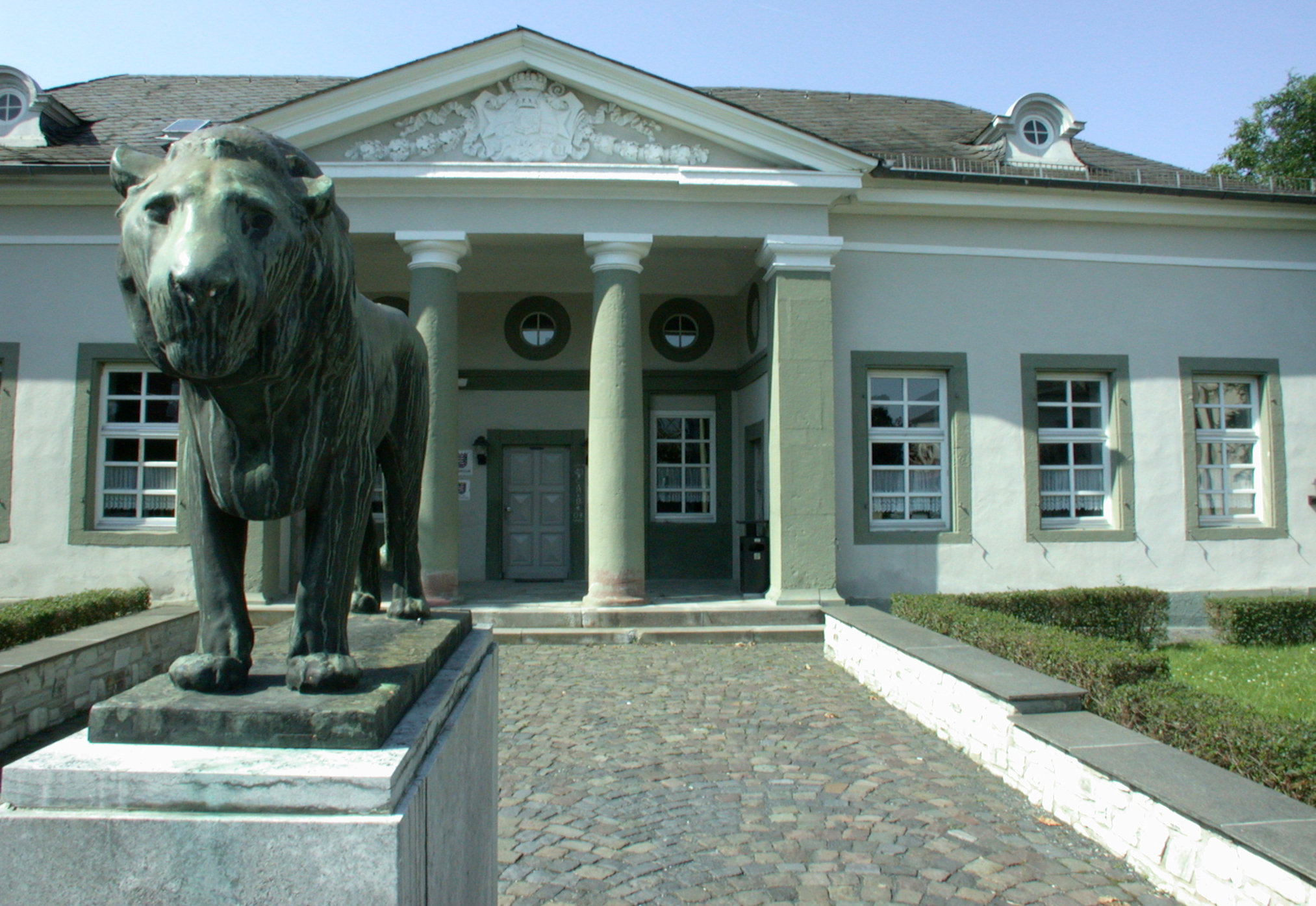
Selters’s town hall in Niederselters, former barracks of the Electorate of Trier

=== Community council ===
The municipal election held on 26 March 2006 yielded the following results:

Parties and voter communities		% 2006	seats 2006	% 2001	seats 2001
CDU	Christian Democratic Union of Germany	47.7	15	49.8	15
SPD	Social Democratic Party of Germany	28.5	9	34.0	11
BLN	Bürger Liste Niederselters	11.4	3	10.4	3
FWH	Freie Wählergemeinschaft Haintchen	6.2	2	5.8	2
FWM	Freie Wähler Münster	6.2	2	–	–
Total		100.0	31	100.0	31
voter turnout in %		43.0		46.1	

== Economy and infrastructure ==
=== Transport ===
Selters is linked to the long-distance road network by the Bad Camberg interchange on the A 3 (Cologne–Frankfurt) some 5 km away to the south. Furthermore, Bundesstraße 8 runs through Niederselters.

Niederselters station is located in the centre of Niederselters on the Main-Lahn Railway.

=== Education ===
For the community of Selters there is the Goldener Grund Mittelpunktschule (“midpoint school”, a central school, designed to eliminate smaller outlying schools) in Niederselters, which houses primary school, Hauptschule and Realschule programmes. The outlying centre of Haintchen also has its own primary school. For secondary school there is the Taunusschule in Bad Camberg. Also, some students from Selters also attend school in Limburg an der Lahn.

=== Public institutions ===
- Katholischer Kindergarten Eisenbach (Catholic)
- Gemeindeeigener Kindergarten Haintchen (municipal)
- Evangelischer Kindergarten Münster (Evangelical)
- Katholischer Kindergarten Niederselters (Catholic)
- Eisenbach Volunteer Fire Brigade, founded 1905 (includes Youth Fire Brigade)
- Haintchen Volunteer Fire Brigade, founded 1932 (includes Youth Fire Brigade)
- Münster Volunteer Fire Brigade, founded 1933 (includes Youth Fire Brigade)
- Niederselters Volunteer Fire Brigade, founded 1884 (includes Youth Fire Brigade)

== Jehovah’s Witnesses ==
The centre of the German branch of the Jehovah's Witnesses is found under the name Wachtturm Bibel- und Traktatgesellschaft der Zeugen Jehovas e.V. (“Watchtower Bible and Tract Society of the Jehovah’s Witnesses”) in the community of Selters in the Taunus. Since 1979, some 1,050 members of the religious group have been living and working in Niederselters in, among other places, printshops, translation offices, organizational and logistical departments and also workshops in the community that is somewhat like a religious order. Beginning with 2011, the German branch has been responsible for the work of Jehovah's Witnesses in Austria, Luxembourg, Liechtenstein and Switzerland.
