= Main-Lahn Railway =

Railway line in Germany

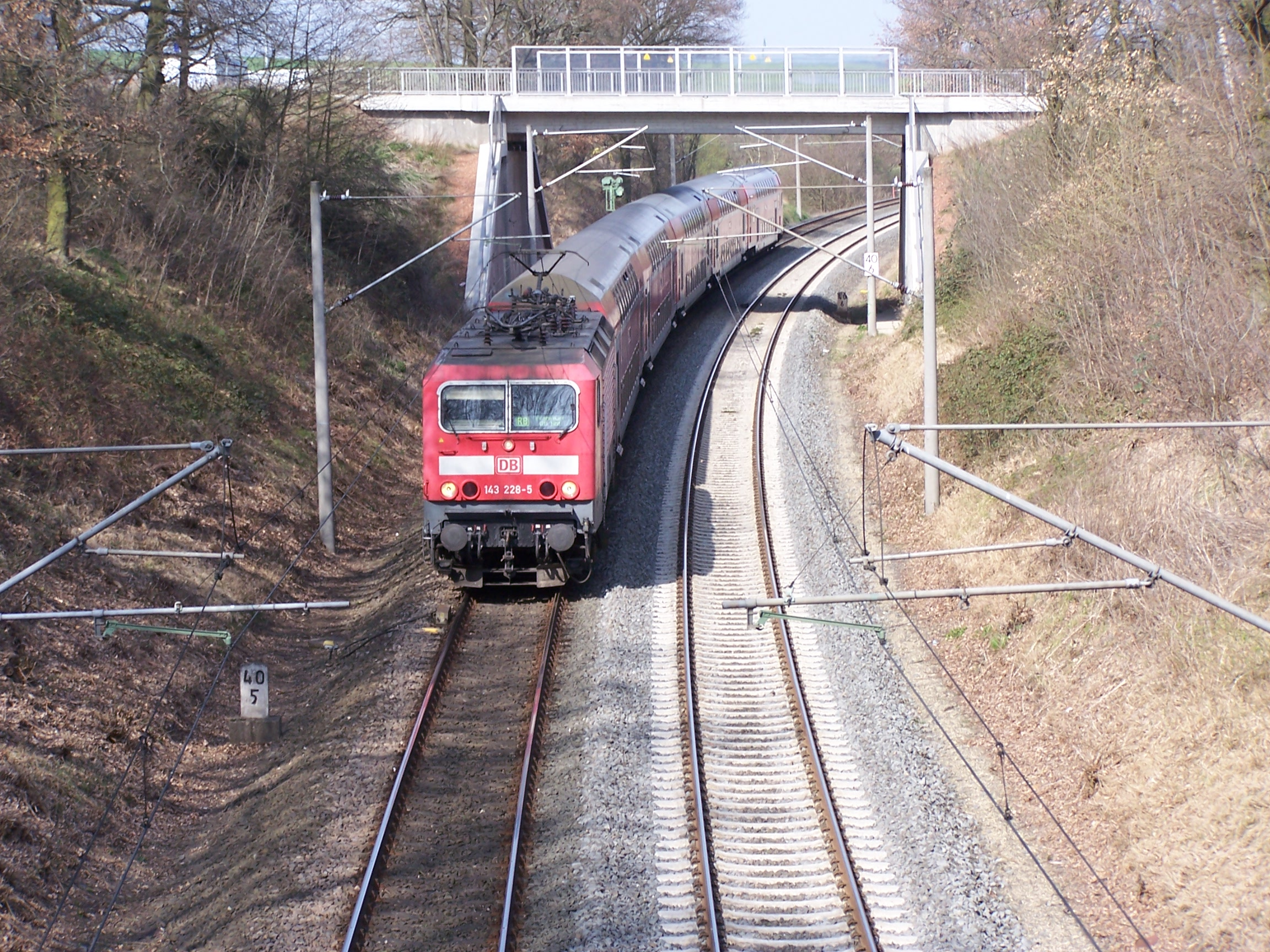
- Main-Lahn railway near Idstein

Overview
- Native name: Main-Lahn-Bahn
- Owner: Deutsche Bahn
- Line number: 3610
- Locale: Hesse, Germany
- Termini: Frankfurt (Main) Hbf; Eschhofen
- Stations: 21

Service
- Type: Heavy rail, passenger rail, regional rail, commuter rail
- Route number: 627; 645.2 (S Bahn)
- Operator(s): DB Bahn

History
- Opened: Stages between 1875-1877

Technical
- Line length: 66.5 km (41.3 mi)
- Number of tracks: Double track
- Track gauge: 1,435 mm (4 ft 8 1/2 in) standard gauge
- Electrification: 15 kV/16.7 Hz AC overhead
- Operating speed: 120 km/h (75 mph)
Route map
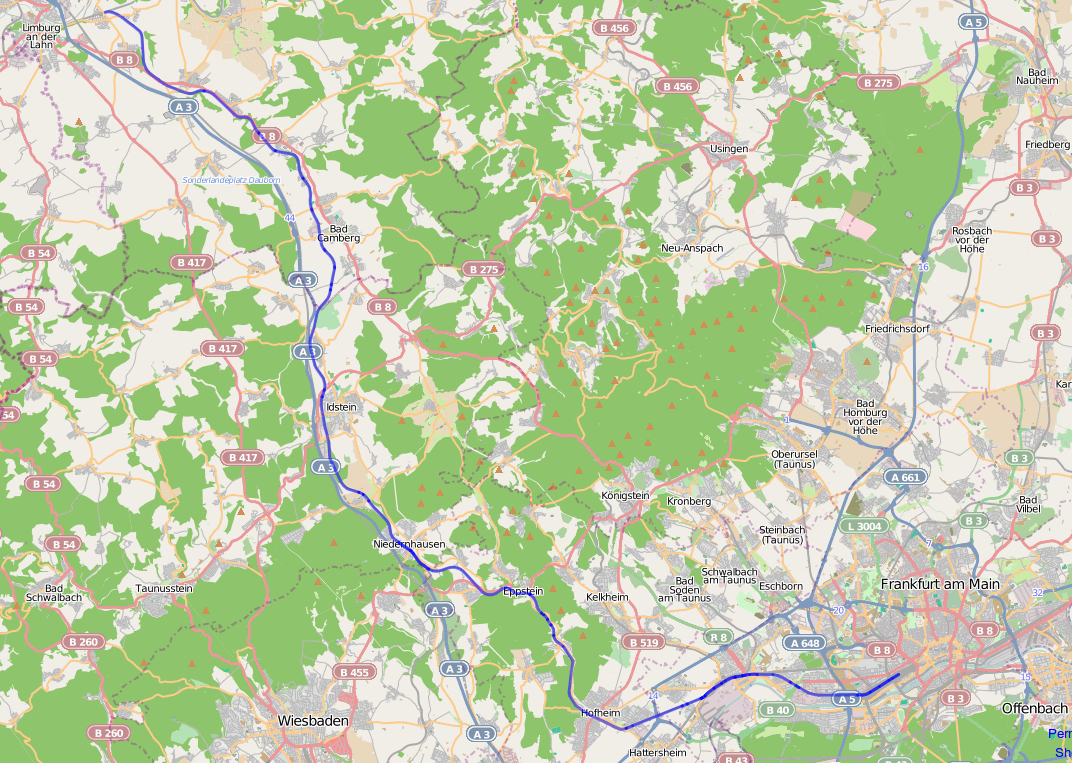
- Source: German railway atlas

The Main-Lahn railway (German: Main-Lahn-Bahn), also called the Limburg railway (Limburger Bahn), is a double-track, electrified main railway line in Germany. The 66.5-kilometer (41.3 mi) long line extends from Frankfurt Central Station (Hauptbahnhof) to Eschhofen, a borough of Limburg an der Lahn.

From Frankfurt to Niedernhausen, it operates as Rhine-Main S-Bahn line S2 and carries Deutsche Bahn route number 645.2. From Frankfurt Central Station to Frankfurt-Höchst, it also carries S-Bahn line S1 (which then follows the Taunus railway to Wiesbaden). From Niedernhausen to Eschhofen, it takes over Route number 627 from the Ländches Railway (Ländchesbahn). From Eschhofen, the line leads into the Lahntal railway (Lahntalbahn).

== History ==
A middle route through the Taunus between the Main and Lahn river valleys had been considered since 1850. However, construction was only begun under Prussian rule on 25 March 1872. The concession was awarded to the Hessian Ludwig Railway (Hessische Ludwigsbahn, or HLB). The construction began from Eschhofen and each finished section initially served mainly to transport material to the construction further forward.

The first section between Eschhofen and Niederselters was opened to traffic on 1 February 1875. The entire track was completed on 15 October 1877. The line from Niedernhausen to Wiesbaden Central Station, called the Ländchesbahn Railway, was launched on 1 July 1879.

Between 1911 and 1913, the single-track line was converted to double track. In 1971, the track was electrified between Frankfurt-Höchst and Niedernhausen, and in 1986 between Niedernhausen and Limburg.

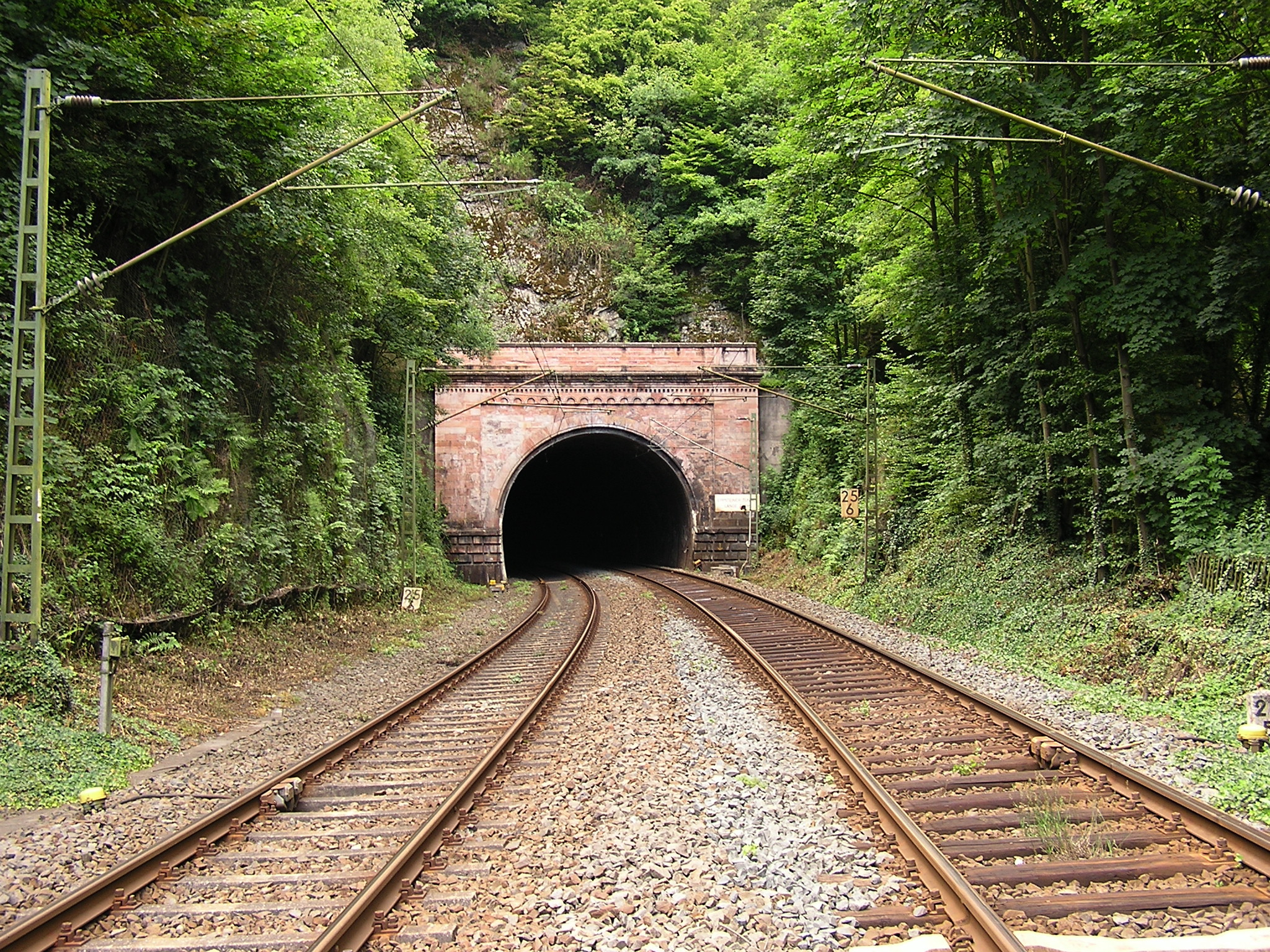
Eastern portal of the old Eppstein tunnel

Starting in 2009 the tunnel in Eppstein was replaced with a new tunnel because the old tunnel needed to be restored urgently and doing this with full operation of services would have led to years of disruption of rail services. In addition, a new tunnel would be cheaper in the long run, as a new concrete lining inside the tunnel would reduce the cross-section to the extent that it could no longer be operated as two tracks, and therefore a new tunnel would have to be built for traffic in the opposite direction anyway. The line was rerouted through the new tunnel during the Easter of 2013 and the old tunnel was subsequently filled.

In this context, Eppstein station is being rebuilt. The old station, which is a heritage-listed building, is no longer used by the railway. It was refurbished in 2007 and is now used as a government shopfront and a restaurant. The freight hall, which was also a heritage-listed building, has been demolished.

== Operations ==
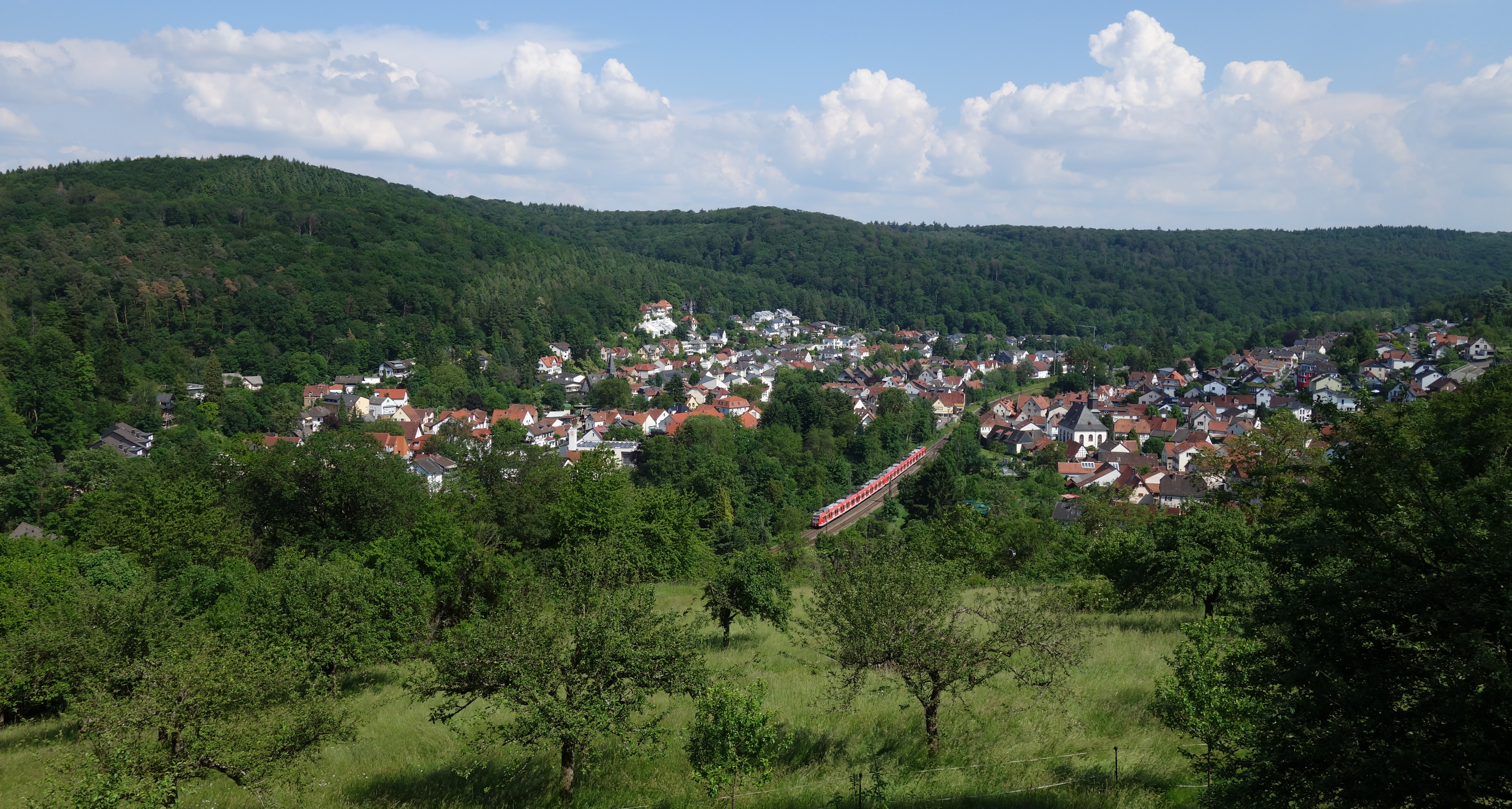
DB class 423 as S2 heading for Niedernhausen passing Lorsbach

The operation of steam locomotives ended in 1972. In 1978, S-Bahn line S2 opened between Frankfurt Hbf and Niedernhausen. The S-Bahn line is operated with class 423 electric multiple units. Regionalbahn RB 22 (hourly) and Regional-Express RE 20 (every two hours on weekdays) services had been operated mainly by DB Regio with class 143 locomotives since early 2006 and modern double-deck carriages since 2008. Since december 2021 the 143 have been replaced by class 146. Since then 143 are rarely in service, only as a substitute. In addition to RB 20 and RB 22, RB 21 services run every two hours (less on the weekend) on the section from Limburg to Niedernhausen are operated with Siemens Desiro Classic sets by Hessische Landesbahn, continuing over the Ländches Railway to Wiesbaden.
