= Cölbe station =

Railway station in Cölbe, Germany

Cölbe
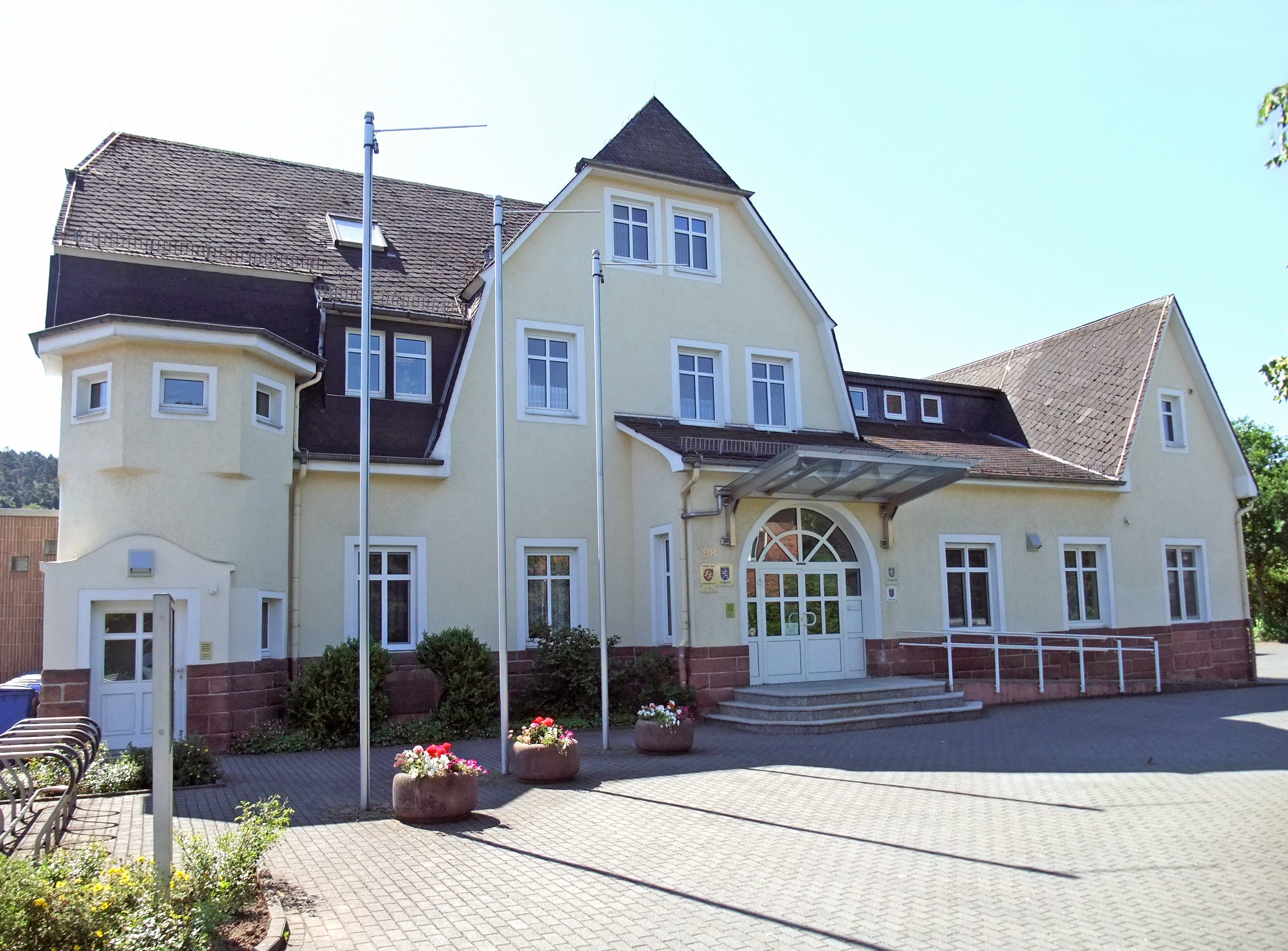

General information
- Location: Kasseler Str. 88, Cölbe, Hesse; Germany
- Coordinates: 50°50′54″N 8°47′16″E
- Owner: Deutsche Bahn
- Operator: DB Netz; DB Station&Service
- Lines: Main-Weser Railway (km 100.3) (KBS 620); Upper Lahn Valley Railway (km 104.4) (KBS 622); Burgwald Railway (km 88.5) (KBS 623)
- Platforms: 4

Construction
- Accessible: No
- Architect: Alois Holtmeyer
- Architectural style: Baroque Revival

Other information
- Station code: 1063
- DS100 code: FCOE
- IBNR: 8000065
- Category: 5
- Fare zone: : 0560
- Website: www.bahnhof.de

History
- Opened: 15 May 1852

Services
Preceding station	DB Regio Mitte	Following station
Bürgeln towards Treysa	RB 41	Marburg towards Frankfurt (Main) Hbf
Preceding station	Kurhessenbahn	Following station
Lahntal-Sarnau towards Erndtebrück	RB 94	Marburg (Lahn) Terminus
Wetter (Hessen) towards Brilon Stadt	RE 97	Marburg (Lahn) Terminus
Wetter (Hessen) towards Brilon Stadt	RB 97	Marburg (Lahn) Terminus
Location
- Location within Hesse Location within Germany Location within Europe

Cölbe station is a junction station on the Main-Weser Railway in the town of Cölbe in the German state of Hesse. Here the Upper Lahn Valley Railway (German: Obere Lahntalbahn) to Erndtebrück via Biedenkopf and Bad Laasphe and the Burgwald Railway to Frankenberg (Eder) via Wetter and Münchhausen branch off the main line. It has four platform tracks and a passing loop. The station is classified by Deutsche Bahn (DB) as a category 5 station. The Baroque Revival station is heritage-listed under the Hessian Heritage Act.

== History ==
Trains of the Main-Weser Railway, which opened in 1852, also stop at Cölbe since 1869. Over time, the importance of the station increased. Passenger and freight traffic grew, especially with the opening of the Upper Lahn Valley Railway and the Burgwald Railway. North of the station there were sidings connecting to businesses that shipped their freight via the station. Today, however, all the freight tracks have been removed. Cölbe is served only by stopping services. After the platform that was served by tracks 1 and 2 had deteriorated to the point that people were banned from entering it, it had to be closed and replaced. In the autumn of 2010, it was the paved and raised by Kurhessenbahn, a subsidiary of DB Regio. It is intended to replace the platform served by tracks 3 and 4 in the medium term.

== Location/transport links ==
The station is located on the eastern edge of Cölbe next to state highway L 3089. In addition to the entrance building, there are some park and ride spaces and the Cölbe Bahnhof bus stop, which is served by bus routes 72, 76, 481 and SEV. A pedestrian overpass over the L 3089 connects the station to the town centre.

== Entrance building ==
The Baroque Revival station is heritage-listed under the Hessian Heritage Act. The entrance building was designed by the architect Alois Holtmeyer in 1908. This is an L-shaped plaster building with a mansard roof to the west of the line. To its south is a T-shaped building, which is simpler in construction.

The building is now used by the municipality of Cölbe as an administrative building. It is necessary to walk around the building to get to the tracks because the pedestrian subway is behind it.

== Infrastructure ==
Cölbe station has five tracks, four of which are next to a platform. The two outer platform tracks (3 and 4) and the passing loop are used exclusively by trains on the Main-Weser Railway. Track 2 can be used by all trains, but normally it is only used by trains to Bad Laasphe/Erndtebrück or Frankenberg (Eder). Track 1 can be used by trains to and from the same places as track 2, but it cannot be used for trains from the Main-Weser Railway due to the lack of a connection. From this track sidings formerly branched off to commercial establishments. The track is used by trains from the Upper Lahn Valley Railway and the Burgwald Railway running to Marburg.

The station has two central platforms:

- A central platform between tracks 1 and 2 and is used by Kurhessenbahn services. It was extremely run down and too low for the trains for a long time. After the platform edge partially collapsed and it had become dangerous when boarding trains, it was closed down completely in early 2010 and replaced by a temporary platform on track 1. When the Burgwald Railway was modernised in the autumn of 2010, the platform was also modernised. It has been paved, provided with glass shelters and tactile paving, and the platform edge on track 2 was raised to 76 cm. The platform edge on track 1 remains at a height of 55 cm.
- The other central platform is between tracks 3 and 4. It is expected that it will also be renewed and raised in the medium term. It is used by all the trains stopping on the Main-Weser railway.

=== Track access ===
On the side of the entrance building facing the tracks there are stairs to the subway entrance connecting to the two central platforms. There is also a ticket machine and an information board with timetables. There is no platform next to the station building.

== Operations ==
The station is served on the Main-Weser Railway by the Mittelhessen-Express (RB 41) between Treysa and Frankfurt hourly. The RE 98 (Main-Sieg-Express) also stops running towards Kassel. The station is served hourly by trains on the Upper Lahn Valley Railway (RB 94) and the Burgwald Railway (RE/RB 97), which start/end at Marburg. Thus, trains run from Cölbe to Frankenberg (Eder), Biedenkopf, Bad Laasphe, Erndtebrück, Korbach, Brilon Stadt, Treysa, Marburg, Giessen, Friedberg and Frankfurt am Main. There has been growth in passenger numbers, especially since the takeover of the passenger traffic by Kurhessenbahn on the two branch lines in 2002. This is mainly due to the operation of more modern diesel multiple units and the provision of new and modernised stations on the lines.

=== Freight ===
Cölbe freight yard has not been used since the 1990s. Until then, the northern part of the station was used for loading the freight of local companies. Today, the only remains of the formerly extensive freight operations are the loading ramps and large open areas, which were formerly used for sidings.
