= List of railway routes in Hesse =

This is a list of regional rail services operated in Hesse. Rail services in southern Hesse are focussed on the city of Frankfurt and are organised by the Rhein-Main-Verkehrsverbund ("Rhine-Main Transport Association"), while rail services in northern Hesse are focussed on the city of Kassel and are organised by the Nordhessischer Verkehrsverbund ("North Hesse Transport Association").

== Southern Hesse (RMV) regional services ==
The Rhine-Main Transport Association has given unique numbers to its regional railway services in regular operation. Rhine-Main S-Bahn lines have a single digit with an "S" prefix, as is standard in Germany, while the remaining lines have two-digit numbers, preceded by two letters indicating the train class: "RB" (Regionalbahn) and "RE" (Regional-Express). The lines are mainly run to and from Frankfurt as the metropolis of the Rhine-Main region, but there are also a number of connecting lines between the major towns of the whole area.

Line	Service name / line Network	Route	KBS	Operator	Usual rolling stock
RE 2	Main Railway, East Rhine Railway; Rhein-Main-Nahe net	Frankfurt Hbf – Frankfurt Airport Regional – Rüsselsheim – Mainz Hbf – Bingen (Rhein) Hbf – Boppard Hbf – Koblenz Hbf	471	DB Regio Mitte	Stadler Flirt (429)
RE 3	Main Railway, Nahe Valley Railway; Southwest diesel net	Frankfurt Hbf – Frankfurt Airport Regional – Rüsselsheim – Mainz Hbf – Bad Kreuznach – Saarbrücken Hbf	471, 680	Vlexx	Alstom Coradia LINT
RE 4	Mainz–Ludwigshafen railway	Karlsruhe – Ludwigshafen – Frankenthal – Worms – Mainz Hbf	660	DB Regio Mitte	Stadler Flirt (429)
RE 5	Frankfurt–Göttingen railway Kinzigtal-Netz	Frankfurt Hbf – Frankfurt Süd – Hanau Hbf – Fulda – Bad Hersfeld – Bebra	640, 615	DB Regio Mitte	Bombardier Traxx P1160 AC1 + double deck coaches Siemens Vectron (MRCE 193) + double deck coaches
RB 5	Frankfurt–Göttingen railway, Bebra–Baunatal-Guntershausen railway Nordost-Hessen-Netz	Fulda – Hünfeld – Burghaun – Bad Hersfeld – Bebra – Melsungen – Kassel Hbf	610	Cantus	Talent 2 Stadler Flirt
RE 9	East Rhine Railway, Taunus Railway; Rheingau-Netz	Eltville – Niederwalluf – Wiesbaden-Schierstein – Wiesbaden-Biebrich – Mainz-Kastel – Frankfurt-Höchst – Frankfurt Hbf	466	HLB	Alstom Coradia Continental
RB 10	RheingauLinie (East Rhine Railway); Rheingau-Netz	Frankfurt Hbf – Frankfurt-Höchst – Mainz-Kastel – Wiesbaden Hbf – Eltville – Rüdesheim – Lorch – Lorchhausen – Koblenz Hbf – Neuwied	466	VIAS	Stadler Flirt
RB 12	Königstein Railway; Taunus-Netz	Frankfurt Hbf – Frankfurt-Höchst – Königstein im Taunus	646	DB Regio Mitte	iLint (?)
RE 13	Donnersberg Railway, Alzey–Mainz railway Dieselnetz Südwest	(Frankfurt Hbf – Frankfurt Flughafen Regionalbahnhof – Rüsselsheim –) Mainz Hbf – Alzey – Kirchheimbolanden	471, 680	Vlexx	LINT
RE 14	Mainz–Ludwigshafen railway, Taunus Railway	Mannheim Hbf – Ludwigshafen (Rhein) – Frankenthal – Worms – Mainz Hbf	660	DB Regio Mitte	Stadler Flirt (429)
RB 15	Taunus Railway (High Taunus); Taunus-Netz	(Frankfurt Hbf –) Bad Homburg – Friedrichsdorf – Brandoberndorf	637	DB Regio Mitte	iLint (?)
RB 16	Friedberg–Friedrichsdorf railway Netz Wetterau West-Ost	Friedrichsdorf – Friedberg	636	DB Regio Mitte	iLint (?)
RE 20	Main-Lahn Railway; Netz Taunusstrecke	Frankfurt Hbf – Höchst – Niedernhausen – Limburg an der Lahn	627	DB Regio Mitte	143 + 3–5 double deck carriages LINT (only HLB 25678 and 25679)
RB 21	Ländches Railway, Main-Lahn Railway; Taunus-Netz	Wiesbaden Hbf – Niedernhausen (– Limburg an der Lahn)	627	HLB	Desiro, GTW 2/6
RB 22	Main-Lahn Railway; Netz Taunusstrecke	Frankfurt Hbf – Höchst – Niedernhausen – Limburg an der Lahn		DB Regio HLB	143 + 3–5 double deck carriages LINT (only HLB 25678 and 25679)
RB 23	Lahntal railway Left Rhein Railway, Eifelquer Railway	Limburg an der Lahn – Diez – Bad Ems – Koblenz Hbf – Andernach – Mayen Ost	625	DB Regio Mitte	LINT 27/41
RE 24	Lahntal railway network Lahntal-/Vogelsberg-/Rhönbahn	Gießen – Wetzlar – Weilburg	625	HLB	Coradia LINT 41
RE 25	Lahntal railway Dieselnetz Eifel-Westerwald-Sieg	Gießen – Wetzlar – Weilburg – Limburg an der Lahn – Koblenz Hbf (– Andernach – Mayen)	625	DB Regio	LINT, TALENT
RB 26	MittelrheinBahn	Cologne – Bonn – Remagen – Andernach – Koblenz – Bingen – Mainz Hbf	470	trans regio	1–2 × 460; Siemens Mireo
RB 29	Lower Westerwald Railway; Dieselnetz Eifel-Westerwald-Sieg	Limburg an der Lahn – Elz Süd – Montabaur – Siershahn	629	HLB	LINT 27/41, GTW 2/6
RE 30	Main-Weser Railway; Main-Weser net	Frankfurt Hbf – Friedberg – Gießen – Marburg – Neustadt (Hessen) – Treysa – Kassel Hbf	630, 620	DB Regio Mitte	146 + 6–7 double-deck cars
RB 31	Donnersberg Railway, Alzey–Mainz railway Dieselnetz Südwest	(Frankfurt Hbf – Frankfurt Airport Regional – Rüsselsheim –) Mainz Hbf – Alzey – Kirchheimbolanden	471, 680	Vlexx	LINT
RB 33	Main Railway, Nahe Valley Railway; Dieselnetz Südwest	(Frankfurt Hbf – Frankfurt Airport Regional – Rüsselsheim –) Mainz Hbf – Bad Kreuznach – Kirn – Idar-Oberstein	471, 680	Vlexx	LINT
RB 34	Nidder Valley Railway; Niddertal net	Frankfurt Hbf – Bad Vilbel – Nidderau – Glauburg-Stockheim	634	DB Regio Mitte	Desiro, 245 + double deck carriages
RB 37	Main–Weser Railway	Frankfurt Hbf – Friedberg – Gießen (– Marburg – Kirchhain)	630, 620	HLB	Coradia Continental
RB 40	Mittelhessen-Express; Mittelhessen net	Frankfurt Hbf – Friedberg – Butzbach – Gießen – Wetzlar – Herborn – Dillenburg	630, 445	HLB	Coradia Continental (weekdays to Gießen together with RB 41)
RB 41	Mittelhessen-Express; Mittelhessen net	Frankfurt Hbf – Friedberg – Butzbach – Gießen – Marburg – Cölbe – Stadtallendorf – Neustadt (Hessen) – Treysa	630, 445	HLB	Coradia Continental (weekdays to Gießen together with RB 40)
RB 45	Lahntal railway Vogelsberg Railway; Netz Lahntal-/Vogelsberg-/Rhönbahn	Limburg an der Lahn – Weilburg – Wetzlar – Gießen – Grünberg – Alsfeld – Lauterbach Nord – Fulda	635	HLB	LINT 41
RB 46	Gießen–Gelnhausen railway Wetterau West-Ost net	Gießen – Hungen – Nidda – Glauburg-Stockheim – Büdingen – Gelnhausen	631	HLB	GTW 2/6
RB 47	Friedberg–Mücke railway Wetterau West-Ost net	Friedberg – Wölfersheim-Södel	632	HLB	GTW 2/6
RB 48	Beienheim–Schotten railway Niddertal-Netz	Frankfurt Hbf – Friedberg (Hess) – Beienheim – Nidda	632	DB Regio (4×daily); HLB (1×daily)	DB Regio: Traxx (245) + double-deck cars HLB: GTW 2/6
RB 48	Beienheim–Schotten railway Netz Wetterau West-Ost	Friedberg (Hess) – Beienheim – Nidda	632	HLB	GTW 2/6
RB 49	Friedberg-Hanau railway Mittelhessen net	Gießen – Friedberg – Nidderau – Hanau Hbf	633	HLB	Coradia Continental
RE 50	Kinzig Valley Railway; Kinzigtal net	Frankfurt Hbf – Offenbach Hbf – Hanau Hbf – Wächtersbach – Schlüchtern – Fulda	615	DB Regio Mitte	114 + double deck carriages
RB 51	Kinzig Valley Railway; Kinzigtal net	Frankfurt Hbf – Offenbach Hbf – Hanau Hbf – Langenselbold – Gelnhausen – Wächtersbach (at rush hour to Bad Soden-Salmünster)	615	DB Regio Mitte	114 + double deck carriages
RB 52	Fulda–Gersfeld railway Lahntal-/Vogelsberg-/Rhönbahn net	Fulda – Gersfeld (Rhön)	616	HLB	LINT 41
RB 53	Flieden–Gemünden railway Main-Spessart railway, Bamberg–Würzburg railway Würzburg electric net	Schlüchtern – Sterbfritz – Jossa – Gemünden am Main – Würzburg Hbf – Schweinfurt Stadt – Bamberg	801, 800, 810	DB Regio Mitte	440
RE 54	North Main line, Main-Spessart railway Main-Spessart-Netz	Frankfurt Hbf – Frankfurt South – Frankfurt Ost – Maintal – Hanau Hbf – Kahl am Main – Aschaffenburg Hbf – Gemünden (Main) – Würzburg Hbf – Bamberg	640	DB Regio Bayern	Bombardier Twindexx Vario
RE 55	South Main line, Main-Spessart railway Main-Spessart-Netz	Frankfurt Hbf – Frankfurt South – Offenbach Hbf – Hanau Hbf – Kahl am Main – Aschaffenburg Hbf – Gemünden (Main) – Würzburg Hbf – Bamberg	640	DB Regio Bayern	Bombardier Twindexx Vario
RB 56	Kahlgrund Railway; Kahlgrund-Netz	Hanau Hbf – Großkrotzenburg – Kahl am Main – Alzenau – Schöllkrippen	642	Westfrankenbahn	Desiro
RB 58	Frankfurt–Hanau railway, Main-Spessart railway future Südhessen-Untermain subnet	Rüsselsheim Opelwerk – Frankfurt Airport Fernbf – Frankfurt Hbf – Frankfurt Süd – Maintal – Hanau Hbf – Großkrotzenburg – Kahl am Main – Aschaffenburg Hbf	640	HLB	Coradia Continental
RE 59	Frankfurt Airport loop, Main Railway, North Main line, Main-Spessart railway Main-Spessart-Netz	Frankfurt Airport – Frankfurt Süd – Offenbach Hbf – Hanau Hbf – Kahl am Main – Aschaffenburg Hbf – Gemünden (Main) – Würzburg Hbf – Bamberg	640	HLB	Coradia Continental
RE 60	Main-Neckar Railway; Main-Neckar net	Frankfurt Hbf – Darmstadt Hbf – Bensheim – Heppenheim – Weinheim – Mannheim Hbf	650	DB Regio Mitte	Bombardier Twindexx Vario
RB 61	Dreieich Railway; Dreieich net	Frankfurt Hbf – Dreieich-Buchschlag – Rödermark - Ober-Roden – Dieburg	647	DB Regio Mitte	Pesa Link
RB 61	Dreieich Railway; Dreieich net	Neu-Isenburg – Dreieich-Buchschlag – Rödermark – Ober-Roden (– Dieburg)	647	DB Regio Mitte	Pesa Link
RB 66	Pfungstadt Railway; Odenwald-Netz	Darmstadt Hbf – Darmstadt-Eberstadt – Pfungstadt	650.1	VIAS	ITINO
RB 68	Main-Neckar Railway	Frankfurt Hbf – Darmstadt Hbf – Hähnlein-Alsbach – Bensheim – Heppenheim – Weinheim – Neu-Edingen/Friedrichsfeld – Heidelberg Hbf (– Wiesloch-Walldorf)	650	DB Regio Mitte	Bombardier Twindexx Vario
RE 70	Mannheim–Frankfurt railway Ried-Netz	Frankfurt Hbf – Riedstadt-Goddelau – Gernsheim – Biblis – Mannheim Hbf	655	DB Regio Mitte	Bombardier Twindexx Vario
RB 75	Rhine-Main Railway; Südhessen-Netz	Wiesbaden Hbf – Mainz Hbf – Groß-Gerau – Darmstadt Hbf – Dieburg – Babenhausen – Aschaffenburg Hbf	651	HLB	Coradia Continental
RE 80	Odenwald Railway; Odenwald net	Darmstadt Hbf – Darmstadt Nord – Reinheim – Groß-Umstadt Wiebelsbach – Erbach	641	VIAS	ITINO
RB 81	Odenwald Railway; Odenwald net	Darmstadt Nord – Reinheim – Groß-Umstadt-Wiebelsbach – Erbach	641	VIAS	ITINO
RB 82	Odenwald Railway; Odenwald net	Darmstadt Hbf – Darmstadt Nord – Reinheim – Groß-Umstadt Wiebelsbach – Erbach – Eberbach	641	VIAS	ITINO
RE 85	Odenwald Railway; Odenwald net	Frankfurt Hbf – Offenbach Hbf – Hanau Hbf – Babenhausen – Groß-Umstadt-Wiebelsbach (– Erbach)	641	VIAS	ITINO
RB 86	Odenwald Railway; Odenwald net	Hanau Hbf – Babenhausen – Groß-Umstadt-Wiebelsbach	641	VIAS	ITINO
RB 87	Frankfurt–Göttingen railway, Leinefelde–Treysa railway Nordost-Hessen-Netz	(Fulda – Hünfeld – Burghaun – Bad Hersfeld –) Bebra – Eschwege – Göttingen	610	Cantus	Stadler Flirt Bombardier Talent 2
RB 90	Limburg–Altenkirchen railway	Limburg an der Lahn – Hadamar – Wilsenroth – Westerburg – Altenkirchen – Au (Sieg) – Siegen	461, 460	HLB	LINT 27/41, GTW 2/6
RB 94	Kreuztal–Cölbe railway	Marburg (Lahn) – Cölbe – Friedensdorf – Biedenkopf – Wallau (Lahn) – Bad Laasphe – Erndtebrück	623	Kurhessenbahn	628
RB 95	Sieg-Dill railway	Dillenburg – Haiger – Dillbrecht – Siegen	445	HLB	LINT 27/41, GTW 2/6
RB 96	Betzdorf–Haiger railway	Dillenburg – Haiger – Allendorf – Burbach – Neunkirchen – Betzdorf (Sieg)	462	HLB	GTW 2/6
RE 97; RB 97	Warburg–Sarnau railway, Wega–Brilon Wald railway, Alme Valley Railway; RegioNetz Kurhessen	Marburg (Lahn) – Cölbe – Wetter – Münchhausen– Frankenberg (Eder) – Vöhl-Herzhausen – Korbach Hbf – Brilon Wald – Brilon Stadt	622	Kurhessenbahn	Siemens Desiro Classic
RE 98	Main-Sieg-Express	Frankfurt Hbf – Friedberg (Hess) – Gießen – Marburg (Lahn) – Treysa – Wabern – Kassel Hbf	630, 620	HLB	FLIRT 429 (to Gießen together with RE 99)
RE 99	Main-Sieg-Express	Frankfurt Hbf – Friedberg (Hess) – Gießen – Wetzlar – Herborn – Dillenburg – Haiger – Siegen	630, 445	HLB	FLIRT 429 (to Gießen together with RE 98)

=== Rhine-Main S-Bahn ===
Line	Service name / line Network	Route	KBS	Operator	Usual rolling stock
S1 (Rhine-Main S-Bahn)	Taunus Railway, Main-Lahn Railway, Frankfurt City Tunnel, Rodgau Railway; Netz Kleyer	Wiesbaden Hbf – Mainz-Kastel – Hochheim – Hattersheim – Frankfurt-Höchst – Frankfurt Hbf (tief) – Offenbach Ost – Rödermark-Ober-Roden	645.1, 645.2	DB Regio	430
S2 (Rhine-Main S-Bahn)	Main-Lahn Railway, Frankfurt City Tunnel, Rodgau Railway, Offenbach-Bieber–Dietzenbach railway Netz S2	Niedernhausen – Hofheim – Frankfurt-Höchst – Frankfurt Hbf (tief) – Offenbach Ost – Dietzenbach	645.2	DB Regio	423, 430 (some peak services)
S3 (Rhine-Main S-Bahn)	Limes Railway, Frankfurt City Tunnel, Main-Neckar Railway; Netz Gallus	Bad Soden am Taunus – Frankfurt-Rödelheim – Frankfurt West – Frankfurt Hbf (tief) – Frankfurt South	645.3	DB Regio	423
S4 (Rhine-Main S-Bahn)	Kronberg Railway, Frankfurt City Tunnel, Main-Neckar Railway; Netz Gallus	Kronberg im Taunus – Frankfurt-Rödelheim – Frankfurt West – Frankfurt Hbf (tief) – Frankfurt South	645.4	DB Regio	430
S5 (Rhine-Main S-Bahn)	Homburg Railway, Frankfurt City Tunnel; Netz Gallus	Friedrichsdorf – Bad Homburg – Oberursel – Frankfurt-Rödelheim – Frankfurt West – Frankfurt Hbf (tief) – Frankfurt South	645.5	DB Regio	423
S6 (Rhine-Main S-Bahn)	Main-Weser Railway, Frankfurt City Tunnel; Netz Gallus	(Friedberg –) Groß-Karben – Bad Vilbel – Frankfurt West – Frankfurt Hbf (tief) – Frankfurt South – Langen (– Darmstadt Hbf)	645.6, 650	DB Regio	423
S7 (Rhine-Main S-Bahn)	Mannheim–Frankfurt railway Netz Kleyer	Riedstadt-Goddelau – Groß-Gerau-Dornberg – Frankfurt Stadion – Frankfurt-Niederrad – Frankfurt Hbf	655	DB Regio	425
S8 (Rhine-Main S-Bahn)	Main Railway, Frankfurt City Tunnel, Frankfurt–Hanau (south bank) railway Netz Kleyer	Wiesbaden Hbf – Mainz Hbf – Mainz-Bischofsheim – Rüsselsheim – Frankfurt Airport Regional – Frankfurt Stadion – Frankfurt-Niederrad – Frankfurt Hbf (tief) – Offenbach Ost (– Hanau Hbf)	645.8	DB Regio	430
S9 (Rhine-Main S-Bahn)	Taunus Railway, Main Railway, Frankfurt City Tunnel, Frankfurt–Hanau (south bank) railway Netz Kleyer	Wiesbaden Hbf – Mainz-Kastel – Mainz-Bischofsheim – Rüsselsheim – Frankfurt Flughafen Regionalbahnhof – Frankfurt Stadion – Frankfurt Hbf (tief) – Offenbach Ost – Hanau Hbf	645.9	DB Regio	430

== Northern Hesse (NVV) regional services ==
The following regional services are organised by the Nordhessischer Verkehrsverbund (North Hesse transport association):

Line	Route	Lines used	KBS	Operator	Frequency (in min)	Rolling stock
RE 2	Kassel-Wilhelmshöhe – Hann Münden – Witzenhausen Nord – Eichenberg – Leinefelde – Erfurt Hbf	Kassel–Göttingen–Hannover; Hann. Münden–Halle; Leinefelde–Gotha; Bebra–Halle	600, 603, 604	DB Regio Südost	120	Siemens Desiro Classic (642)
RB 4	Korbach – Volkmarsen – Wolfhagen – Zierenberg – Kassel-Wilhelmshöhe	Warburg–Volkmarsen–Korbach–Sarnau; Volkmarsen–Vellmar-Obervellmar; Vellmar-Obervellmar–Kassel-Wilhelmshöhe	612	Kurhessenbahn	60	Siemens Desiro Classic (642)
RB 5	Kassel Hbf – Kassel-Wilhelmshöhe – Melsungen – Rotenburg an der Fulda – Bebra – Bad Hersfeld – Fulda	Kassel–Frankfurt; Baunatal-Guntershausen–Bebra; Frankfurt–Göttingen	610	cantus	60	Stadler Flirt (427/428) Bombardier Talent 2 (442)
RE 5	Kassel Hbf – Kassel-Wilhelmshöhe – Melsungen – Bebra – Bad Hersfeld	Kassel–Frankfurt; Baunatal-Guntershausen–Bebra; Frankfurt–Göttingen	610	cantus	60 (Mon–Fri); 120 (Sat + Sun)	Stadler Flirt (427/428) Bombardier Talent 2 (442)
RB 6	Eisenach – Hörschel – Herleshausen – Gerstungen – Bebra	Halle–Eisenach–Bebra	605	cantus	60 (Mon–Fri); 120 (Sat + Sun)	Stadler Flirt (427/428)
RE 9	Kassel-Wilhelmshöhe – Hann. Münden – Witzenhausen Nord – Eichenberg – Leinefelde – Nordhausen – Sangerhausen – Halle Hbf	Hannover–Göttingen–Kassel; Halle–Hann. Münden	590; 600; 611	Abellio Rail Mitteldeutschland	120	Bombardier Talent 2 (442, three or five parts)
RE 11 (RRX)	Kassel-Wilhelmshöhe – Hofgeismar – Warburg (Westf) – Altenbeken – Paderborn Hbf – Hamm (Westf) – Dortmund Hbf – Bochum Hbf – Essen Hbf – Duisburg Hbf – Düsseldorf Hbf	Kassel–Warburg; Warburg–Hamm; Hamm–Dortmund; Dortmund–Duisburg; Duisburg–Köln	415.1; 415.2; 490	National Express	120 (with gaps) alternating with RE 17	1–2× Siemens Desiro HC (160 km/h)
RE 17 (Sauerland-Express)	Kassel-Wilhelmshöhe – Hofgeismar – Warburg (Westf) – Brilon Wald – Arnsberg – Fröndenberg – Schwerte – Hagen Hbf	Kassel–Warburg; Warburg–Hagen	435	DB Regio NRW	120 (with gaps) alternating with RE 11	Pesa Link (633)
RE 30	Kassel Hbf – Kassel-Wilhelmshöhe – Wabern – Treysa – Marburg (Lahn) – Gießen – Frankfurt (Main)	Kassel–Frankfurt	635	DB Regio Mitte	120; Treysa–Frankfurt alternating with RE 98	114 / 146 + 6–7 double-deck coaches
RB 38	Kassel Hbf – Kassel-Wilhelmshöhe – Wabern – Treysa	Kassel–Frankfurt	635	Kurhessenbahn	Some peak trips	Siemens Desiro Classic (642)
RE 39/RB 39	Kassel Hbf – Kassel-Wilhelmshöhe – Wabern – Fritzlar – Bad Wildungen	Kassel–Frankfurt; Wabern–Bad Wildungen	621	Kurhessenbahn	120	Siemens Desiro Classic (642)
RB 83	Göttingen – Eichenberg – Witzenhausen Nord – Hann Münden – Kassel Hbf (joined to RB 87 on Göttingen – Eichenberg section)	Frankfurt–Göttingen; Halle–Hann. Münden; Hannover–Hann. Münden–Kassel	611	Cantus	60 30 (peak)	Stadler Flirt (427/428)
RB 85	Göttingen – Wesertal-Vernawahlshausen – Bodenfelde – Bad Karlshafen – Höxter-Ottbergen – Altenbeken – Paderborn Hbf	Göttingen–Bodenfelde; Northeim–Ottbergen; Kreiensen–Altenbeken	355 Süd	NordWestBahn	60 (Mon–Fri) 120 (Sat+Sun)	Bombardier Talent (643)
RB 87	Göttingen – Eichenberg – Eschwege – Bebra (joined to RB 83 on Göttingen – Eichenberg section)	Frankfurt–Göttingen	613	Cantus	60	Stadler Flirt (427/428)
RE 97/RB 97	Marburg (Lahn) – Frankenberg (Eder) – Korbach – Brilon Wald – Brilon Stadt	Wega–Korbach–Brilon Wald; Volkmarsen–Korbach–Sarnau	622	Kurhessenbahn	60 (Marburg–Frankenberg), 60–120 (Frankenberg–Brilon) (RE and RB run alternately)	Siemens Desiro Classic (642)
RE 98	Kassel Hbf – Kassel-Wilhelmshöhe – Wabern – Treysa – Marburg (Lahn) – Gießen – Frankfurt (Main)	Kassel–Frankfurt	635	Hessische Landesbahn	120; Treysa–Frankfurt alternating with RE 30	Stadler Flirt (429)

=== RegioTram ===
The three services of the RegioTram Kassel are operated by the Regionalbahn Kassel GmbH (RBK) with two-system vehicles of the RegioCitadis class from Alstom.

They run (except on public holidays) Monday to Friday and Saturday until late afternoon every 30 minutes and on Saturday evenings, Sundays and public holidays every hour.

Line	Route	Lines used	KBS
RT 1	Holländische Straße – Königsplatz – Rathaus/Fünffensterstraße – Kassel Hbf – Hofgeismar-Hümme	Harleshausen Curve; Kassel–Warburg	435
RT 4	Holländische Straße – Königsplatz – Rathaus/Fünffensterstraße – Kassel Hbf – Zierenberg – Wolfhagen (Zierenberg – Wolfhagen only every 60 min and only Mon-Sat)	Harleshausen Curve; Kassel–Volkmarsen	612
RT 5	Auestadion – Rathaus/Fünffensterstraße – Kassel Hbf – Melsungen	Kassel–Frankfurt; Baunatal-Guntershausen–Bebra	610
