= Wolfhagen station =

Railway station in Wolfhagen, Germany

Wolfhagen
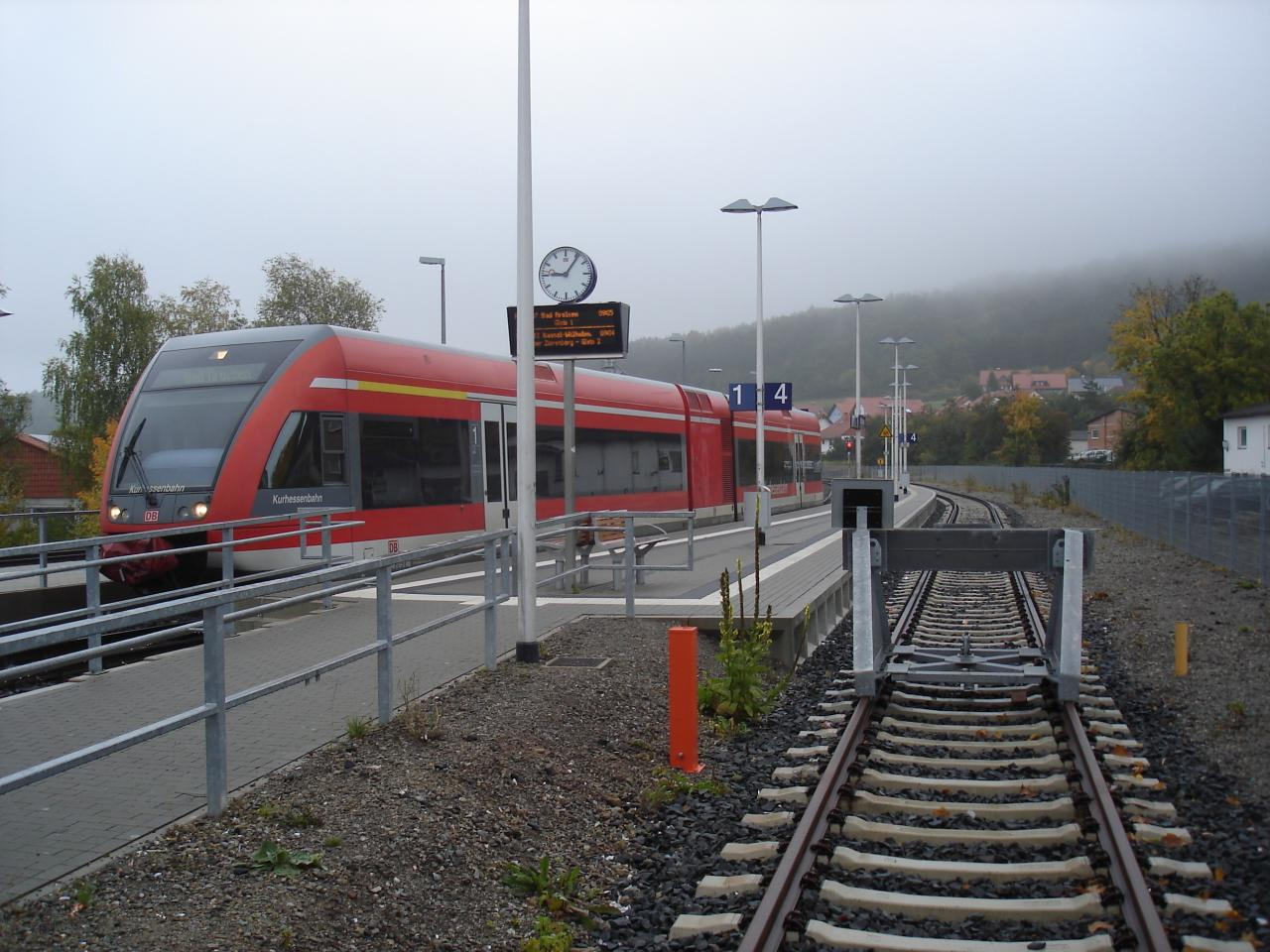
- 2008

General information
- Location: Bahnhofstraße; 34466 Wolfhagen; Hesse; Germany
- Coordinates: 51.3314°N 9.1791°E
- Owner: DB RegioNetz Infrastruktur
- Operator: Kurhessenbahn
- Lines: Volkmarsen–Vellmar-Obervellmar railway (KBS 612)
- Platforms: 1 island platform 1 side platform
- Tracks: 4
- Train operators: Kassel RegioTram; Kurhessenbahn

Other information
- Station code: ?
- DS100 code: FWFH
- IBNR: 8006549
- Category: ?
- Fare zone: NVV: 3280

History
- Opened: 1 September 1897; 128 years ago

Services
Preceding station	Kurhessenbahn	Following station
Ehringen towards Korbach Hbf	RB 4	Zierenberg towards Kassel-Wilhelmshöhe
Preceding station	Kassel RegioTram	Following station
Terminus	4	Altenhasungen towards Kassel Hollandische Straße
Location
- Location within Hesse

Wolfhagen station is a railway station in the municipality of Wolfhagen, located in the Kassel district in Hesse, Germany.
