= Nuttlar–Frankenberg railway =

Railway in North Rhine-Westphalia, Germany

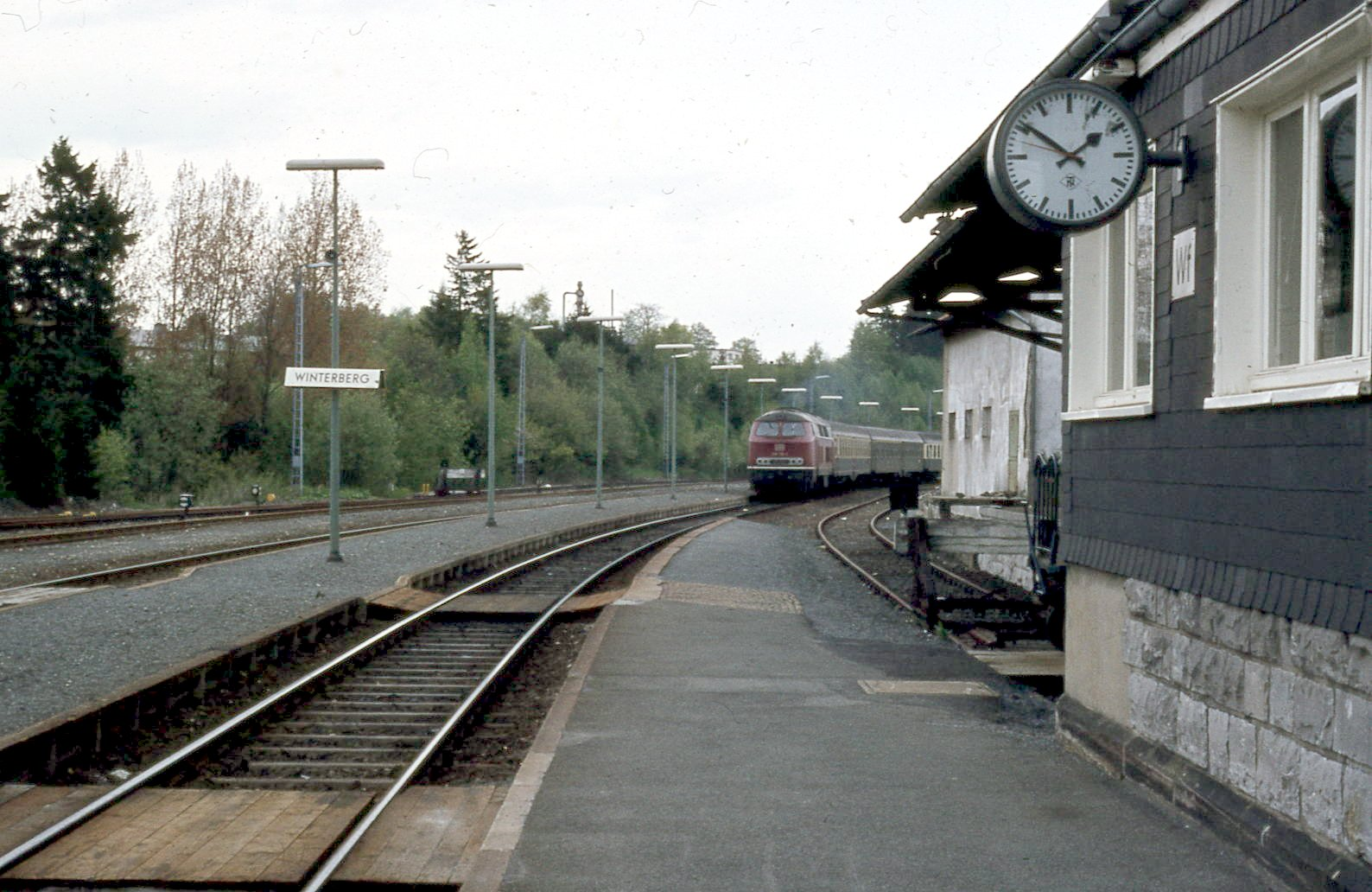
- Winterberg station (1983)

Overview
- Line number: 2854
- Locale: North Rhine-Westphalia, Germany

Service
- Route number: 438

Technical
- Line length: 62.3 km (38.7 mi)
- Track gauge: 1,435 mm (4 ft 8 1/2 in) standard gauge
- Operating speed: 60 km/h (37 mph)
- Maximum incline: 2.5%

The Nuttlar–Frankenberg railway is a 62.3 km long line from Nuttlar on the Upper Ruhr Valley Railway in the German state of North Rhine-Westphalia via Winterberg and Allendorf (Eder) to Frankenberg (Eder) in the state of Hesse.

== History ==
=== Construction ===
The construction of the section from Nuttlar to Winterberg was authorised on 20 May 1898 by a law of the Prussian parliament. The Nuttlar (Westfalen)–Steinhelle section was opened on 1 May 1902. On the same day the first section of the Steinhelle–Medebach Light Railway (German: Kleinbahn Steinhelle-Medebach) was opened. The continuation of the line from Steinhelle to Winterberg was opened on 1 October 1906.

The route to connect with the Hessian rail network was already determined by this time. Numerous engineering structures were required between Winterberg and Bromskirchen, including three tunnels and a viaduct, with a grade of up to 2.5%. The whole line was opened to Frankenberg on 1 December 1908. Frankenberg was connected to the Warburg–Sarnau railway. From 1910/1911 it was possible to continue the journey over the Upper Eder Valley Railway from Allendorf to Bad Berleburg.

=== Operations ===
In addition to extensive passenger services, freight traffic was handled on the line. In addition to the stations at the ends of the line there were eleven stations and five halts (Haltepunkte). Several pairs of trains ran over the whole line each day. Special trains often ran between the Ruhr area and Winterberg for winter sports traffic.

Operations incurred growing deficits in the 1960s, especially on the middle section. Since there was only minimal investment on the line, this eventually led to the closing of passenger services between Winterberg and Allendorf for safety reasons and freight traffic between Hallenberg and Allendorf on 14 November 1966. This section was shut down on 28 May 1967 and subsequently dismantled. The line between Frankenberg and Allendorf was still used until 1981 for services continuing to Bad Berleburg. On 30 May 1992, the transport of freight between Winterberg and Hallenberg was also closed and the section was dismantled, so the operation of winter sports services from Winterberg to Hallenberg was no longer possible.

The tracks have been removed on the section between Winterberg and Allendorf. The Winterberg Tunnel 1 has been demolished and the Winterberg Tunnel 2 is closed. A cycle path has run through the Bromskirchen Tunnel since mid-2006.

== Rail services ==
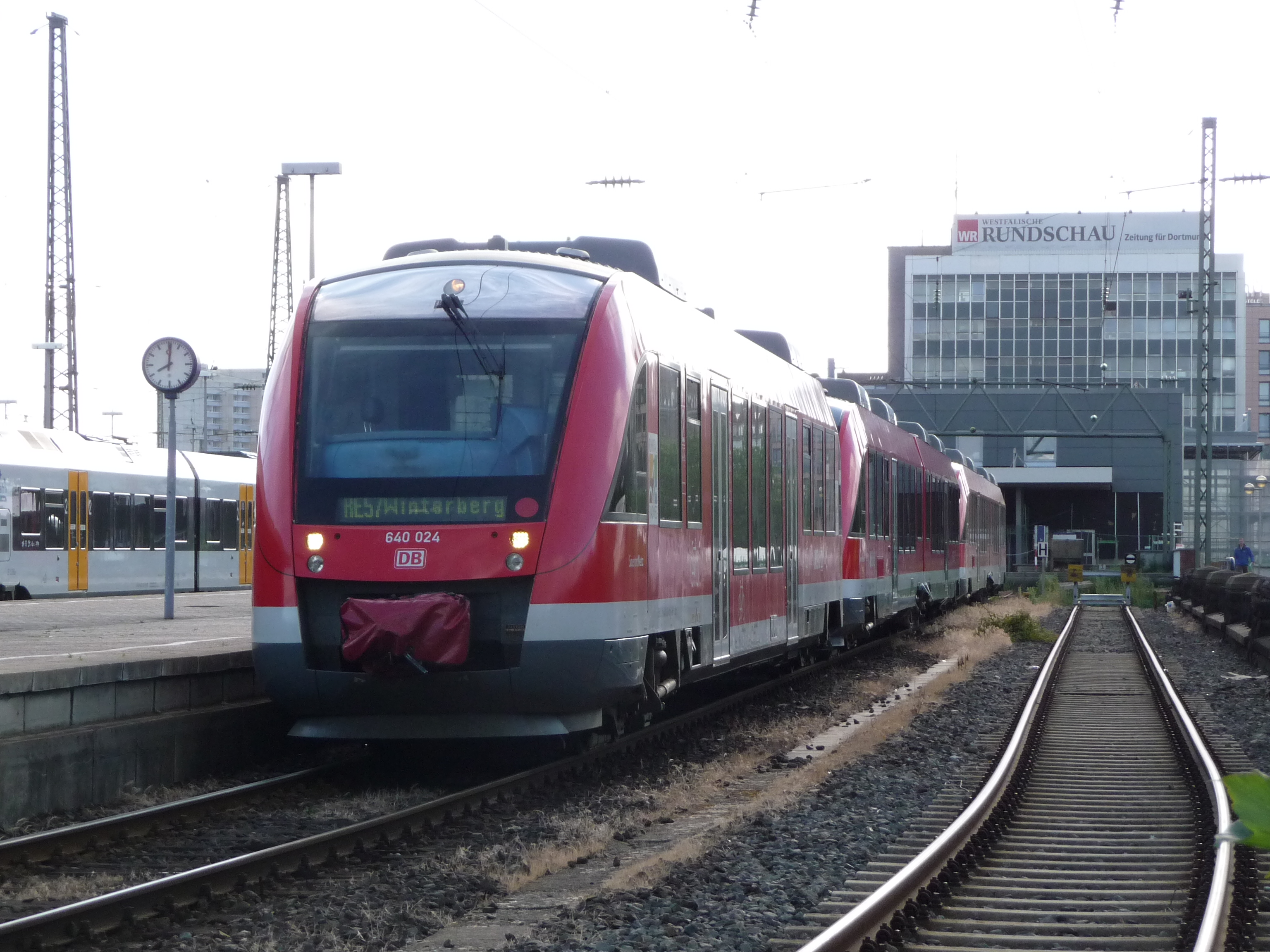
RE to Winterberg in Dortmund Hbf

Regional-Express service RE 57 (Dortmund-Sauerland-Express) from/to Dortmund runs between Bestwig and Winterberg every two hours, and hourly on weekends, operated with Alstom Coradia LINT 41 (class 648) diesel rail cars, partly in multiple, often mixed with LINT 27 (class 640) rail cars. It also stops in Siedlinghausen and when required in Silbach and Bigge.

There are generally no passenger services on the remaining section from Frankenberg to Allendorf (continuing to Battenberg (Eder) and Auhammer on the Upper Eder Valley Railway) since the services that existed on summer weekends up to 2005 had been abandoned. This service was aimed mainly at cyclists and hikers. Since then, passenger services have been only operated sporadically, mostly at various events such as the Eder-Bike-Tour. Freight traffic continues on the remaining two sections.
