= Korbach Hauptbahnhof =

Railway station in Korbach, Germany

Korbach Hbf
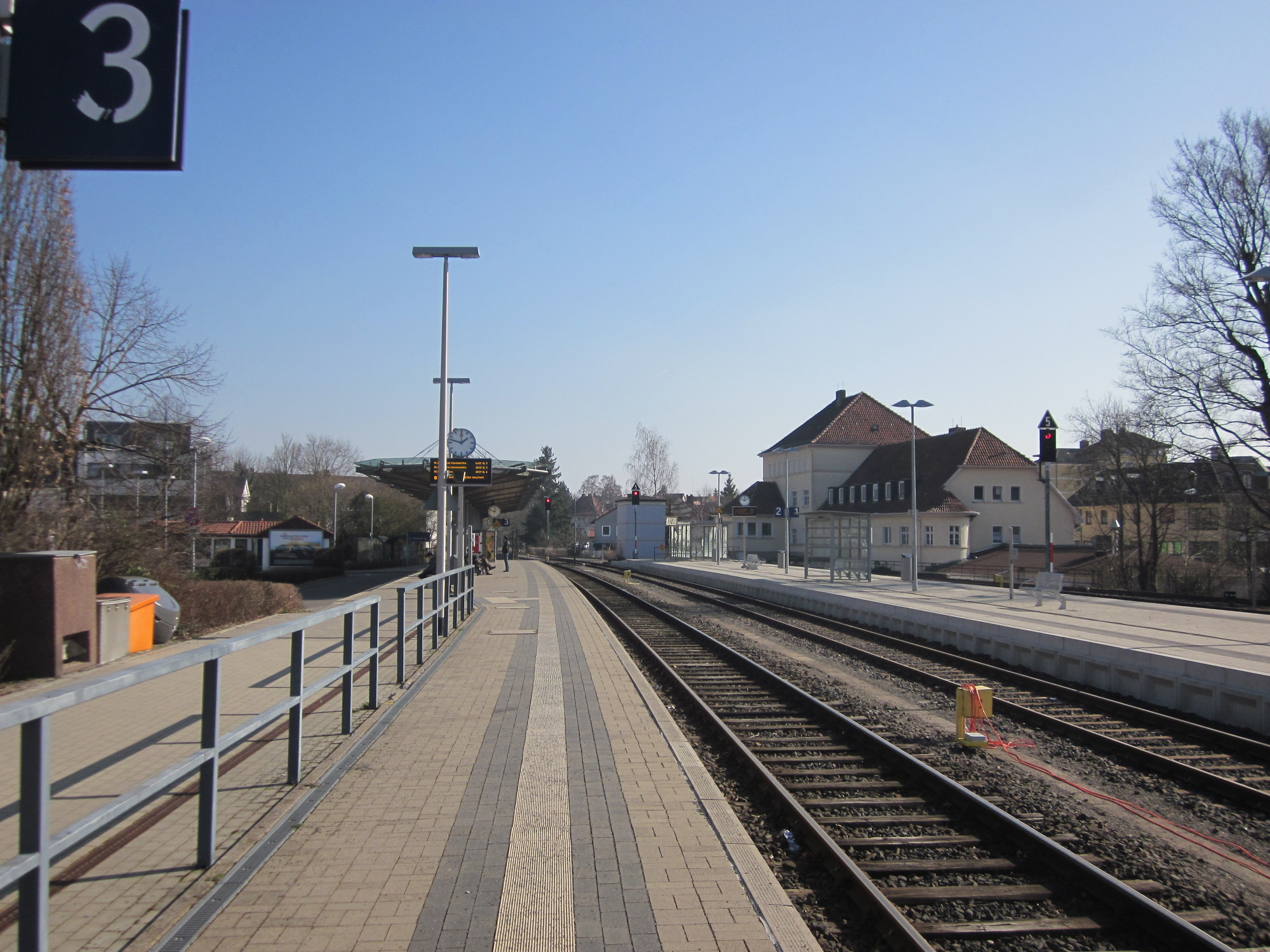
- 2014

General information
- Location: Am Hauptbahnhof; 34497 Korbach; Hesse; Germany
- Coordinates: 51.2785°N 8.8730°E
- Elevation: 372 m (1,220 ft)
- Owner: DB RegioNetz Infrastruktur
- Operator: Kurhessenbahn
- Lines: Burgwald Railway (KBS 622); Upper Lahn Valley Railway (KBS 623)
- Platforms: 1 island platform 1 side platform
- Tracks: 4
- Train operators: Kurhessenbahn

Other information
- Station code: ?
- DS100 code: FKOB
- IBNR: 8000210
- Category: 6
- Fare zone: NVV: 5151; : 8530 (NVV transitional tariff)

History
- Opened: 15 August 1893; 133 years ago

Services
Preceding station	Kurhessenbahn	Following station
Terminus	RB 4	Twiste towards Kassel-Wilhelmshöhe
Usseln towards Brilon Stadt	RB 97	Korbach Süd towards Marburg (Lahn)
Location
- Location within Hesse

Korbach Hauptbahnhof is a railway station in the municipality of Korbach, located in the Waldeck-Frankenberg district in Hesse, Germany. It was renamed Hauptbahnhof (main station) in December 2018.
