= Münchhausen am Christenberg =

Münchhausen
- Municipality
- Coat of arms

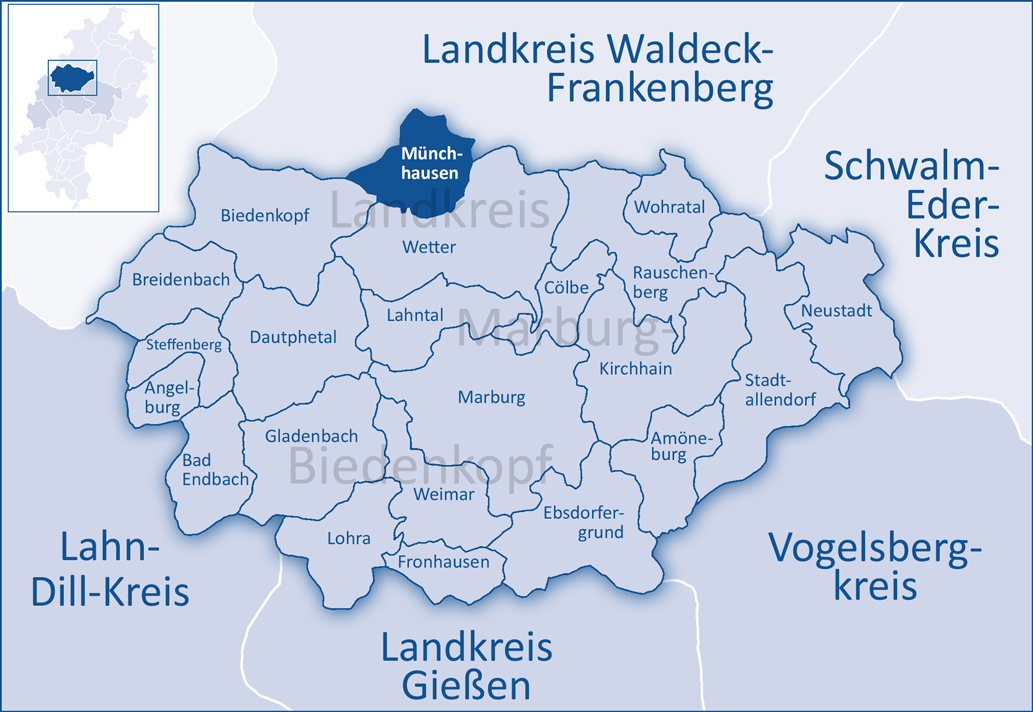
- Location of Münchhausen within Marburg-Biedenkopf district
- Interactive map of Münchhausen
- Location within Germany Location within Hesse
- Coordinates: 50°57′N 8°43′E
- Country: Germany
- State: Hesse
- Admin. region: Gießen
- District: Marburg-Biedenkopf
- Subdivisions: 5 Ortsteile

Government
  - Mayor (2022–28): Holger Siemon (Ind.)

Area
  - Total: 41.54 km^{2} (16.04 sq mi)
- Elevation: 284 m (932 ft)

Population (2025-12-31)
  - Total: 3,267
  - Density: 78.65/km^{2} (203.7/sq mi)
- Time zone: UTC+01:00 (CET)
  - Summer (DST): UTC+02:00 (CEST)
- Postal codes: 35117
- Dialling codes: 06423 06452 06457
- Vehicle registration: MR
- Website: www.gemeinde-muenchhausen.de

The municipality of Münchhausen (German pronunciation: [ˈmʏnçˌhaʊzn̩]) is found 20 km (12 mi) north of Marburg on the northern edge of Marburg-Biedenkopf district. It has 3,286 inhabitants (2020) and has had its current boundaries since 1974. The municipality's area is roughly 41 km².

== Geography ==
=== Location ===
West of the municipality lies the Rothaargebirge, a low mountain range. The municipal area is bounded on the east by the Burgwald, another low mountain range. The constituent municipalities of Münchhausen and Simtshausen lie in the Wetschaft valley. Wollmar lies on the like-named river Wollmar, which empties into the Wetschaft in Münchhausen. Through the constituent municipalities of Oberasphe and Niederasphe flows the river Asphe.

=== Neighbouring municipalities ===
Münchhausen's neighbours are Burgwald, Rosenthal, Wetter, Biedenkopf and Battenberg.

=== Constituent municipalities ===
- Münchhausen (1,285 inhabitants) (as of January 2004)
- Niederasphe (914 inhabitants)
- Oberasphe (356 inhabitants)
- Simtshausen (495 inhabitants)
- Wollmar (701 inhabitants)

== History ==
Münchhausen am Christenberg officially came into being on 1 July 1974 when the formerly independent places of Münchhausen, Simtshausen, Niederasphe, Oberasphe and Wollmar were united.

== Politics ==
=== Municipal representation ===
Results of municipal election on 26 March 2006:

- CDU 11
- SPD 10
- Independent Green List (UGL) 2

=== Coat of arms ===
The civic coat of arms might be described thus: Party per chevron; above in gules a cross argent fused with the chevron; below in argent, a five-spoked wheel sable.

The coat of arms symbolizes the nearby mountain, the Christenberg, with its mediaeval church. The wheel with its five spokes stands for Münchhausen's five constituent municipalities.

== Personalities ==
- Euricius Cordus, German humanist
