= Burgwald =

- Municipality
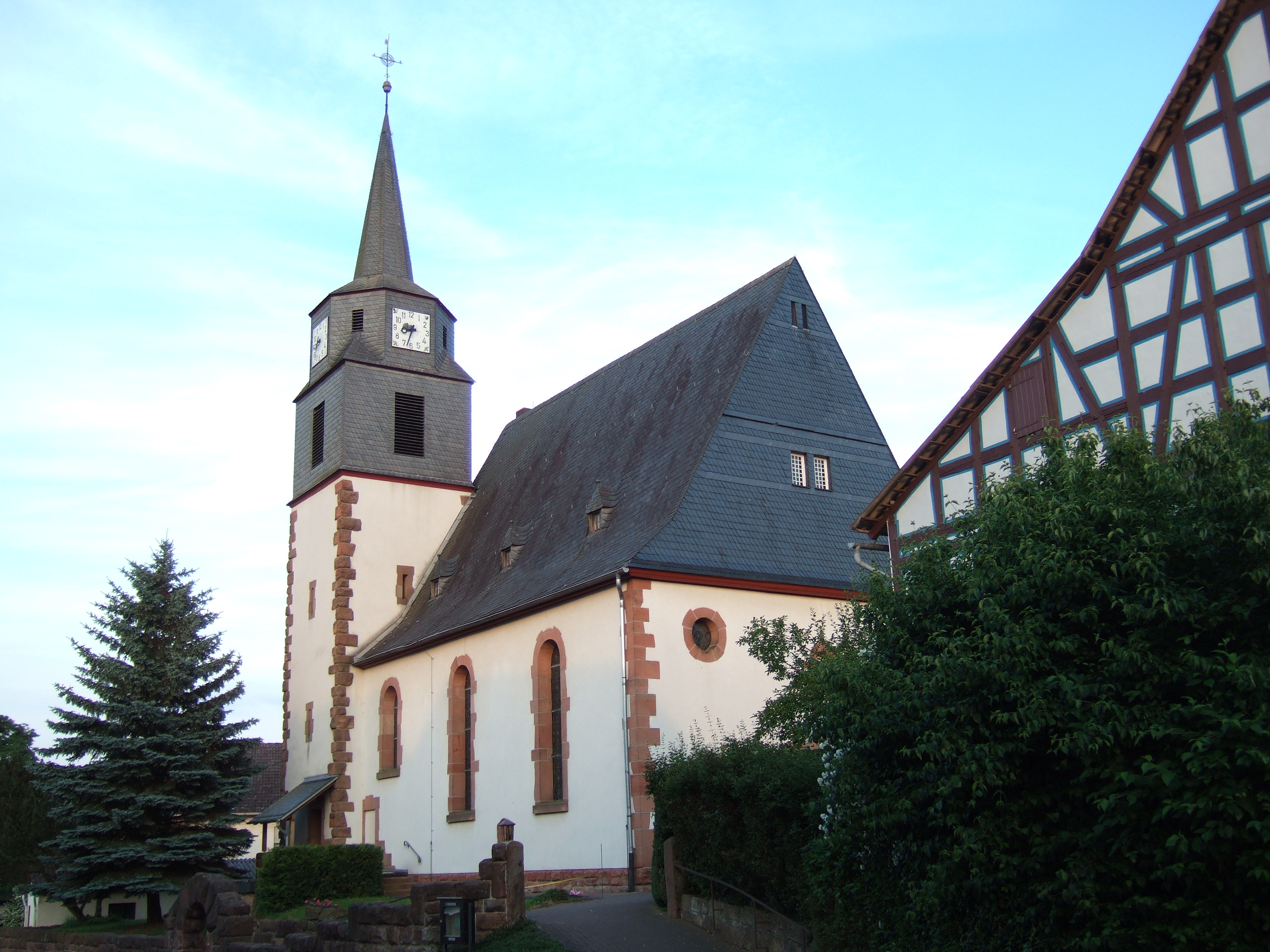
- Protestant Church

- Coat of arms

- Location of Burgwald within Waldeck-Frankenberg district
- Interactive map of Burgwald
- Location within Germany Location within Hesse
- Coordinates: 51°00′N 08°45′E
- Country: Germany
- State: Hesse
- Admin. region: Kassel
- District: Waldeck-Frankenberg
- Subdivisions: 5 Ortsteile

Government
  - Mayor (2020–26): Lothar Koch (Ind.)

Area
  - Total: 41.3 km^{2} (15.9 sq mi)
- Elevation: 250–400 m (820–1,310 ft)

Population (2025-12-31)
  - Total: 4,917
  - Density: 119/km^{2} (308/sq mi)
- Time zone: UTC+01:00 (CET)
  - Summer (DST): UTC+02:00 (CEST)
- Postal codes: 35099
- Dialling codes: 06451 / 06457
- Vehicle registration: KB
- Website: www.burgwald.de

Burgwald (German pronunciation: [ˈbʊʁkˌvalt]) is a municipality in Waldeck-Frankenberg in Hesse, Germany.

== Geography ==
=== Location ===
Burgwald lies east of Battenberg and roughly 30 km north of the university town of Marburg. The municipality lies on the northwestern edge of the Burgwald range, Hesse's biggest contiguous woodland.

=== Neighbouring municipalities ===
Burgwald borders in the north on the town of Frankenberg, in the east on the municipality of Haina, in the south on the town of Rosenthal (all in Waldeck-Frankenberg), in the southwest on the municipality of Münchhausen (Marburg-Biedenkopf), and in the west on the town of Battenberg and the municipality of Allendorf (both in Waldeck-Frankenberg).

=== Constituent municipalities ===
The municipality is divided into Birkenbringhausen in the northwest, Bottendorf somewhat more towards the northeast, Burgwald and Wiesenfeld towards the centre, and Ernsthausen to the south.

== History ==
Burgwald is quite a new name for the main municipality. Until 1996, it was known as Industriehof.

=== Amalgamations ===
As part of Hesse's municipal reforms on 1 July 1971, the municipalities of Birkenbringhausen, Ernsthausen and Wiesenfeld merged to form the greater municipality. On 1 January 1974, Bottendorf was amalgamated with Burgwald as well.

== Politics ==
=== Municipal council ===
The council's 27 seats are apportioned thus, in accordance with municipal elections held on 26 March 2006 (each party's share of the vote is also shown, and figures in parentheses are for the 2001 election):

- CDU: 3 seats; 12.8% (5 seats; 17.0%)
- SPD: 6 seats; 23.9% (10 seats; 31.4%)
- Greens: 0 seats; 0.6% (0 seats; 0.0%)
- FWG - Freie Wählergemeinschaft Birkenbringhausen: 5 seats; 17.2% (5 seats; 15.5%)
- BLE - Bürgerliste Ernsthausen: 6 seats; 21.3% (5 seats; 17.4)
- BLB - Bürgerliste Burgwald: 3 seats; 10.8% (2 seats; 6.8%)
- WGBo - Wählergemeinschaft Bottendorf: 4 seats; 13.4% (4 seats; 11.9%)

Note: The last three are citizens' coalitions.

=== Coat of arms ===
Burgwald's civic coat of arms has some unusual divisions. The crenellated wall and the line of fir trees are, as the German blazon describes them, not charges, but rather divisions of the shield, although most observers would see a castle wall and a line of trees (things, rather than dividing lines). According to the blazon, the only charge is the cross of the Order of St. John in the shield's lowest division.

The shield's colours are blue, green and silver – blue for the sky, silver for a castle's battlements and the cross, and green for the treetops. The battlements refer to the Kesterburg (now called the Christenberg), a castle in the Burgwald range. The cross refers to local history, namely Wiesenfeld's. In 1238, this village was founded as a prospective Order of St. John centre.

=== Partnerships ===
- Perbál, near Budapest, Hungary

== Economy and infrastructure ==
=== Transport ===
Through the municipality runs Federal Highway (Bundesstraße) B 252 connecting Marburg and Korbach.

Birkenbringhausen, Wiesenfeld and Ernsthausen are stops on the Burgwaldbahn railway line from Frankenberg to Marburg. The stations in Burgwald are in the tariff zone of the North Hesse Transport Association (Nordhessischer Verkehrsverbund; NVV).

Several signposted bicycle paths cross the municipal area or lead right to it. West past Birkenbringhausen run the Hessian cycle path R8 and the Ederauenweg ("Eder floodplain way"), which runs alongside the Eder from its source in the Rothaargebirge to its mouth where it empties into the Fulda. East of Bottendorf, the Hessian cycle path R6 runs through the Burgwald range. The Lahn-Eder cycle path, running from Marburg to Frankenberg reaches the former district seat of Frankenberg from Ernsthausen in the south by way of the Bottendorf area.

== Literature ==
- Ulrich Stöhr, Reinhold Briel, Johannes Briel (2003): Ernsthausen 1303–2003. Chronik zur 700-Jahr-Feier. Published by the municipality of Burgwald. Burgwald-Ernsthausen

== Established businesses ==
- OSBORN International GmbH, manufacturer of technical brushes and tools for finishing surfaces.
