= Kurhessenbahn =

German regional train network

Logo of the Kurhessenbahn.

The Kassel-based Kurhessenbahn (KHB) is the first of six regional networks to be created by Deutsche Bahn AG as part of its middle class offensive. It forms a unit that is formally split into DB RegioNetz Verkehrs GmbH and DB RegioNetz Infrastruktur GmbH in order to comply with the legal requirements after separation of network and operations.

The aim is to maintain low capacity utilisation by changing the organisational structure and local activities in the long term.

== Financial figures ==
The Kurhessenbahn has a total of 65 stations (50 of its own) on a 275-kilometre network of five lines. 25 diesel railcars travel 2.5 million train kilometers (140 trains per day) and carry 6,500 passengers per day. This service is provided by 208 employees. The Kurhessenbahn also has a DB Class 218 diesel locomotive for freight and special transports. This is mainly used in timber traffic, which originates from the Breidenstein loading station at the Scheldetalbahn, which was established in 2007.

== History ==
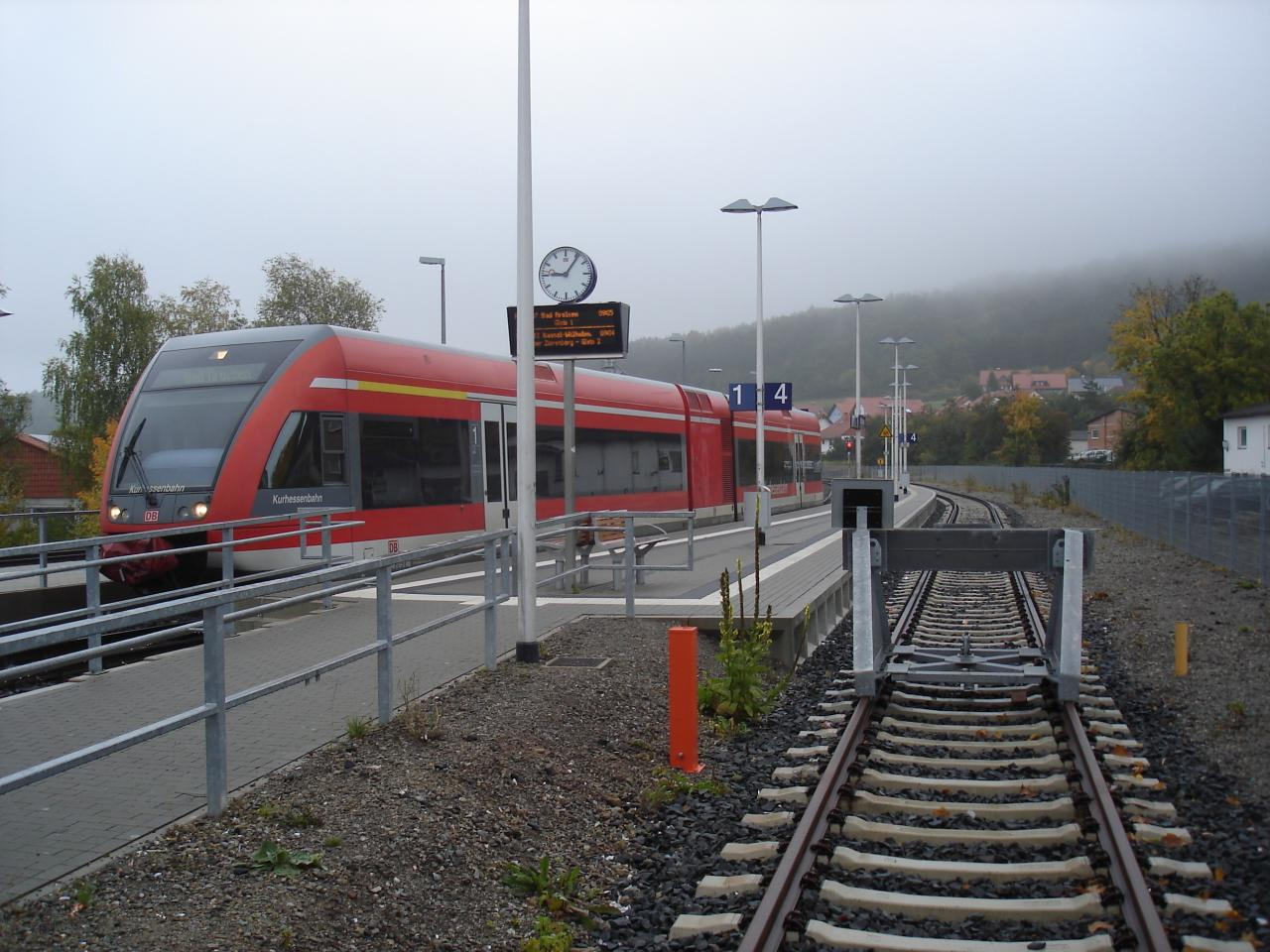
Wolfhagen station of Kurhessenbahn.

The company was launched on 7 December 2000 as the first regional network and founded in early September 2002 as DB RegioNetz Verkehrs GmbH / Infrastruktur GmbH Kurhessenbahn. The Kurhessenbahn has leased several branch lines in Hesse and North Rhine-Westphalia from DB Netz AG for a period of twenty years from 1 January 2002. At the same time, a long-term transport contract was concluded with the responsible authorities. This included the operation of the local transport lines Brilon Wald-Korbach, Kassel-Korbach, Marburg-Frankenberg and Marburg-Erndtebrück. A special feature was the Wabern-Bad Wildungen line, which was operated by the Hessische Landesbahn between 1998 and 2008 and therefore could not fulfil the synergy effects between network and operation, which was highlighted by those responsible.

At the end of 2003, the Willingen-Korbach section of the line, which was closed for four years due to dilapidated viaducts, was put back into operation. At the same time, the line was comprehensively rehabilitated and the top speed increased, reducing the travel time between Korbach and Brilon Wald by 13 minutes. In 2006, the Kassel-Korbach line was closed for several months and rehabilitated and upgraded for the operation of the Kassel RegioTram. From December 2006, the regional railway in the Kassel-Wolfhagen section was replaced by the Kassel RegioTram RT4 line with two-power railcars, whereby a second external transport company operates local transport services on the Kurhessenbahn network. Since then, the Kurhessenbahn has only operated the regional express trains between Kassel and Korbach.

At the same time, free-cutting work began in 2005 in the Frankenberg-Herzhausen section to reactivate the section of line. With the financial support of the Waldeck-Frankenberg district, excursion traffic was introduced every two hours on Sundays and public holidays in the Herzhausen-Frankenberg-Battenberg (Eder) section from 2005. This traffic should be a precursor to the planned closure of the gap between Korbach and Frankenberg. However, an expert opinion in 2007 showed that closing the gap in the form planned at that time did not make economic sense. The Nordhessischer Verkehrsverbund (NVV) then made use of its right of withdrawal in the implementation contract and the Waldeck-Frankenberg district cancelled its financial participation in the excursion traffic, to which it was suspended. At this time, plans envisaged investments of 43 million euros to close the gap and accelerate the Cölbe-Korbach route. Subsequently, a slimmed-down variant was developed, which provides for only one two-hour cycle instead of one hour and no more acceleration measures. An economic benefit could be determined for this variant.

In a tender procedure of the Nordhessischer Verkehrsverbund (NVV) the Kurhessenbahn was able to secure the operation of the line (Kassel -)Wabern-Bad Wildungen (17 km). The line was taken over by Hessische Landesbahn, which had previously operated the line for ten years, with the 2008/2009 timetable change in December 2008.

In 2010, work began on the rehabilitation of the Marburg-Frankenberg section. The stops and the route infrastructure were modernized and the signalling was converted to an ESTW.

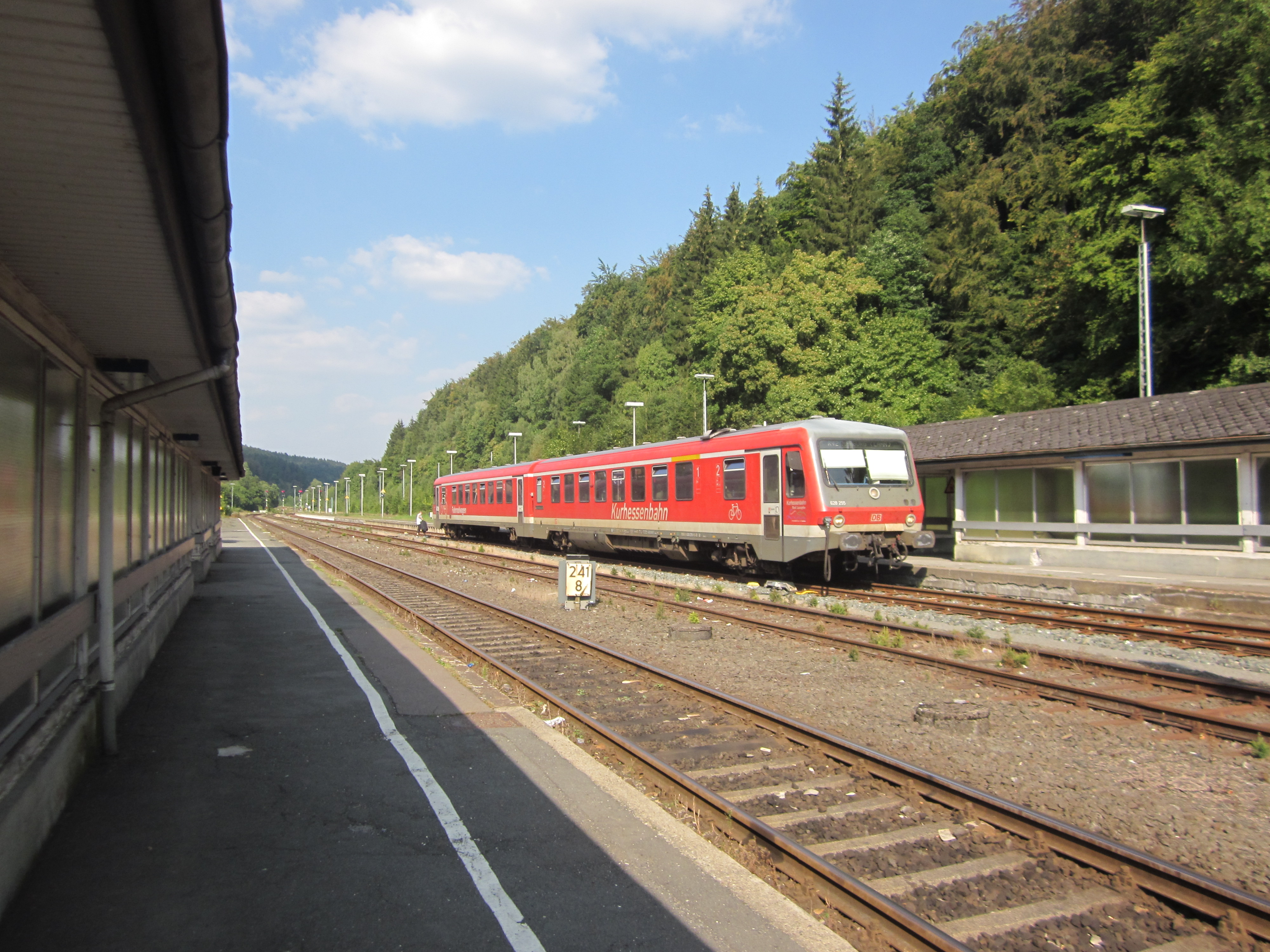
628.2 of Kurhessenbahn on the way from Bestwig to Marburg at Brilon Wald station.

After years of political debate, it was finally decided in September 2012 that the entire Frankenberg (Eder)-Korbach route would again be served by passenger services from December 2014. The reopening was officially celebrated on 14 September 2015 with a track festival with historical and modern vehicles. Since then, traffic has been offered every 2 hours. In addition, continuous connections from Brilon Stadt or Bestwig to Marburg are again offered.

With the timetable change 2015/2016 in December 2015, a new timetable concept was introduced on the Main–Weser Railway in the Kassel-Treysa section, which extended most journeys on the Wabern-Bad Wildungen line to Kassel and ordered additional journeys to Treysa from the Kurhessenbahn during peak traffic hours.

In March 2016, the Kurhessenbahn won the tender for the Northwest Hesse diesel network and will thus operate its existing network for another 15 years from December 2017. The operation will be completely converted to use Stadler GTW (number: 13) and Siemens Desiro (number: 14) low-floor multiple units. As part of the new transport contract, vehicle maintenance is transferred to Korbach, where the foundation stone for the new workshop was laid on 29 September 2017.

== Rolling stock ==
- 16x DB Class 628
- 9x DBAG Class 646
- 1x DB Class 218

== Vehicle naming ==
Kurhessenbahn baptized the following vehicles to communities and towns:

- VT 646.205 Stadt Wolfhagen
- VT 646.206 Stadt Korbach
- VT 646.207 Gemeinde Ahnatal
- VT 646.208 Gemeinde Calden
- VT 646.210 Stadt Volkmarsen
- VT 646.211 Stadt Frankenberg (Eder)
- VT 646.212 Gemeinde Willingen
- VT 646.213 Gemeinde Zierenberg
- VT 628.223 Gemeinde Burgwald
- VT 628.250 Region Burgwald Ederbergland
- VT 628.255 Stadt Bad Laasphe
