= Kirchhain (Bz Kassel) station =

Railway station in Kirchhain, Germany

Kirchhain (Bz Kassel)
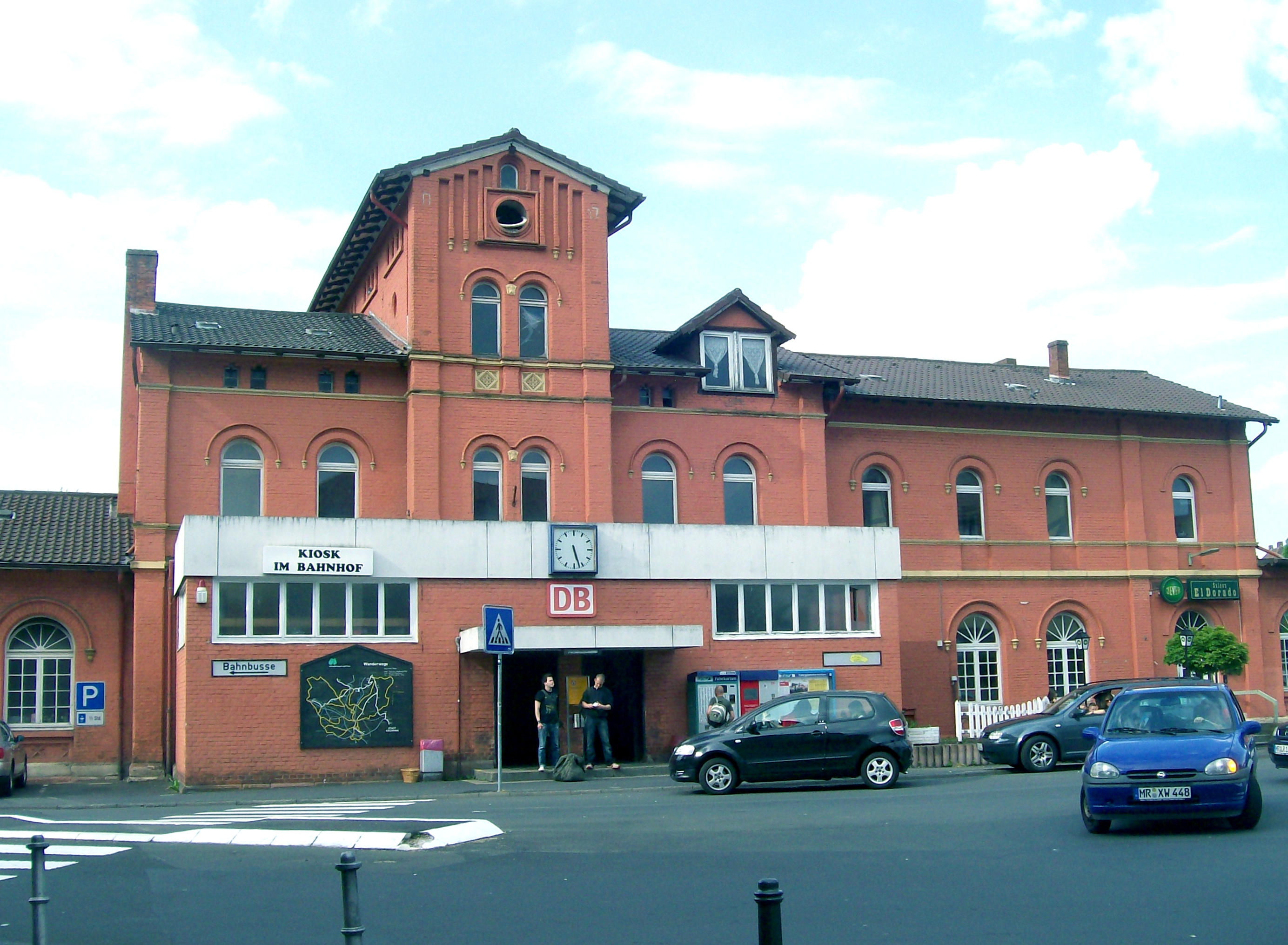
- Entrance building from the street side

General information
- Location: Am Bahnhof 9, Kirchhain, Hesse; Germany
- Coordinates: 50°49′26″N 8°55′17″E
- Lines: Main-Weser Railway (89.2 km); Wohra Valley Railway (0.0 km) (closed); Ohm Valley Railway (20.1 km)
- Platforms: 3

Construction
- Accessible: Yes
- Architect: Julius Eugen Ruhl
- Architectural style: Neoclassical

Other information
- Station code: 3191
- DS100 code: FKIH
- IBNR: 8000435
- Category: 4
- Fare zone: : 0326
- Website: www.bahnhof.de

History
- Opened: 4 March 1850

Services
Preceding station	DB Regio Mitte	Following station
Stadtallendorf towards Kassel Hbf	RE 30	Marburg towards Frankfurt (Main) Hbf
Preceding station	Hessische Landesbahn	Following station
Stadtallendorf towards Treysa or Stadtallendorf	RB 41	Anzefahr towards Frankfurt (Main) Hbf
Stadtallendorf towards Kassel Hbf	RE 98	Marburg (Lahn) towards Frankfurt (Main) Hbf
Location

Kirchhain (Bz Kassel) station is a through station at the 89.2 km mark on the Main-Weser Railway. It is located very centrally in the centre of the town of Kirchhain in the German state of Hesse. Formerly, the station was the starting point of the Ohm Valley Railway (German: Ohmtalbahn) to Burg- und Nieder-Gemünden and the Wohra Valley Railway (Wohratalbahn) to Gemünden (Wohra). The station is classified by Deutsche Bahn (DB) as a category 4 station.

== History ==
The station was opened along with the Main-Weser Railway on 4 March 1850 under the name of Kirchhain (Bz Kassel). The continuous connection from Kassel to Frankfurt was opened on 15 May 1852. Before then trains only ran between Kassel and Giessen.

The northern section of the Ohm Valley Railway (Kirchhain–Nieder-Ofleiden) was opened as the Kirchhain District Railway (Kirchhainer Kreisbahn) by the Prussian state railways on 1 April 1900. Exactly one year later, it was extended to Burg- und Nieder-Gemünden station on the Prussian state railway's Gießen–Fulda line (Vogelsberg Railway, Vogelsbergbahn). Passenger services on the Ohm Valley Railway were abandoned on 31 May 1980. The line was closed between Nieder-Ofleiden and Burg- und Nieder-Gemünden on 28 September 1991 and finally dismantled in 1999. Freight and special passenger services continue between Kirchhain and Nieder-Ofleiden. Reactivation of the whole line between Kirchhain and Burg- und Nieder-Gemünden is under discussion.

On 1 May 1914, the Wohra Valley Railway was opened to Gemünden via Rauschenberg. As at 28 May 1972, passenger services, which had fallen sharply, were abandoned altogether. Freight traffic has not operated on the line since 19 December 1981. On 31 December 1981, the entire Wohra Valley Railway was reduced to a 200 m long section in Kirchhain, which is now used as a siding.

== Infrastructure ==
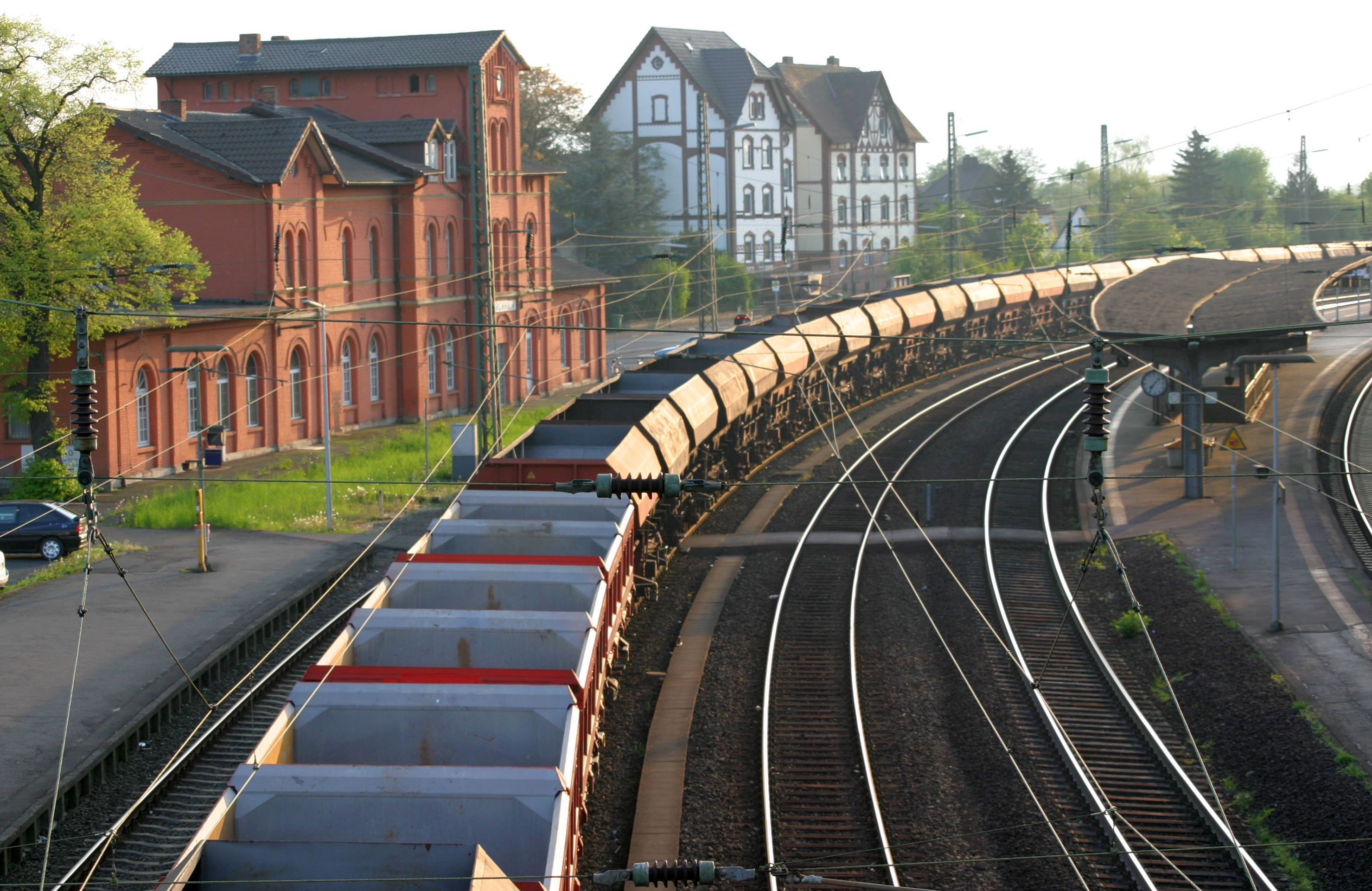
Empty gravel train on track 4 (2004)

Kirchhain station now has an island platform with two platform tracks opposite the entrance building, two crossing loops without a platform and a “house” platform (next to the entrance building), which is only used for a morning shuttle service to Giessen and occasional special trains on the Ohm Valley Railway. On both sides of the entrance building there are park and ride spaces.

=== Entrance building ===
The entrance building of Kirchhain station was built in 1849 as a station and administration building of the Hessian State Railways. The symmetrical three-storey central section has two-storey wings with gabled roofs, which have the roof ridges running parallel (traufständig) with the tracks. The building has Rundbogenstil (round arch style) brick framing and terracotta ornaments. The originally symmetrical main building was extended to the east as a two-storey building. Single-storey extensions were added around 1900. The Neoclassical building was designed by the Kassel court architect Julius Eugen Ruhl and is a heritage-listed building.

== Operations ==
The station is located in the area administered by the Rhine-Main Transport Association (Rhein-Main-Verkehrsverbund, RMV) and is served at hourly intervals by the Mittelhessen-Express (RB 41) between Treysa and Frankfurt. In Giessen, it is coupled with a section of the Mittelhessen-Express (RB 40) running from Dillenburg. Furthermore, there are direct Regional-Express services (RE 30) every two hours between Frankfurt and Kassel.

Line	Route	Frequency
RE 30	Frankfurt – Friedberg – Gießen – Marburg – Kirchhain – Treysa – Wabern – Kassel-Wilhelmshöhe – Kassel Hbf	120 mins
RE 98 (Main-Sieg-Express)	Frankfurt – Friedberg – Gießen – Marburg – Kirchhain – Treysa – Wabern – Kassel-Wilhelmshöhe – Kassel Hbf	120 mins
RB 41 (Mittelhessen-Express)	Frankfurt – Friedberg – Butzbach – Gießen – Niederwalgern – Marburg – Cölbe – Kirchhain – Stadtallendorf – Neustadt – Treysa	60 min (weekdays); 60 min (weekdays); 120 min (Stadtallendorf – Treysa)

Outside the station there is a bus station with connections to the villages around Kirchhain, including those which are no longer served by the Ohm Valley Railway.
