= Stadtallendorf station =

Through station at the Main-Weser Railway in Stadtallendorf, Germany

Stadtallendorf
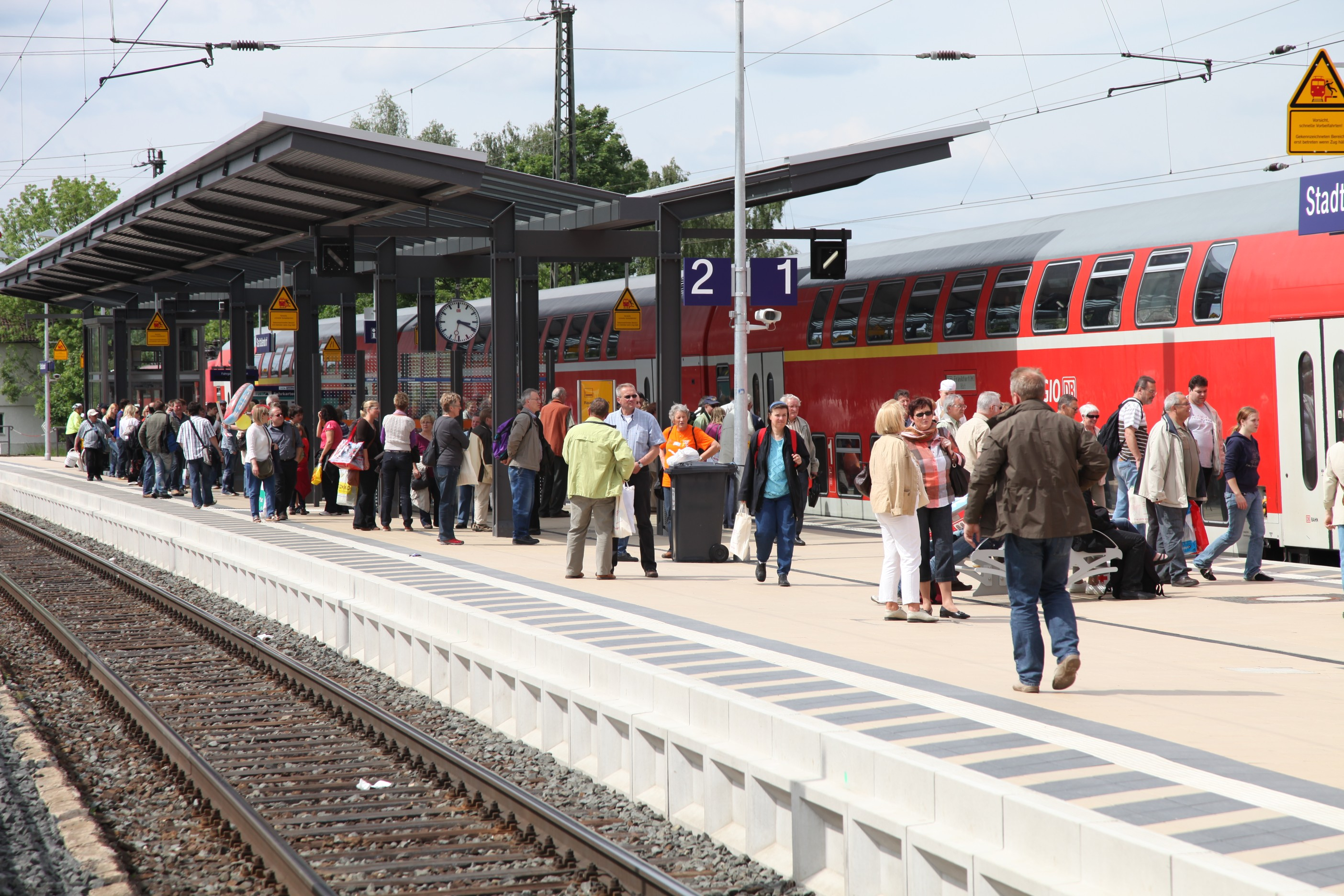
- The platforms in the summer of 2010

General information
- Location: Am Bahnhof 1a Stadtallendorf, Hesse; Germany
- Coordinates: 50°49′30″N 9°0′55″E
- Owner: DB Netz
- Operator: DB Station&Service
- Lines: Main–Weser Railway (82.1 km) (KBS 620)
- Platforms: 3

Construction
- Accessible: Not platform 3

Other information
- Station code: 5953
- DS100 code: FSTA
- IBNR: 8005661
- Category: 4
- Fare zone: : 0301
- Website: www.bahnhof.de

History
- Opened: 1850

Passengers
- 1500

Services
Preceding station	DB Regio Mitte	Following station
Neustadt (Kr Marburg) towards Kassel Hbf	RE 30	Kirchhain towards Frankfurt (Main) Hbf
Preceding station	Hessische Landesbahn	Following station
Neustadt (Kr Marburg) towards Frankfurt (Main) Hbf	RB 41	Kirchhain towards Treysa
Neustadt (Kr Marburg) towards Kassel Hbf	RE 98	Kirchhain towards Frankfurt (Main) Hbf
Location
- Location within Hesse

Stadtallendorf station is a through station at the 82.1 km mark of the Main-Weser Railway in the town of Stadtallendorf in the German state of Hesse. The station is classified by Deutsche Bahn (DB) as a category 4 station. The platforms, underpass and the area around the station were modernised and redecorated in preparation for the Hessentag (Hesse Day) celebrations of 2010.

== History ==
The station was opened along with the Main-Weser Railway in 1850 as Haltepunkt Allendorf (Allendorf halt). This consisted of a gatehouse and two 100 metre long platforms. In 1904, a 600 meter long passing loop was built, the platforms were extended, and it was reclassified as a station. In addition, two platform tracks, a freight shed, loading ramps and a loading road were built. A short time later, in 1908, the station building was opened and a second passing loop was built in the First World War. By 1934, the loading facilities were expanded and the rail tracks were rebuilt.

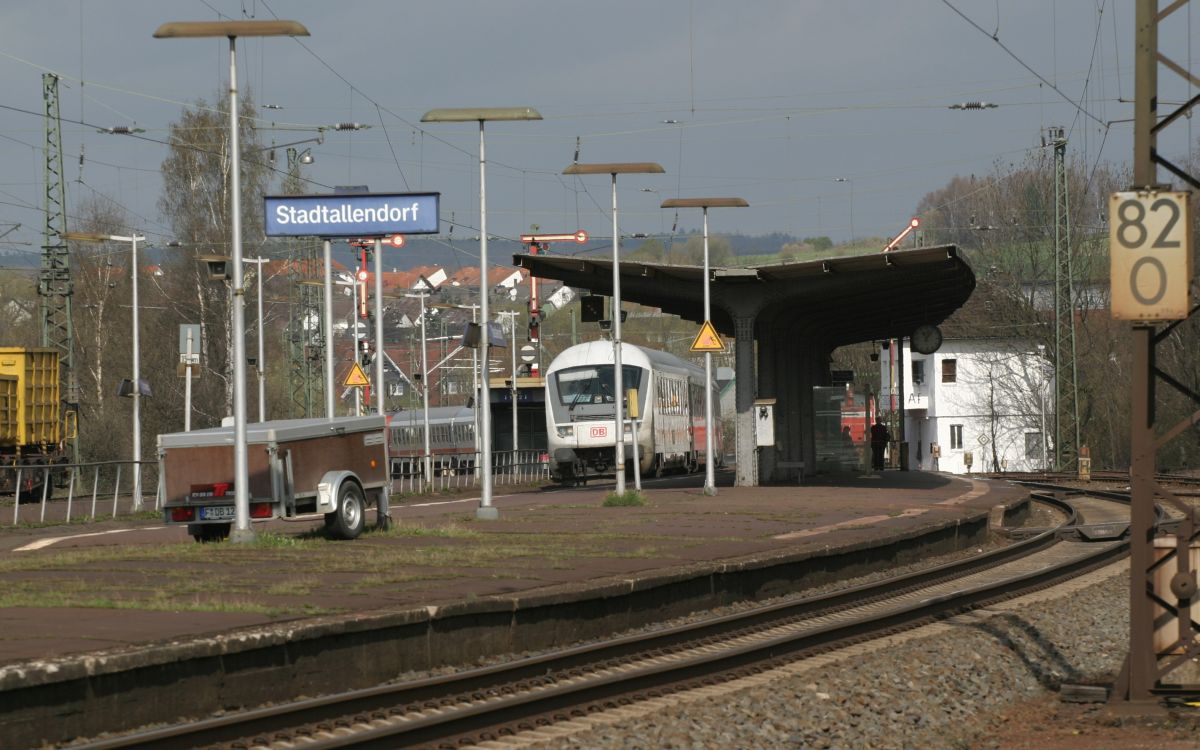
The platforms with a moving InterCity train (2008)

During the Second World War the Allendorf explosives factories of Dynamit Nobel and WASAG were built and they were connected to the station with a total of 39 kilometres of track and 97 sets of points. As a result, the station was greatly expanded (ten new tracks) and provided with two signal boxes. In addition, the level crossing was removed and replaced by a pedestrian underpass, which still exists. In 1942, a connecting track was opened to the Kirtorf airfield, but this was closed in 1947. After the war, production was stopped in the explosives factories and the damaged rail wagons were scrapped. The sidings continued to be used (and sometimes they still are) by local companies and the Herrenwald barracks.

In 1959, the station was served by two express and 31 ordinary passenger trains a day. 106,000 tickets were sold in the same year. After 1961, the superstructure of the railway sidings was renewed and their operations, which were previously operated by Aufbaugesellschaft Allendorf, were then taken over by Deutsche Bundesbahn. Then, in 1964 the tracks in the station area were electrified and a modern waiting hall with a ticket office was installed in the entrance building. Electrical operations began in 1966, and a year later a complete renovation of the entrance building began. In 1969, 145,000 tickets were sold. With the reorganisation of freight operations, the station managed general freight operations at Neustadt and twelve other places. In 1975, general freight operations were transferred completely to Marburg.

During 1978, 104,566 tickets were sold, but sales fell to 58,004 in 1983. In 1984, the main station office was closed. There were extensive changes in the 1988 timetable: twelve D-Zug express train connections were cancelled, but the number of semi-fast trains increased from 19 to 26. The newly introduced InterRegio services ran non-stop through the station. In 1994, the express and local trains were replaced by Regionalbahn and Regional-Express trains, so the station lost all long-distance services. After the Rhein-Main-Verkehrsverbund (Rhine-Main Transport Association, RMV) was established in 1995, and launched in 1997, the railway postal traffic was abandoned completely. The station building has not been used since the closure of the ticket office and the waiting room on 30 June 2001. Tickets can now be purchased only from travel agents and ticket machines. In December 2006, the Mittelhessen-Express was introduced, running hourly between Frankfurt and Treysa. The complete rebuilding of the station area and the city centre began in 2009.

== Conversion for the Hessentag ==
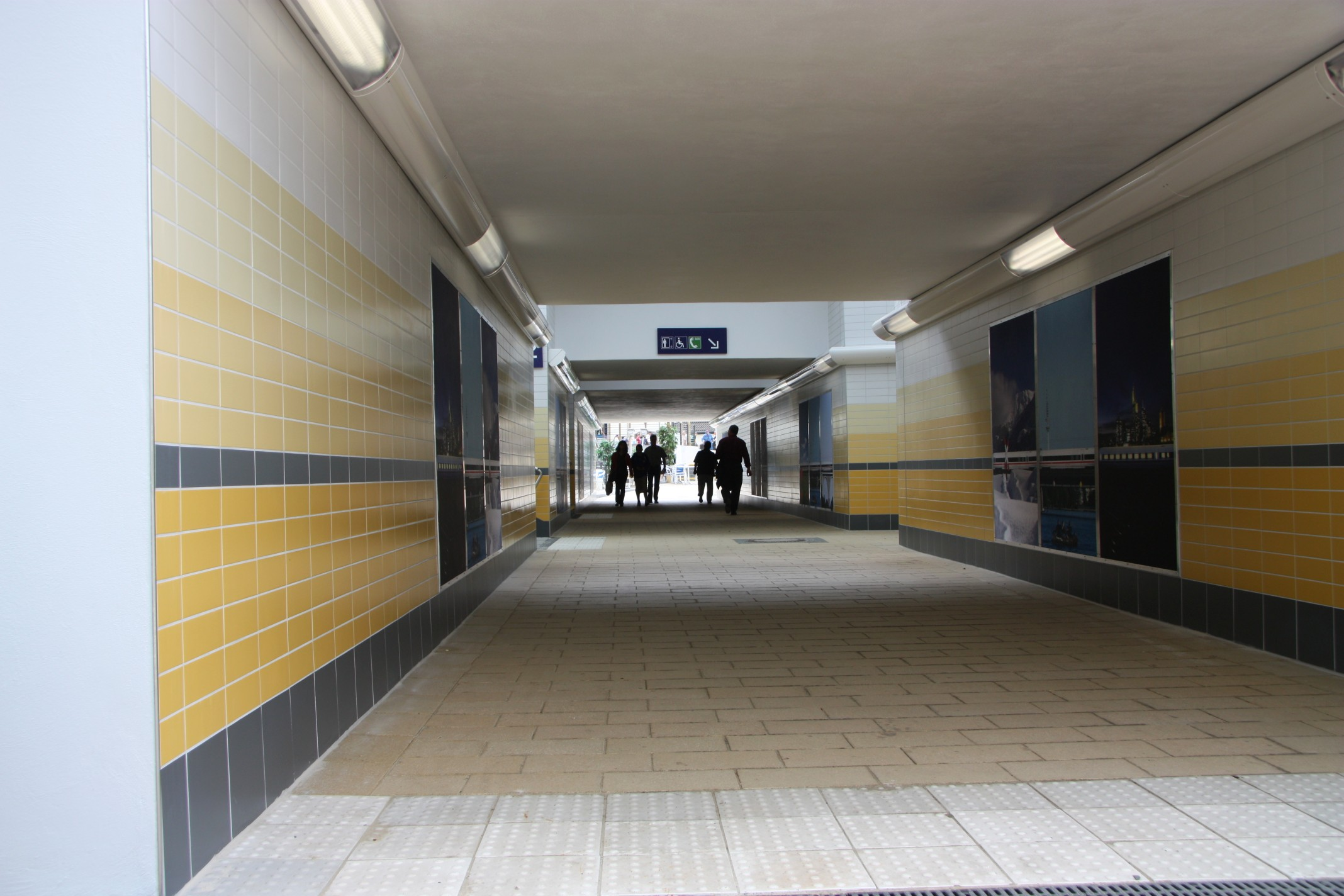
Rebuilt pedestrian underpass

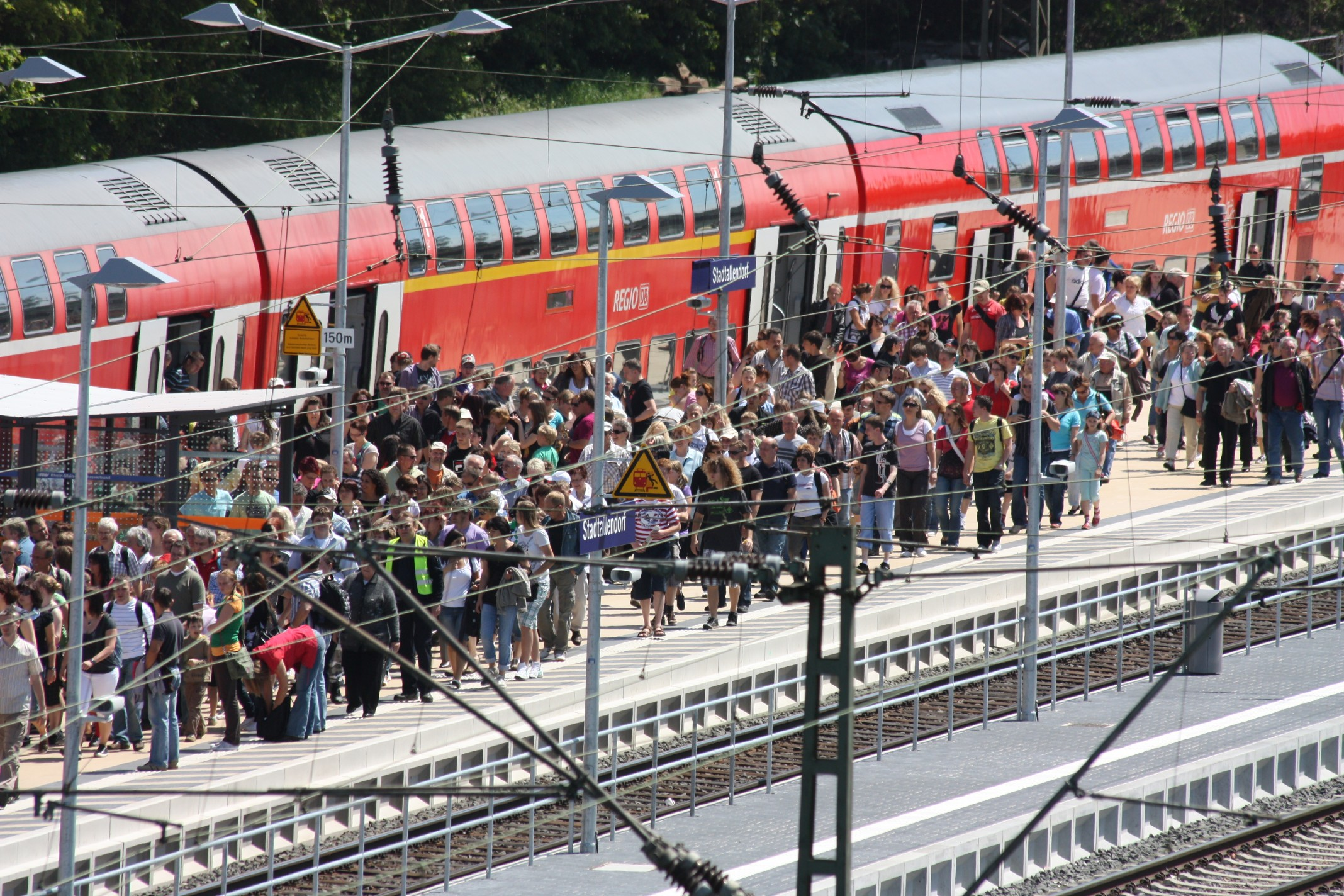
Crowds on the platform for Hessentag 2010

The town of Stadtallendorf was the site of the Hessentag (Hesse day) celebrations of 2010 and the station was rehabilitated and made accessible for the disabled with federal and state grants totalling €7.3 million. The groundbreaking ceremony took place on 17 July 2009 and work began the following day. A park and ride facility was built after Hessentag partly because its location was required for a Hessentag function. The restoration of the station was completed on 25 May 2010.

== Entrance building ==
The station building was opened in 1908. A modern bus shelter with a ticket office was built in 1964 on the western side and the main station building was completely renovated in 1968.

Since June 2001 the station building has not been used as the waiting room and the ticket office has been closed. In 2009, a complete renovation of the station building began. The freight hall was demolished and the annex built in 1964 was converted into a bike parking station with 41 parking spaces and toilets. The main building now houses an apartment, a travel agency and a staff room for shunting staff.

== Operations ==
=== Passengers ===
The station is located in the area of the Rhein-Main-Verkehrsverbund (Rhine-Main Transport Association, RMV) and is served at hourly intervals by the Mittelhessen-Express (RB 41) and every two hours by the RE 98 (Main-Sieg-Express). The RE 30 run between Treysa and Frankfurt (Main) Hauptbahnhof and the RE 98 runs between Kassel and Frankfurt. Both services are coupled with a train running from Dillenburg in Gießen. The RE 30 also operates every two hours between Kassel and Frankfurt.

RMV line	Route	Frequency
RE 30	Frankfurt – Friedberg (Hess) – Gießen – Marburg (Lahn) – Stadtallendorf – Treysa – Kassel-Wilhelmshöhe – Kassel Hbf	120 mins
RE 98 (Main-Sieg-Express)	Frankfurt (Main) Hbf – Friedberg – Gießen – Marburg – Stadtallendorf – Treysa – Kassel-Wilhelmshöhe – Kassel Hbf	120 mins
RB 41 (Mittelhessen-Express)	Frankfurt (Main) Hbf – Friedberg (Hess) – Butzbach – Gießen – Marburg – Kirchhain – Stadtallendorf – Neustadt – Treysa	60 min (weekdays); 120 min (weekends); 120 min (Stadtallendorf – Treysa)

=== Freight ===
Freight transport in Stadtallendorf is dominated by the bulk traffic of the Fritz Winter foundry which is supplied over the rail with quartz sand among other things. The extensive system of tracks is still mostly used for the shunting and parking of wagons. Since about 1980, the sidings have been closed.

=== Interlockings ===
Stadtallendorf has had two signal boxes since the Second World War, which are still in use today. The mechanical interlocking Af is at the level of the platforms and is controlled by a dispatcher. Another mechanical interlocking, Ao, is located in the southeast of the station at the junction of the railway sidings.

=== Buses ===
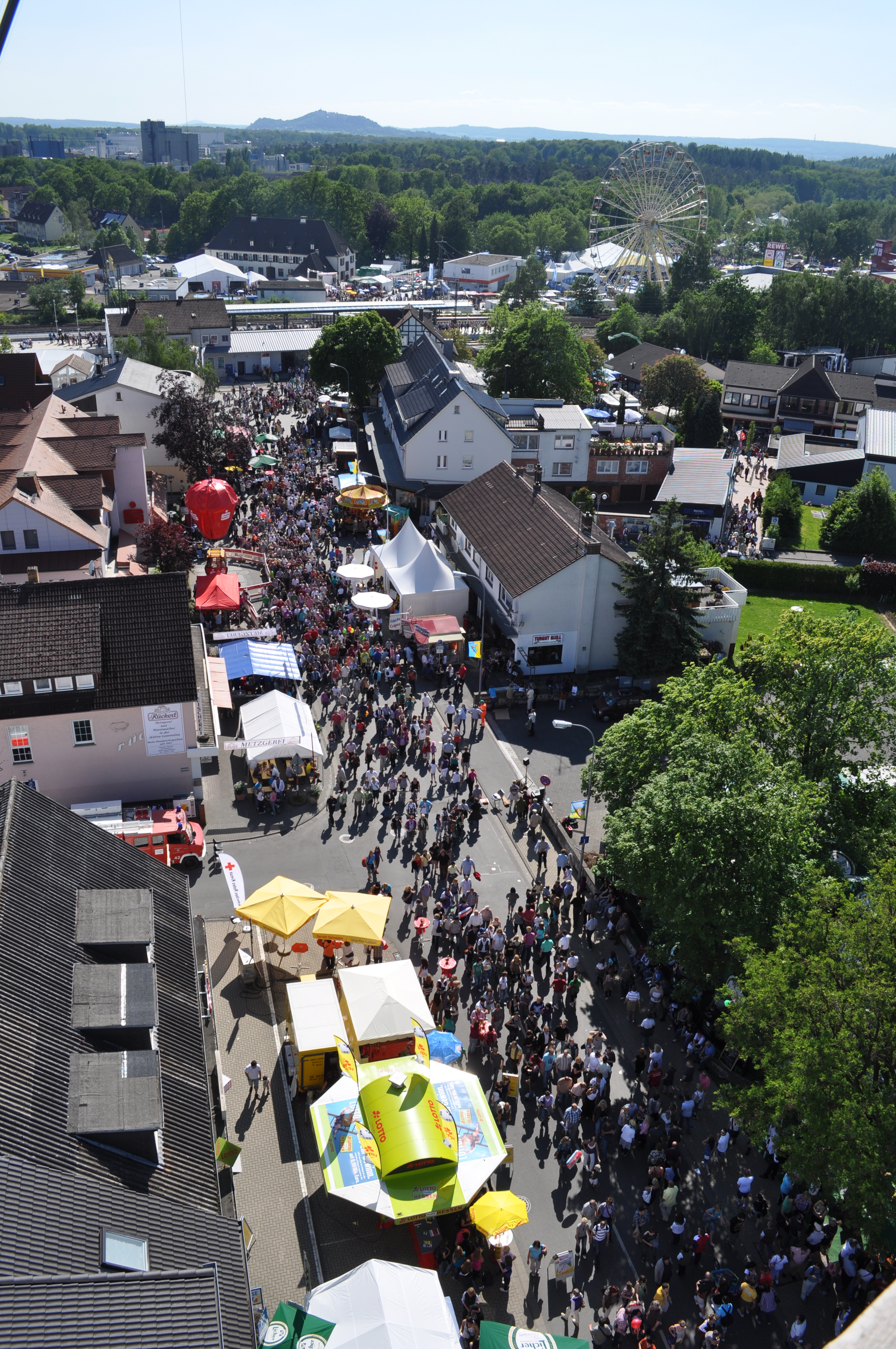
View from the town church on the festival site and the station during Hessentag 2010

The Stadtallendorf bus station is about 100 metres south of the DB station. It is served by the following bus lines:

- MR-85 (Schweinsberg–Niederklein–Marburg–Niederklein–Schweinsberg)
- MR-90 (Wolferode–Hatzbach–Erksdorf–Hatzbach–Stadtallendorf)
- 91 (Stadtallendorf municipal buses)
- 92 (Stadtallendorf municipal buses)

The current bus station was opened in 2009, as the old one, built in the early 1980s, was replaced by a new shopping centre.
