= Wabern (Bz Kassel) station =

Train station in Germany

Wabern (Bz Kassel)
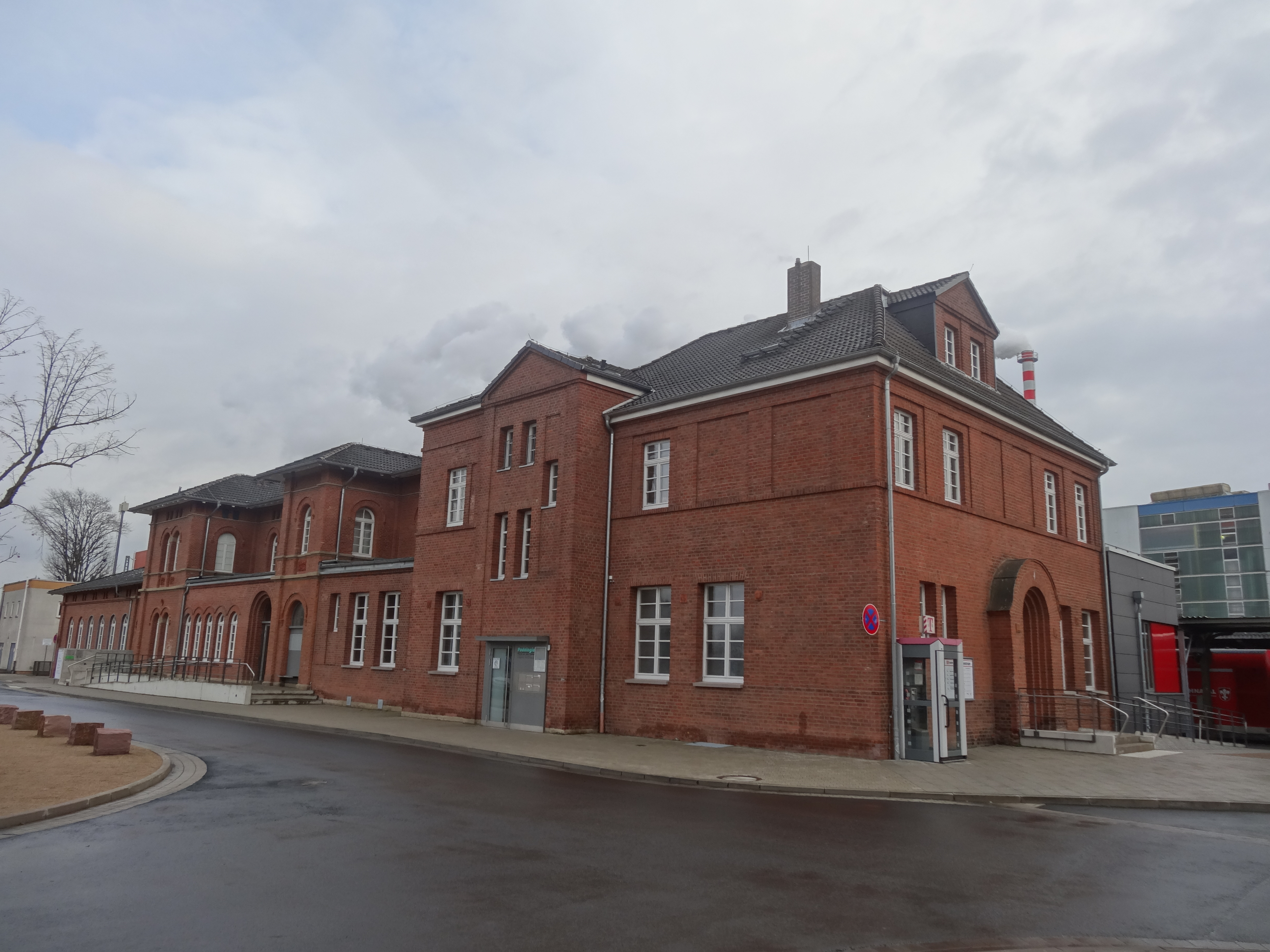

General information
- Location: Bahnhofstr. 1, Wabern, Hesse; Germany
- Coordinates: 51°06′11″N 9°21′30″E
- Lines: Main–Weser Railway; Wabern–Bad Wildungen railway
- Platforms: 5

Construction
- Accessible: Yes
- Architect: Julius Eugen Ruhl
- Architectural style: Rundbogenstil

Other information
- Station code: 6457
- DS100 code: FWAB
- IBNR: 8000368
- Category: 4
- Website: www.bahnhof.de

History
- Opened: 1849

Services
Preceding station	DB Fernverkehr	Following station
Kassel-Wilhelmshöhe towards Westerland (Sylt)	ICE 24	Treysa towards Frankfurt (Main) Hbf
Kassel-Wilhelmshöhe towards Bremen Hbf	ICE 26	Treysa towards Karlsruhe Hbf
Preceding station	DB Regio Mitte	Following station
Felsberg-Gensungen towards Kassel Hbf	RE 30	Singlis towards Frankfurt (Main) Hbf
Preceding station	Hessische Landesbahn	Following station
Felsberg-Gensungen towards Kassel Hbf	RE 98	Singlis towards Frankfurt (Main) Hbf
Preceding station	Kurhessenbahn	Following station
Felsberg-Gensungen towards Kassel Hbf	RE 39	Zennern towards Bad Wildungen
Felsberg-Gensungen towards Kassel Hbf	RB 39	Zennern towards Bad Wildungen
Location

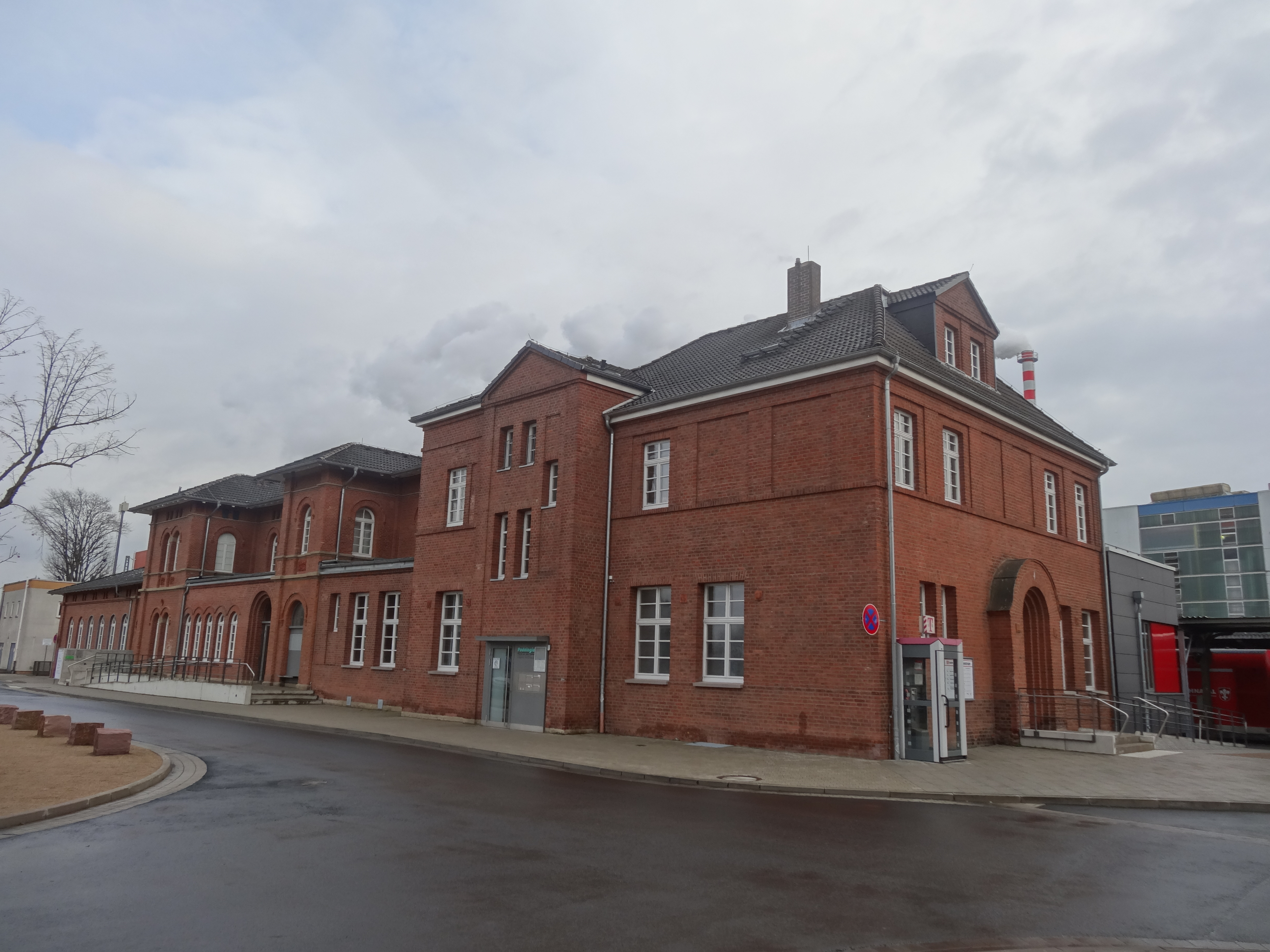
Wabern station building

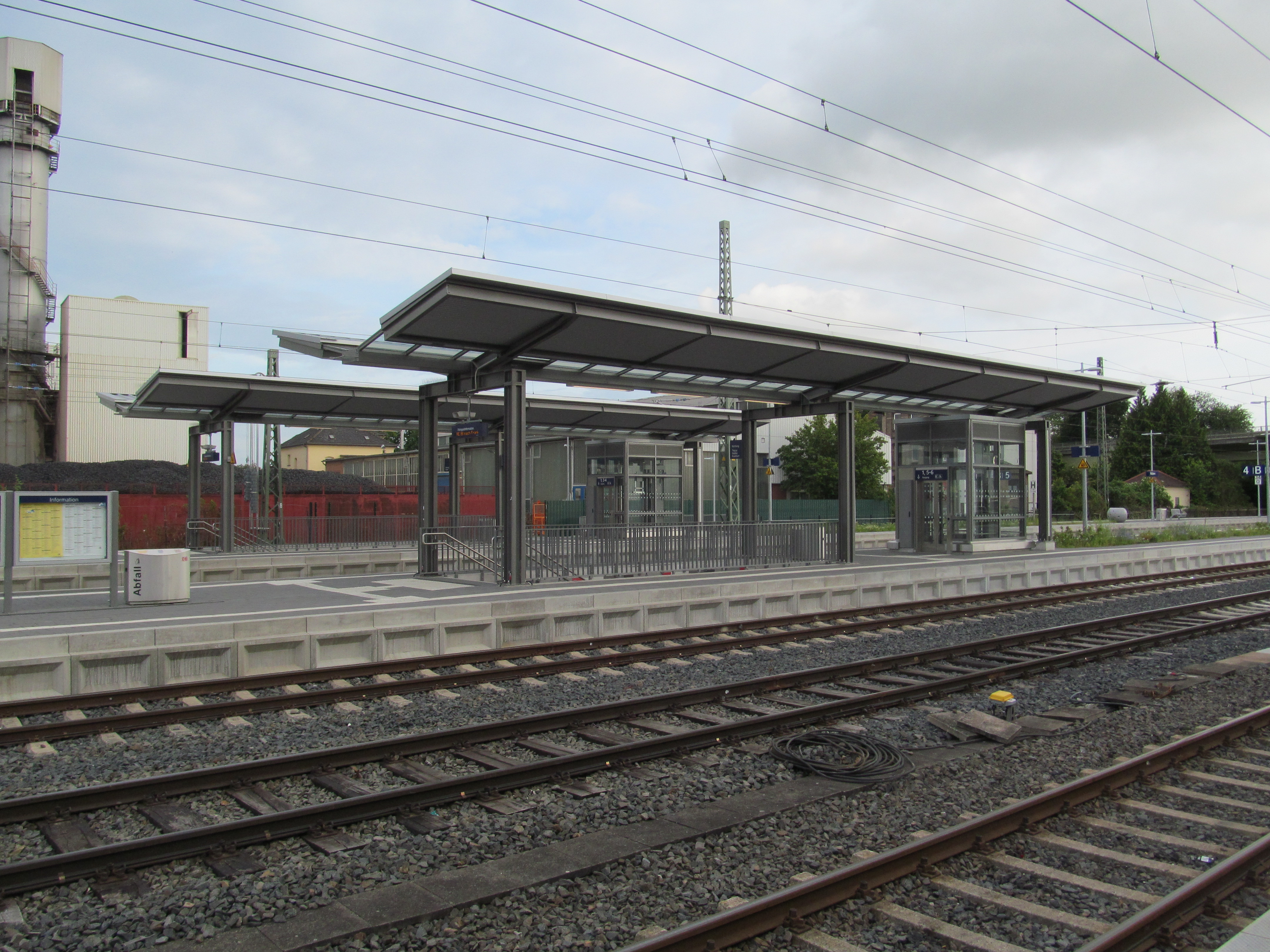
Wabern station platforms

Wabern (Bz Kassel) is a railway station in the municipality of Wabern, in the German state of Hesse. It is on the Main to Weser railway from Frankfurt to Kassel. The station is a stop for ICE trains with connections towards Bremen and Karlsruhe. It was once an important railway junction, as the line to Brilon Wald (Wabern–Bad Wildungen and Wega–Brilon Wald lines) branched off here with a connection to the Ruhr area. Today this branch line ends in Bad Wildungen.

The station opened in December 1849, at the same time as the railway line from Kassel. The extension to Treysa opened a few days later. The station has a main building designed by Julius Eugen Ruhl.

In 2018 the station was modernized to be barrier-free, involving the construction of a new underpass, three elevators and raised platforms. The work cost €15 million.

In the 2026 timetable, the following services stop at the station:

Line	Route	Interval
ICE 24	Westerland – Hamburg – Hanover – Kassel – Wabern – Frankfurt	1 train pair
ICE 26	Bremen – Hanover – Göttingen – Kassel – Wabern – Gießen – Frankfurt – Heidelberg – Karlsruhe	Every four hours
RE 30	Kassel Hbf – Kassel-Wilhelmshöhe – Wabern – Treysa – Marburg – Gießen – Frankfurt	120 min
RE 39; RB 39	Kassel Hbf – Kassel-Wilhelmshöhe – Wabern – Bad Wildungen	60 min (weekdays); 120 min (weekend)
RE 98 (Main-Sieg-Express)	Kassel Hbf – Kassel-Wilhelmshöhe – Wabern – Treysa – Marburg – Gießen – Frankfurt	120 mins
