= Treysa station =

Train station in Germany

Treysa
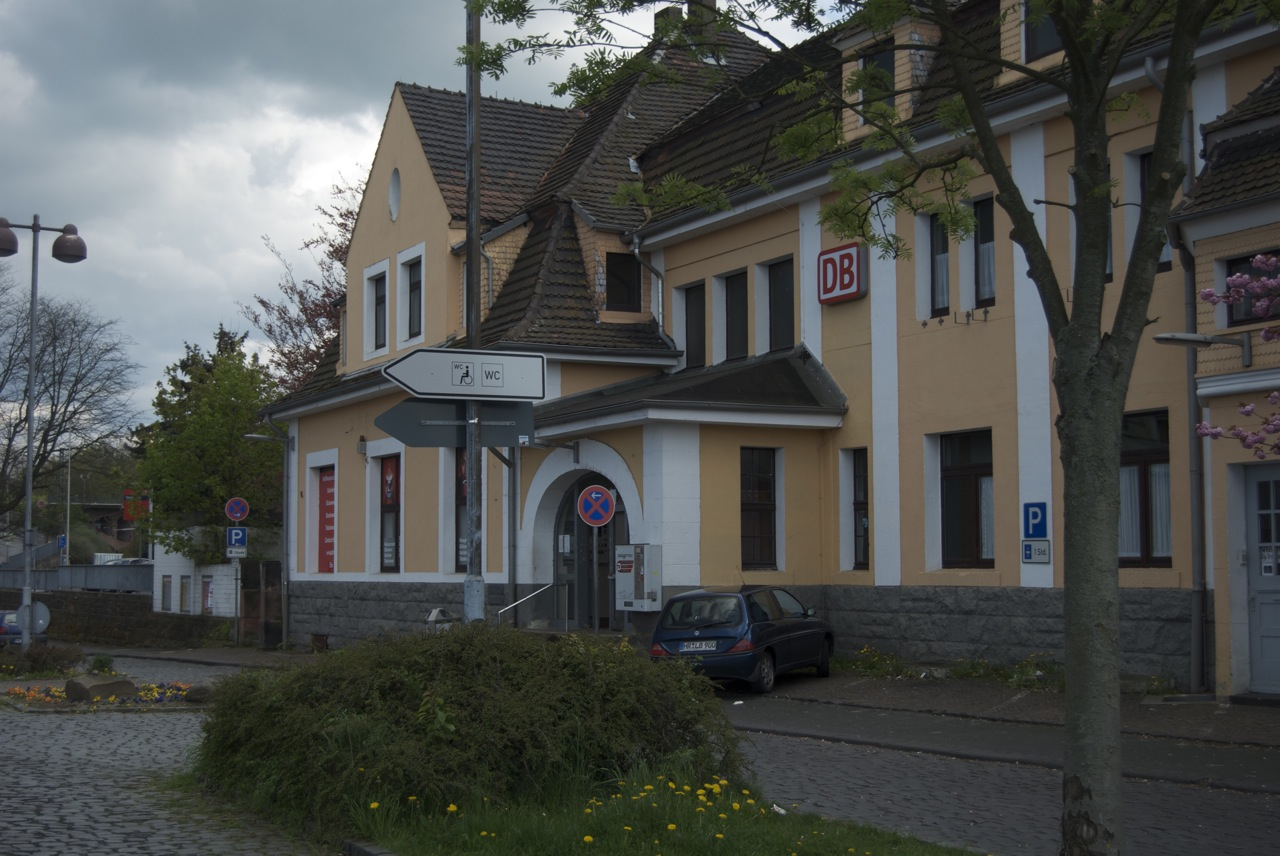

General information
- Location: Bahnhofstr. 1, Schwalmstadt, Hesse; Germany
- Coordinates: 50°54′37″N 9°11′9″E
- Lines: Main–Weser Railway (62.3 km); Leinefelde–Treysa railway (130.0 km) (closed); Bad Hersfeld–Treysa railway (62.2 km) (closed)
- Platforms: 5

Construction
- Accessible: Yes
- Architect: Alois Holtmeyer

Other information
- Station code: 6256
- DS100 code: FTS
- IBNR: 8000129
- Category: 4
- Fare zone: NVV: 4220; : 8310 (NVV transitional tariff)
- Website: www.bahnhof.de

History
- Opened: 1908

Services
Preceding station	DB Fernverkehr	Following station
Wabern towards Westerland (Sylt)	ICE 24	Marburg towards Frankfurt (Main) Hbf
Wabern towards Bremen Hbf	ICE 26	Marburg towards Karlsruhe Hbf
Preceding station	DB Regio Mitte	Following station
Borken (Hess) towards Kassel Hbf	RE 30	Neustadt (Hessen) towards Frankfurt (Main) Hbf
Preceding station	Hessische Landesbahn	Following station
Schlierbach (Kr Schwalm-Eder) towards Kassel Hbf	RE 98	Schwalmstadt-Wiera towards Frankfurt (Main) Hbf
Terminus	RB 41	Schwalmstadt-Wiera towards Frankfurt (Main) Hbf
Preceding station	Kurhessenbahn	Following station
Schlierbach (Kr Schwalm-Eder towards Kassel Hbf	RB 38	Terminus
Location

Treysa station (German: Bahnhof Treysa) is a train station in Schwalmstadt, Hesse, on the Main–Weser Railway. It was formerly a railway junction, connecting to the Leinefelde–Treysa section of the Cannons Railway (German: Kanonenbahn).

The station is frequented by 2,500 passengers daily. The station is classified by Deutsche Bahn (DB) as a category 4 station.

== History ==
A small railway station was built in Treysa during the construction of the Main–Weser Railway (Kassel–Frankfurt am Main) in 1850. It was located about one kilometre northeast of the present station. It was built as a neoclassical brick building in 1847/48 according to the plans of the Kassel architect Julius Eugen Ruhl. This station was expanded during the construction of the Leinefelde–Treysa railway (via Eschwege), which was opened in 1876 as a section of the strategic railway between Berlin and Metz, called the Cannons Railway (Kanonenbahn).

This station (now also called the Alter Bahnhof, "Old Station") was too small to allow the connection of the Bad Hersfeld–Treysa railway (known as the Knüllwaldbahn), which was completed in 1907. So a new station was built south of the former station. It was opened on 1 October 1908. The new station was served by express trains and there were connections to Bad Hersfeld and to Eschwege. Platform tracks 1 and 2 were used by the Main–Weser Railway, track 3 was used by overtaking trains, track 4 was used for services to and from Eschwege and track 5 for services to and from Bad Hersfeld. A freight yard with a roundhouse and a turntable was built south of the passenger station.

Since the early 1980s, both of the lines branching in Treysa, the former Cannons Railway and the Bad Hersfeld–Treysa railway, were gradually closed. In the case of the Cannons Railway, passenger services between Treysa and Malsfeld were closed on 30 May 1981, the last daily freight service that still operated between Treysa and Homberg (Efze) was terminated on 25 June 2002. Passenger services on the Bad Hersfeld–Treysa railway from Treysa to Oberaula were abandoned on 1 June 1984 and freight traffic ended in late 1995. Thus, there are now only rail connections towards Kassel and Marburg.

== Current operations ==
The station is within the tariff zone of the North Hesse Transport Association (Nordhessischer Verkehrsverbund, NVV). In the direction of Gießen the section from Neustadt is within the tariff zone of the Rhine-Main Transport Association (Rhein-Main-Verkehrsverbund, RMV).

Treysa station is served at 4-hour intervals by Intercity trains on line 26 (Bremen–Hanover–Frankfurt–Karlsruhe). There are also Regional-Express services every two hours between Frankfurt and Kassel (RE 30) and the Mittelhessen-Express service runs at hourly intervals between Treysa and Frankfurt.

Even today, track 1 and 2 are served by the Main–Weser Railway. Trains that do not begin or end in Treysa use these tracks. Track 3 is used by the Mittelhessen-Express, which begins and ends here. Track 5 is now used mostly as a through track, when all the other tracks are in use. In the 2026 timetable, the following services stop at the station:

Line	Route	Frequency
ICE 24	Westerland – Hamburg – Hanover – Kassel-Wilhelmshöhe – Treysa – Frankfurt	1 train pair
ICE 26	Bremen – Hannover – Kassel – Treysa – Frankfurt – Heidelberg – Karlsruhe	240 mins
RE 30	Frankfurt – Friedberg – Gießen – Marburg – Kirchhain – Treysa – Wabern – Kassel-Wilhelmshöhe – Kassel Hbf	120 mins
RB 38	Treysa – Wabern – Baunatal-Guntershausen – Kassel-Wilhelmshöhe – Kassel Hbf	Some services in the peak
RE 98 (Main-Sieg-Express)	Frankfurt (Main) Hbf – Friedberg – Gießen – Marburg – Treysa – Kassel-Wilhelmshöhe – Kassel Hbf	120 mins
RB 41 (Mittelhessen-Express)	Frankfurt – Friedberg – Butzbach – Gießen – Marburg – Kirchhain – Stadtallendorf – Neustadt – Treysa	120 min (weekdays)

There is a bus station in front of the station building, which is served by buses to Frielendorf, Homberg and to the surrounding villages.
