= Butzbach station =

Railway station in Butzbach, Germany

Butzbach
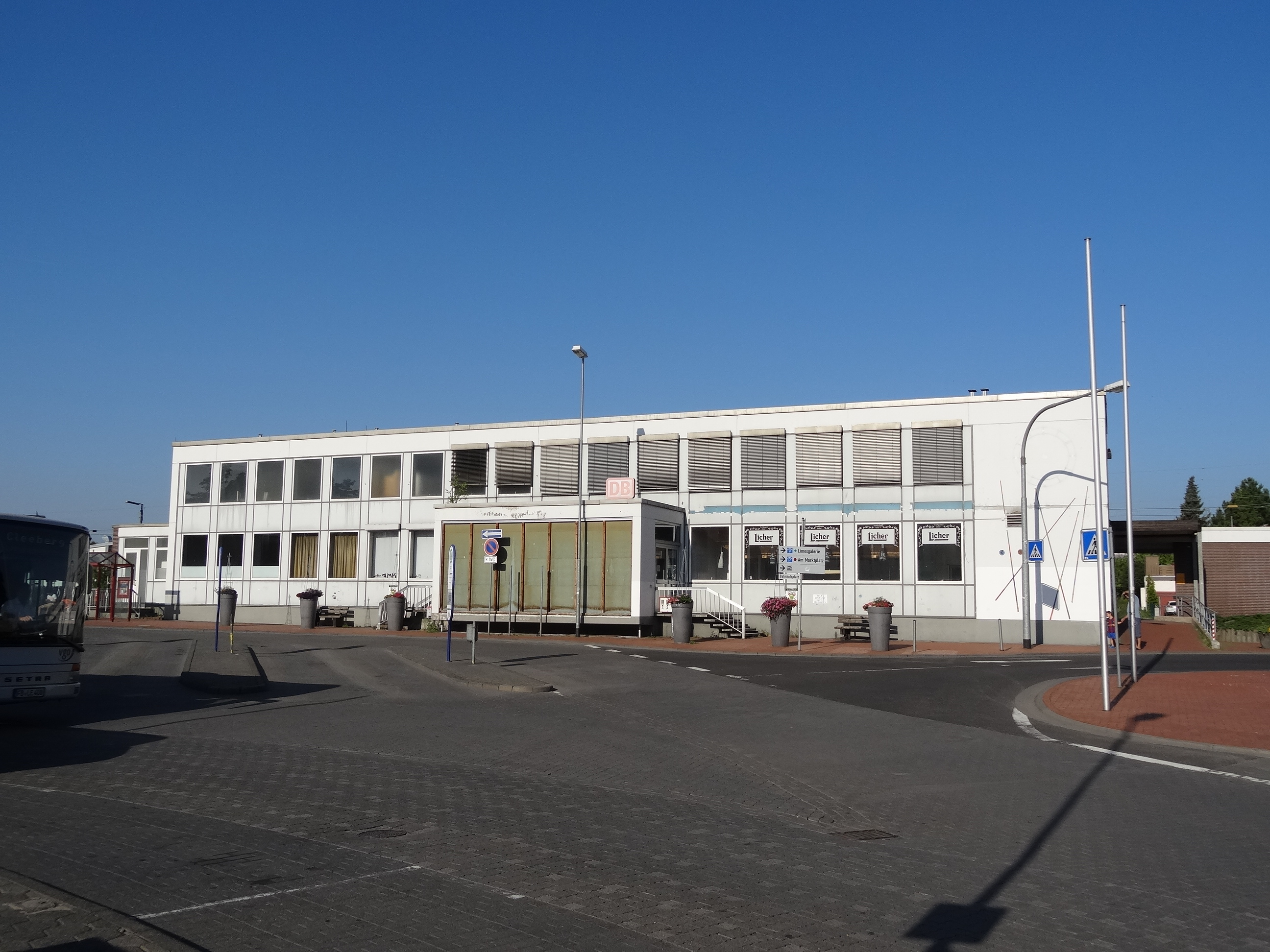

General information
- Location: Bahnhofstr. 8 Butzbach, Hesse; Germany
- Coordinates: 50°25′52″N 8°40′10″E
- Owner: DB InfraGO
- Operator: DB InfraGO
- Lines: Main–Weser Railway (151.9 km); Butzbach–Lich Railway (0.0 km)
- Platforms: 3

Construction
- Accessible: Platform 1 only

Other information
- Station code: 1013
- DS100 code: FBZ
- Category: 4
- Fare zone: : 2201
- Website: www.bahnhof.de

History
- Opened: 9 November 1850

Services
Preceding station	Hessische Landesbahn	Following station
Butzbach-Kirch-Göns towards Frankfurt (Main) Hbf	RB 37	Butzbach-Ostheim towards Gießen or Marburg
Preceding station	DB Regio Mitte	Following station
Gießen towards Dillenburg	RB 40	Bad Nauheim towards Frankfurt (Main) Hbf
Gießen towards Treysa	RB 41	Bad Nauheim towards Frankfurt (Main) Hbf
Gießen towards Kassel Hbf	RE 30	Bad Nauheim towards Frankfurt (Main) Hbf
Location
- Location within Hesse

Butzbach station is a station in the town of Butzbach in the German state of Hesse on the Main–Weser Railway. The station was formerly the starting point of the Butzbach–Lich Railway leading to Lich and Grünberg. The station is classified by Deutsche Bahn as a category 4 station.

== History ==
The station was opened along with the Butzbach–Friedberg section of the Main–Weser Railway on 9 November 1850.

On 28 March 1904, the Butzbach–Lich Railway was opened. This had its own station, Butzbach West station, next to the mainline station. From here, trains ran via Butzbach Ost, where the railway's operating base is still located, and Griedel to Lich Süd near the Gießen–Gelnhausen railway (also known as the Lahn-Kinzig Railway). The line was extended to Queckborn on 15 July 1909 and to Grünberg Süd on 1 August 1909, connecting with the Gießen–Fulda railway. Another line of the railway branched off at Griedel and ran through the Wetter valley to Bad Nauheim Nord, which could be worked throughout from 2 April 1910. The line from Butzbach Ost was extended to Ebersgöns on 13 May 1910, after a postponement from 1 May, and the final section from Ebersgöns to Oberkleen, then in the Prussian district of Wetzlar, was completed on 1 June 1910. Passenger services between Butzbach West and Butzbach Ost and between Griedel and Lich Süd ended on 27 May 1961, when the section from Hof- und Dorf-Güll to Lich Süd closed completely. The last passenger service between Butzbach Ost and Bad Nauheim Nord, and the last on the railway as a whole, ran on 31 May 1975.

== Services ==
Butzbach station is no longer a railway junction. It is served by the Mittelhessen-Express services RB 40 and RB 41, which run coupled between Frankfurt Hauptbahnhof and Gießen. The two portions divide there: RB 41 continues via Marburg to Treysa, while RB 40 continues via Wetzlar and Herborn to Dillenburg. These services have been operated by Hessische Landesbahn since December 2023, when the line RB 37 between Frankfurt and Gießen was also introduced, serving all intermediate stations. Since the timetable change in December 2025, RB 40 and RB 41 have run hourly between Gießen and Frankfurt, calling only at Butzbach, Bad Nauheim and Friedberg. Some Regional-Express services on line RE 30 between Frankfurt and Kassel also call at Butzbach, mainly at peak times; most RE 30 trains run through without stopping.

== Accessibility ==
Only platform 1 has step-free access; platforms 2 and 3 do not. All three platforms have passenger information displays and public address systems, but none has tactile guidance for blind and partially sighted passengers. Platform 1 is 76 cm (30 in) high, while platforms 2 and 3 are 38 cm (15 in).

== Bus services and parking ==
There is a large bus station at Butzbach station, which is served by regional and city buses to the city of Butzbach, the Butzbach suburbs and the surrounding villages and towns.

There is also a park and ride facility at the station, which is operated by the city of Butzbach.
