= Mittelhessen-Express =

Train service in Germany

RB 40/41: Mittelhessen-Express
- Line map

Technical
- Operating speed: 160 km/h (99 mph) (maximum)

The Mittelhessen-Express is a train service operated by Hessische Landesbahn in the German state of Hesse on the Main-Weser Railway and the Dill Railway, using Alstom Coradia Continental sets.

Services were operated by DB Regio Hessen, a wholly owned subsidiary of DB Regio, from the commencement of the 2007 timetable in December 2006 until December 2023 with Bombardier Talent 2 electric multiple units.

== Operations and services ==
The Mittelhessen-Express runs on the Treysa – Gießen – Frankfurt (RB 41) and Dillenburg – Giessen – Frankfurt (RB 40) routes, although many services on the RB 41 have not run over the entire route since 13 December 2015. The RegionalBahn services on the Gießen – Fredberg – Hanau route (RB 49) are also branded as Mittelhessen-Express. When Hessische Landesbahn took over operations in December 2023, the existing lines were supplemented with a new Frankfurt – Friedberg – Gießen (– Kirchhain) line (RB 37) as an hourly addition to the RB40/RB41 that stops at all stations between Friedberg and Gießen. In a second operating stage from December 2026, the RB37 is planned to run hourly between Frankfurt and Gießen, while all trains running as coupled portions (RB 40 and RB 41) will run with limited stops between Frankfurt and Gießen.

On the Gießen–Dillenburg and Gießen–Treysa sections, the Mittelhessen-Express serves all stations, with many trains ending in Marburg, Kirchhain or Stadtallendorf instead of Treysa, and some trains towards Dillenburg ending in Wetzlar or Herborn. Between Giessen and Frankfurt, trains that stop at a few stations alternate with those that have many intermediate stops. The trains running according to the original Mittelhessen concept only have intermediate stops at Butzbach, Bad Nauheim, Friedberg and Frankfurt West. The other trains have an extended stop in Giessen (to be overtaken by an IC service) and stop at all stations until Friedberg. There is also a stop in Bad Vilbel, which results from the fact that the Mittelhessen-Express follows an S6 service of the Rhine-Main S-Bahn from there and therefore has to make an operational stop anyway.

The Mittelhessen-Express usually runs every hour. Between Gießen and Dillenburg as well as Gießen and Marburg there is an hourly service except during low traffic times. It runs every hour between Marburg and Stadtallendorf from Monday to Friday, otherwise every two hours. The Stadtallendorf–Treysa section is hardly served at all on weekends, otherwise every hour in the morning and afternoon. The Mittelhessen-Express lines RB 40 and RB 41 run every hour between Gießen and Frankfurt. However, there is no hourly frequency because the travel times of successive trains vary greatly.

The train usually consists of two portions, which are separated in Gießen. The front part of the train continues to Treysa via Marburg, the rear part of the train continues to Dillenburg via Wetzlar. The splitting and joining of trains are discontinued during off-peak times. A three-section train also runs in the afternoon, with the middle part of the train separated in Stadtallendorf.

The best-case travel time from Frankfurt to Treysa is 1 hour and 47 minutes, and to Dillenburg 1 hour and 30 minutes. In Giessen, trains have a scheduled stop of 4 or 11 minutes. The rear part of the train then reverses and continues to Dillenburg. The front part of the train runs from Gießen to Marburg, Kirchhain or Treysa.

== Rolling stock ==
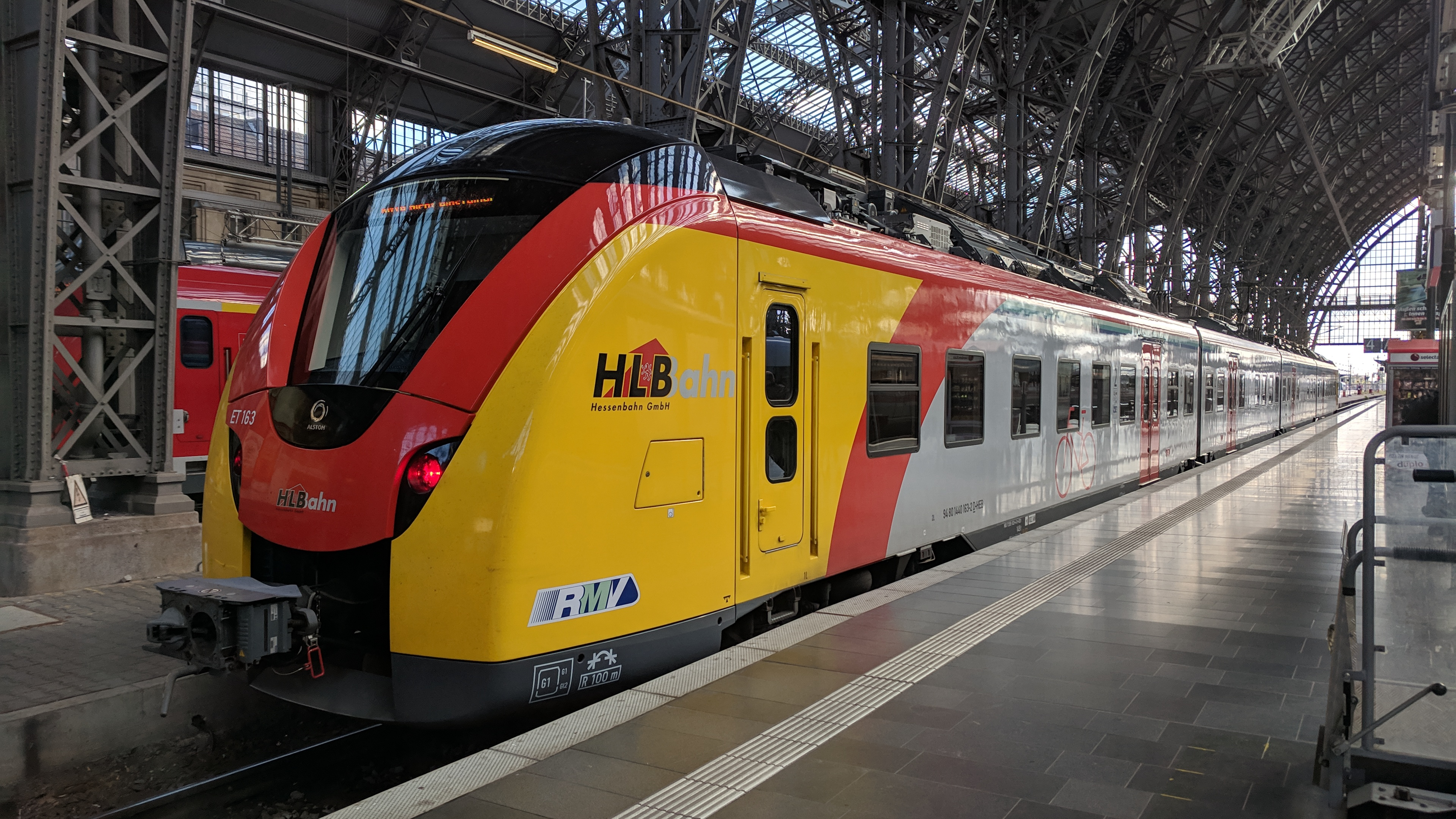
An Alstom Coradia Continental set from HLB, as it will be used on the Mittelhessen-Express from mid-2024

Since the takeover by Hessische Landesbahn in December 2023, 32 four and five-car Alstom Coradia Continental electric multiple units (class 1440) have been intended to operate on the route, although this has been delayed by problems with software. In the meantime, Bombardier Talent 2 sets and other borrowed rolling stock have been operated.

== See also ==
- List of rail services of the Rhein-Main-Verkehrsverbund
