= Main–Weser Railway =

German rail line

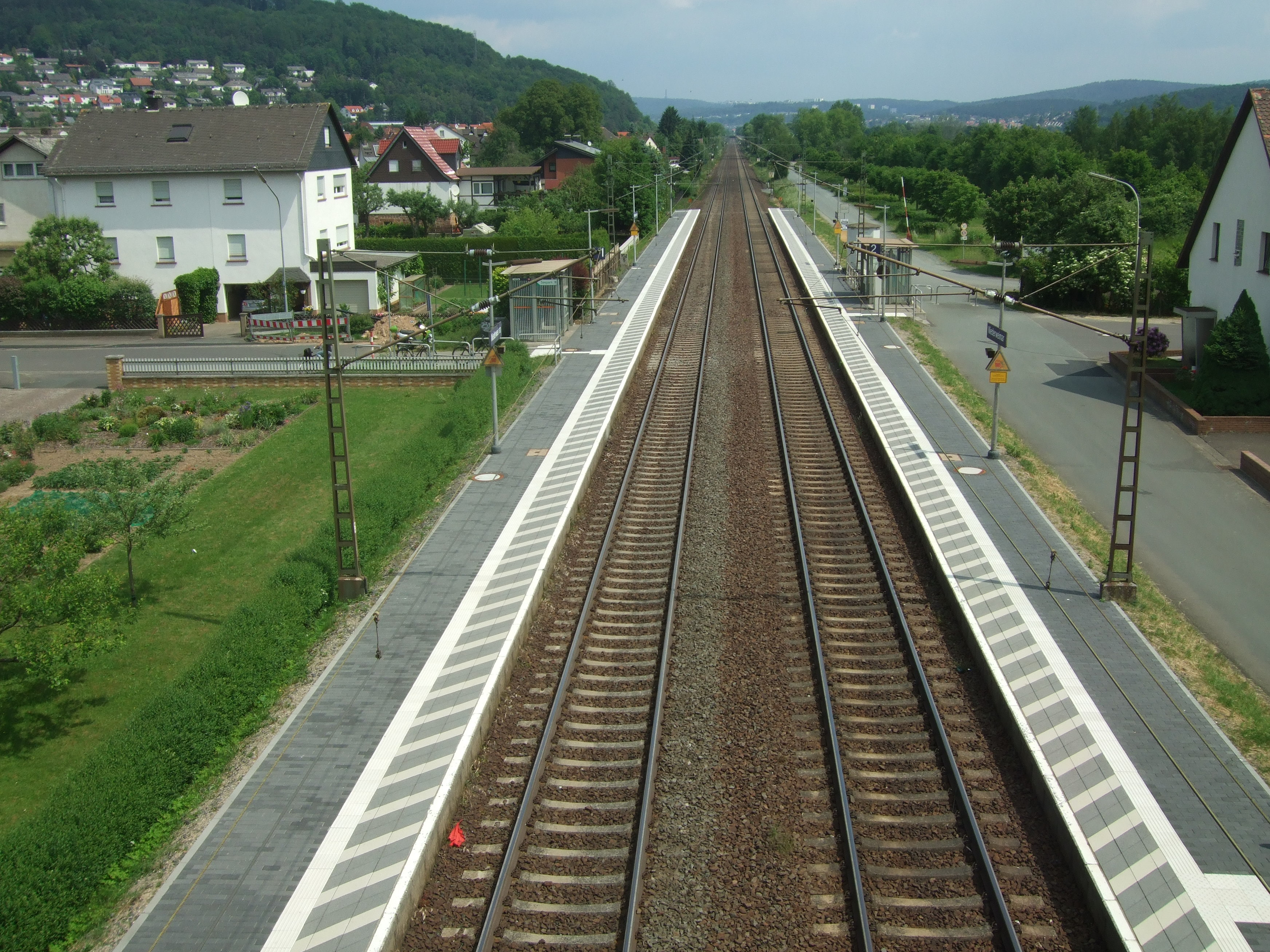
- Main-Weser-Bahn at Niederweimar

Overview
- Native name: Main-Weser-Bahn
- Status: Operational
- Owner: DB Netz
- Line number: 3900
- Locale: Hesse, Germany
- Termini: Kassel Hbf; Frankfurt Hbf
- Stations: 52

Service
- Type: Heavy rail, Passenger/freight rail Intercity rail, Regional rail, Commuter rail
- Route number: 614.9 (RegioTram to Treysa); 620 (Kassel–Gießen); 630 (Gießen–Frankfurt); 645.6 (S-Bahn to Friedberg)
- Operator: DB Bahn

History
- Opened: Stages between 1848 and 1852

Technical
- Line length: 199.8 km (124.1 mi)
- Number of tracks: 2 (throughout)
- Track gauge: 1,435 mm (4 ft 8 1/2 in) standard gauge
- Electrification: 15 kV/16.7 Hz AC overhead catenary
- Operating speed: 160 km/h (99 mph)

The Main–Weser Railway (German: Main-Weser-Bahn) is a railway line in central Germany that runs from Frankfurt am Main via Gießen to Kassel. it is named after the railway company that built the line and also operated it until 1880. It was opened between 1849 and 1852 and was one of the first railways in Germany.

== Route ==
Based on today's kilometre markers the line is 199.8 km (124.1 mi) long between its termini. It is double-tracked and electrified. Its maximum speed limit is 160 km/h (99.4 mph), but this is only achievable in places on the southern part of the line. The Main–Weser Railway is one of the most important conventionally operated German railways.

== History ==
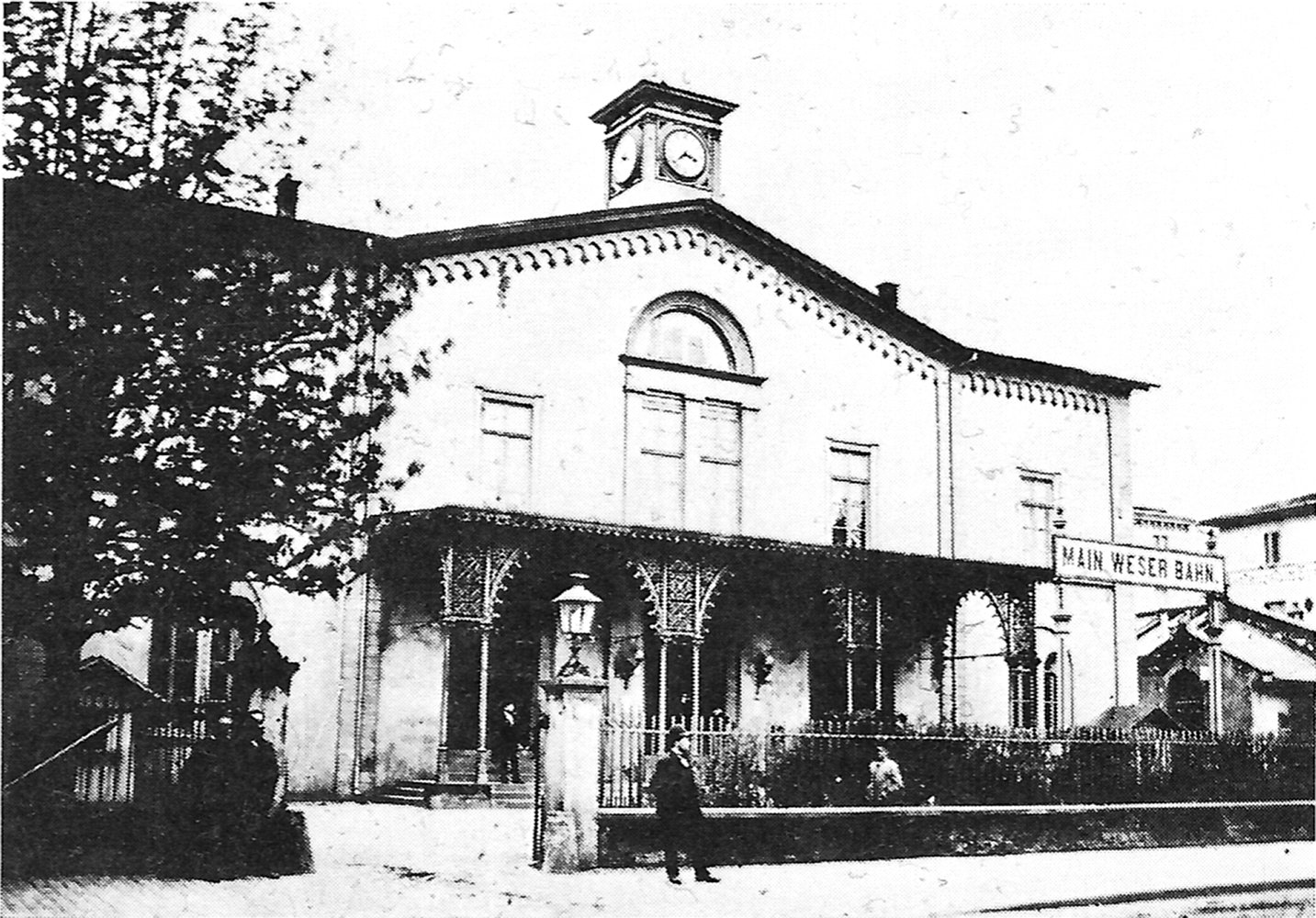
Main–Weser station in Frankfurt in 1889

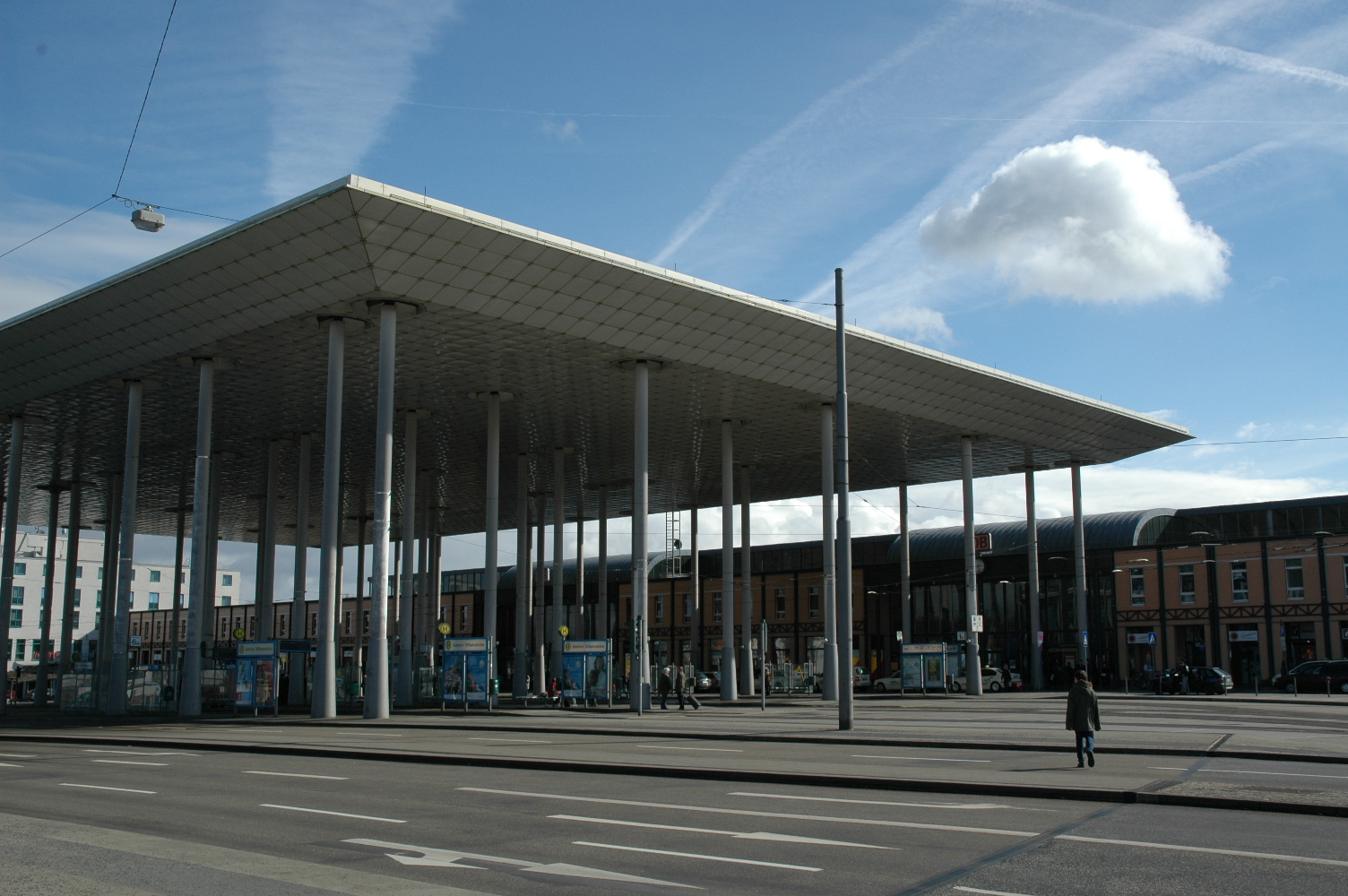
Covered forecourt at Kassel Wilhelmshöhe station

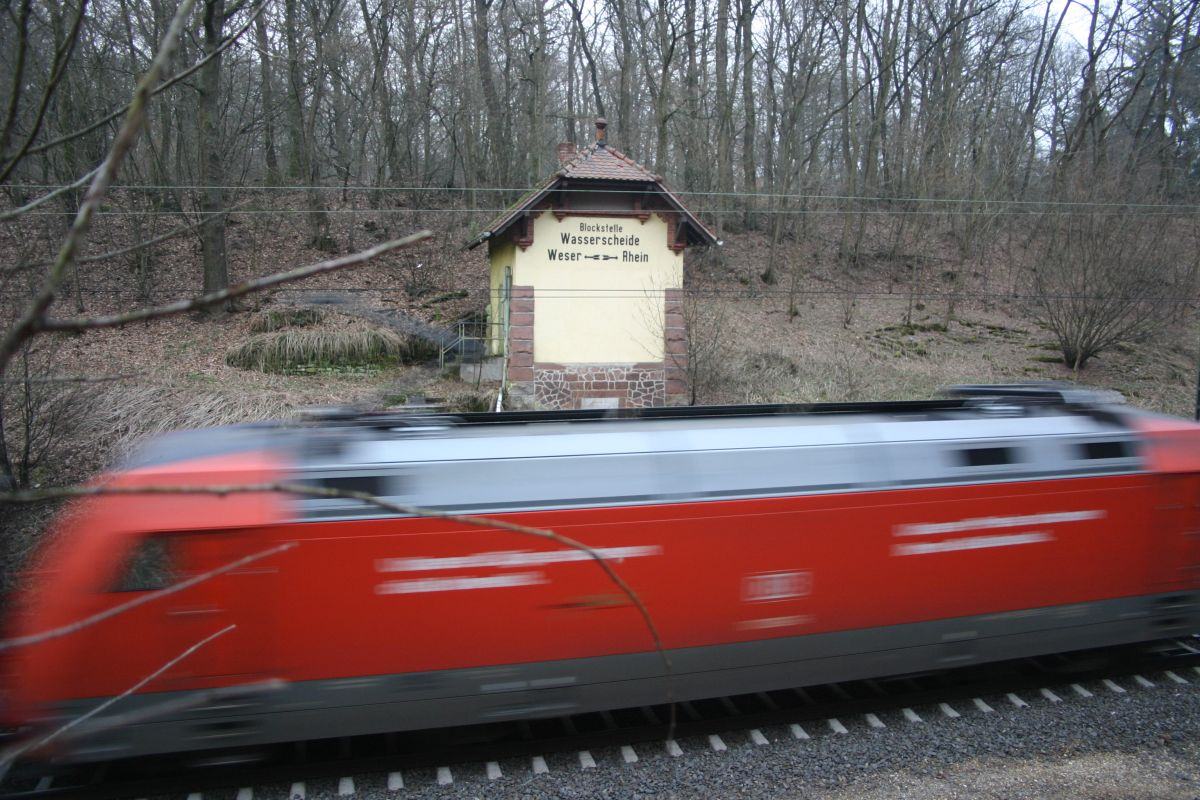
Signal box on watershed between Weser and Rhine rivers

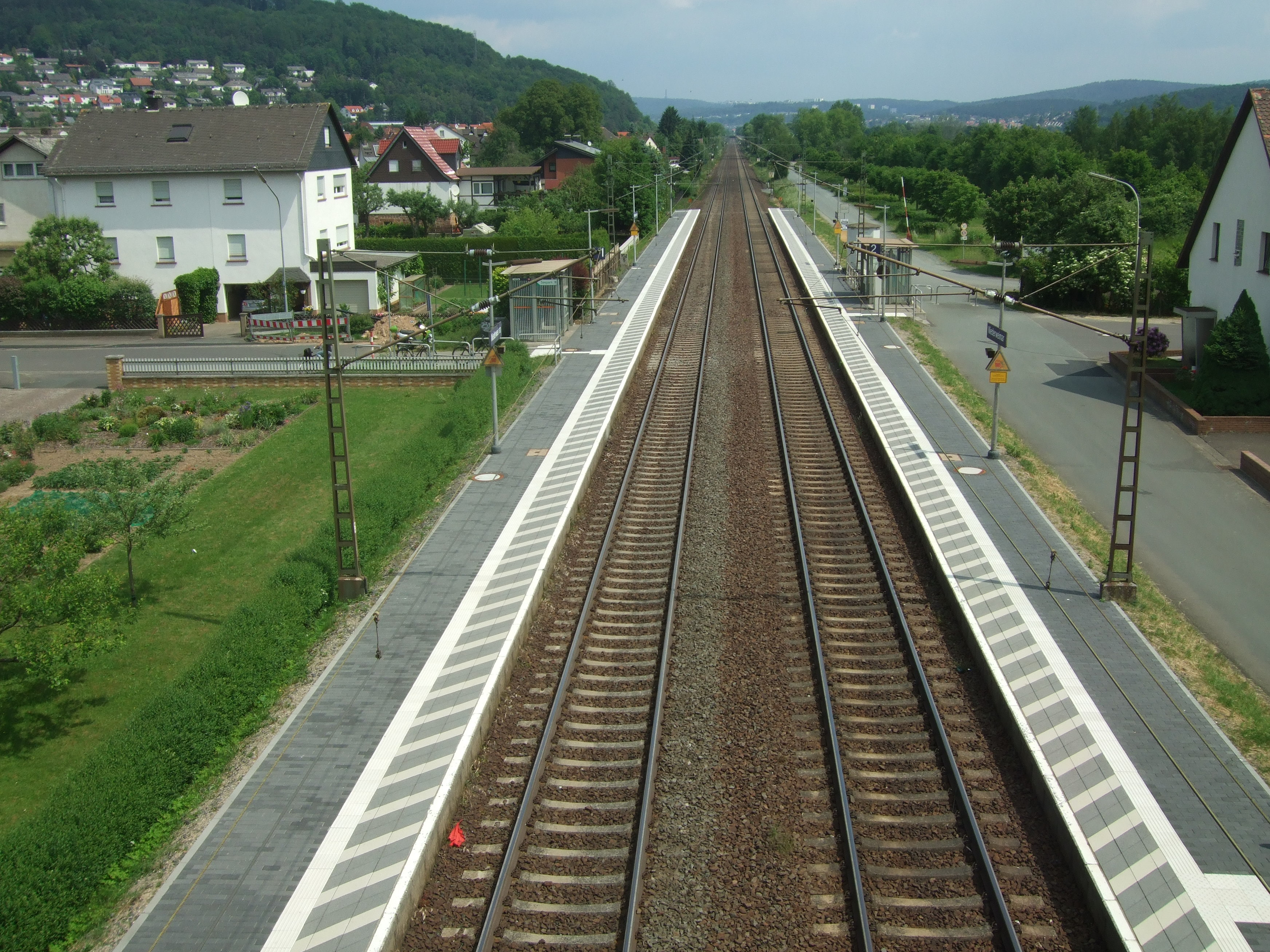
Main–Weser station in Marburg

The idea of building the Main–Weser Railway began in 1838 as a link between Kassel and the Rhine-Main area running exclusively through the territory of Hesse-Kassel (Kurhessen) and connecting the major cities of the electorate from Kassel to Hanau via Fulda. At that time it proved impracticable to build such a line (the route of the Frederick William Northern Railway and the Frankfurt–Bebra railway) because of its mountainous route, particularly at the watershed between the Fulda and Kinzig valleys at Distelrasen, where a tunnel was only completed in 1914.

Instead, beginning in 1841, negotiations commenced with some other states and was interrupted several times. On 5 April 1845, a treaty was signed between the Free City of Frankfurt, the Grand Duchy of Hesse-Darmstadt and the Electorate of Hesse-Kassel, establishing a joint state railway company, known as a condominium railway (Kondominalbahn). This established the legal basis for the line via Marburg, Gießen, and Friedberg through easier terrain to the originally preferred route, but which crossed national boundaries several times. In the southern sector, the route ran after its exit from the Main–Weser station in Frankfurt approximately parallel with the Taunusstrasse (English: Taunus Street) (at that time, only partly built), along the current streets of Friedrich-Ebert-Anlage and Hamburger Allee to the then Kurhessen town of Bockenheim, now the site of Frankfurt (Main) West station. It then ran again through the territory of Frankfurt in Hausen, through Kurhessen in Eschersheim, and through Frankfurt territory in Bonames. The line then went through the Grand Duchy of Hesse town of Boden bis Friedberg, then a piece of Frankfurt-owned territory in Dortelweil. Bad Nauheim was a Kurhessen enclave within the Grand Duchy of Hesse exclave of Oberhessen through which the line ran to Gießen. Under the treaty, each of the participating governments was responsible for the purchase of land on their territory. Financing the construction of the line proved to be more difficult. Construction occurred during the turmoil of the revolutions of 1848 and a financial crisis in the Grand Duchy of Hesse.

Work began on 6 August 1846 in Kurhessen territory. Here the Belgian engineer Frans Splingard and his colleague Edmund Hacault were in charge. In Frankfurt construction was directed by Remigius Eyssen. The building of station on almost all sections of the line in Kurhessen was directed by Julius Eugen Ruhl, the first Director-General of the Kurhessen railways.

The first section between Kassel and Wabern was opened on 29 December 1849. The first continuous rail service from Kassel to Frankfurt ran on 15 May 1852, after the opening of the line between Gießen and Langgöns, connecting the northern and the southern sections of the line.

The second track was added in 1865—following twelve years of negotiations. The cooperation of the participating countries had not improved despite rapidly developing rail services. The second track significantly eased the transport of Prussian troops in the War of 1866, a war which led to the annexation by Prussia of two of the states involved in Main–Weser Railway, Hesse-Kassel and the Free City of Frankfurt. Their shares were subsequently transferred to Prussia. In 1880, Prussia also acquired the Grand Duchy of Hesse's shares in the company.

Until the completion of the Frankfurt–Bebra line in 1866, all express trains between Frankfurt and Berlin ran on the Main–Weser Railway. These trains ran on to the Frederick William Northern Railway at Guntershausen to connect with the Thuringian Railway. Express trains continued to run from Frankfurt to Berlin via Kassel until the end of World War II. In the following years of the American occupation trains also ran on this route.

In 1878/79 the Treysa–Lollar section of the line was incorporated into the strategic railway known as the Kanonenbahn ("Cannons Railway") built between Berlin and Metz.

During the 1960s, the first section of the line was electrified between Frankfurt and Giessen; electrification of the line was completed on 20 March 1967.

The line was moved in the Kassel area in the second half of the 1980s in preparation for the construction of the Hanover–Würzburg high-speed railway. Construction began in July 1985. 420,000 square metres (500,000 sq yd) of soil was excavated over a length of 5.7 kilometres (3.5 mi) and relocated at a cost of DM 24.0 million. Operations on two tracks were maintained throughout.

Operation Steel Box also took place on the line in September 1990.

=== Quadruplication between Frankfurt and Friedberg ===
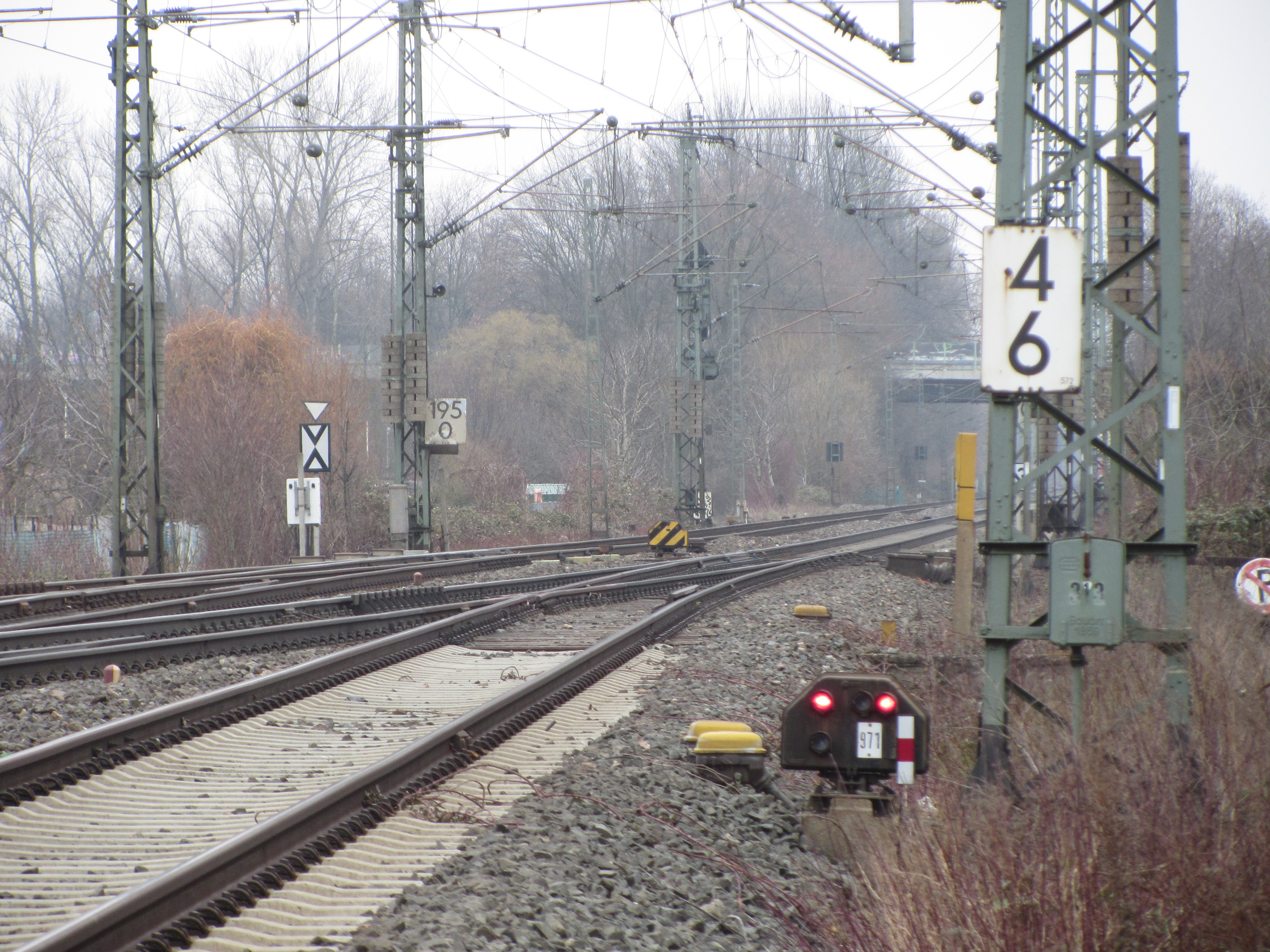
Preliminary end of S-Bahn line 3684 at km 4.6 in Frankfurt-Bockenheim

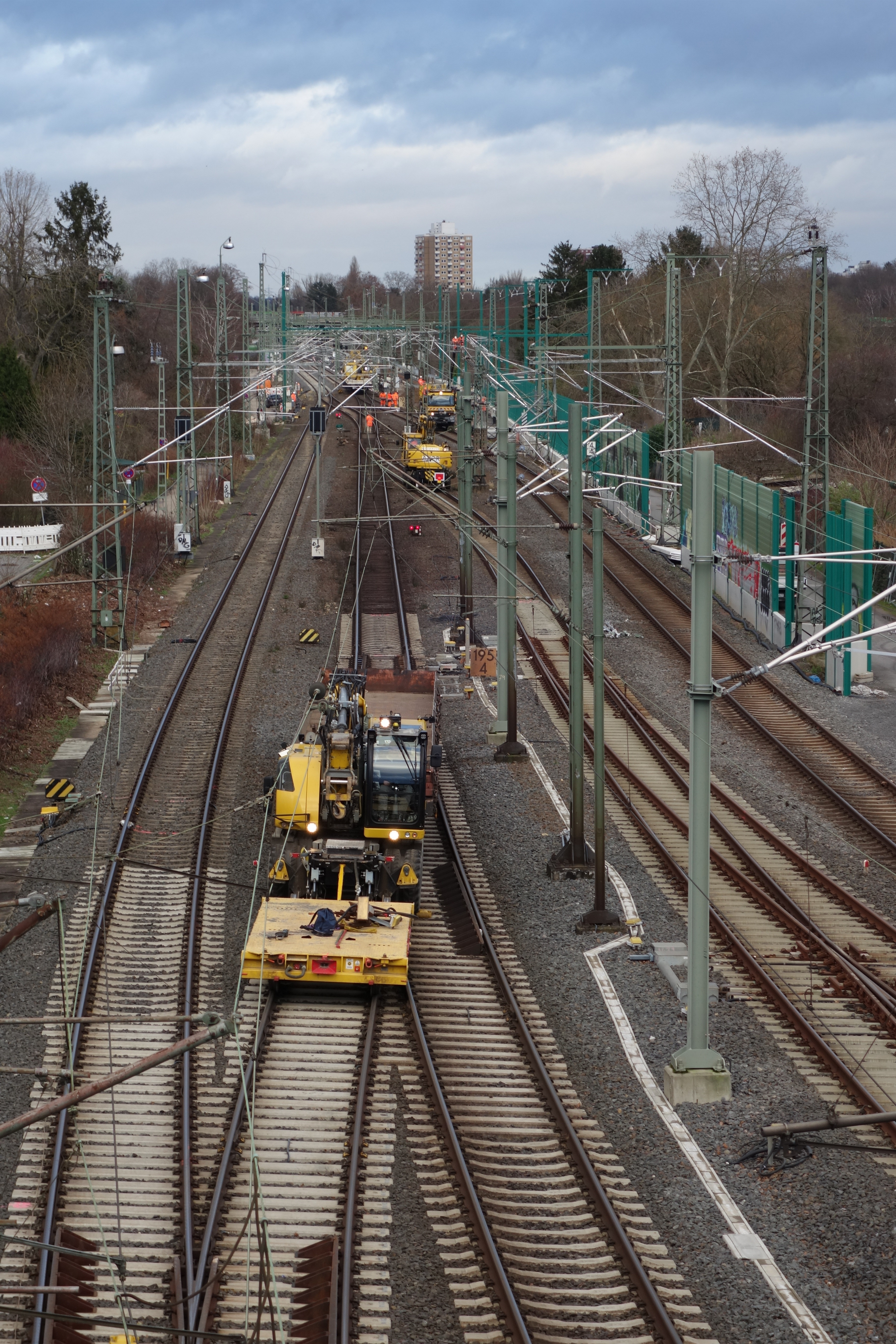
View from Breitenbachbrücke (Breitenbach bridge) upon Main–Weser Railway during quadruplication works (January 2024)

Before 2024, between Frankfurt West and Friedberg, S-Bahn, Regional, and long-distance services and freight traffic shared the two tracks of the Main–Weser railway. To separate operations, the track in this area are being rebuilt as four tracks in two stages, after which two separate tracks will be available for the S-Bahn. The line speed are being raised to 140 km/h on both the S-Bahn and the long-distance tracks.

The two tracks for the S-Bahn are arranged east or south of the tracks of route 3900 and have been given the new route number of 3684. While the chainage (kilometre markings) on route 3900 (Main-Weser-Bahn) is measured from Kassel in the north–south direction, the chainage on the new line for the S-Bahn is measured from Frankfurt Hauptbahnhof in the south–north direction.

The planning approval process for the development of the first section from Frankfurt West to Bad Vilbel (with a planned construction period of four years) was completed on 13 May 2004, but not implemented. It was later amended by a planning change under section 76 subsection 1 of the Administrative Procedure Act (Verwaltungsverfahrensgesetz). This was publicly announced in July 2009. As a result, the track would be largely equipped with two to six metre-high noise barriers, as a compensatory measure, and an old arm of the Nidda would be restored to a more natural condition.

The citizens' initiative 2statt4 was formed by some residents of Eschersheim and Ginnheim to oppose the whole upgrade through the courts. However, the approval of the work was already in effect in the Bad Vilbel area, so that the municipality of Bad Vilbel was able to proceed with a planned new underpass under the platforms.

In November 2011, the Hessian Administrative Court (Hessische Verwaltungsgerichtshof, VGH) dismissed complaints from residents and the citizens' initiative 2statt4 against the planning approval decision and an appeal was not permitted. Previously, Deutsche Bahn had promised improvements.

The citizens' initiative Bahnane and a private claimant subsequently appealed against the VGH judgment. In various judgments, the Federal Administrative Court dismissed the appeals at the end of January 2013, with the final construction rights now being granted for the first phase of construction.

In May 2015, Deutsche Bahn announced that construction would start in the second half of 2017. In addition to the construction of 12.6 kilometres of new tracks, 5 stations would be rebuilt and a new station would be built. The cost of the project was stated to be €323 million. The upgrade was originally planned to be completed in December 2022, but it was opened more than a year later in February 2024.

=== New Frankfurt-Ginnheim station ===
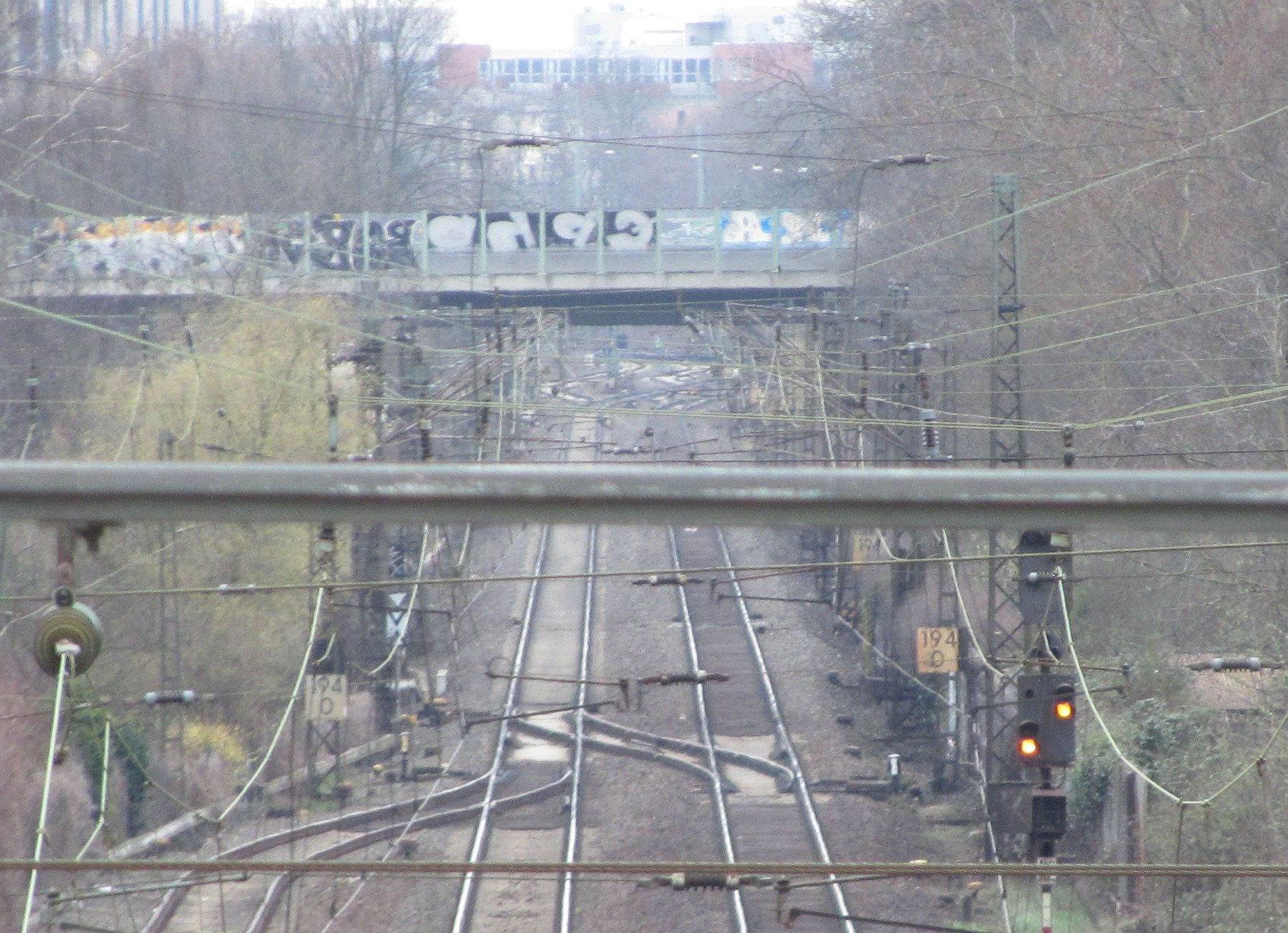
View from the pedestrian walkway of the Niddapark U-Bahn station to the south, where the beginning of the Ginnheim overtaking loop can be seen at km 194.0

During the construction of the S-Bahn line along the Main–Weser railway a new Frankfurt-Ginnheim was built between Frankfurt West and Frankfurt-Eschersheim for the S-Bahn, which allows for a change to U-Bahn line U1 and U9. This was the location of the operating point of Ginnheim, consisting of an overtaking loop towards Kassel from km 194.0 to 193.2, which was abandoned for the construction of the tracks for the S-Bahn. It was the location of a temporary stop for visitors to the Federal Garden Show in 1989, which became the site of Nidda Park. The station was opened in October 2024.

== Operations ==
=== Long-distance services ===
Services of Intercity-Express line 26 run on the Main–Weser Railway from Ostseebad Binz or Hamburg-Altona via Kassel and Frankfurt to Karlsruhe at two-hour intervals. Services on EuroCity line 62 also ran on the Gießen – Frankfurt section from December 2009 to December 2011. Until 2014 there were services that ran over the line to Konstanz, but these were cancelled at the timetable change at the end of 2014. There was also a direct connection to Berlin Südkreuz until the end of 2015, which was the first Intercity service on the line from Monday to Saturday. Since then, this IC service runs to Hamburg like the others.

Even earlier there were direct long-distance services from Frankfurt via Gießen and Siegen to Hagen Hauptbahnhof and beyond to Münster and Norddeich Mole. One train even went to Copenhagen.

=== Regional services ===
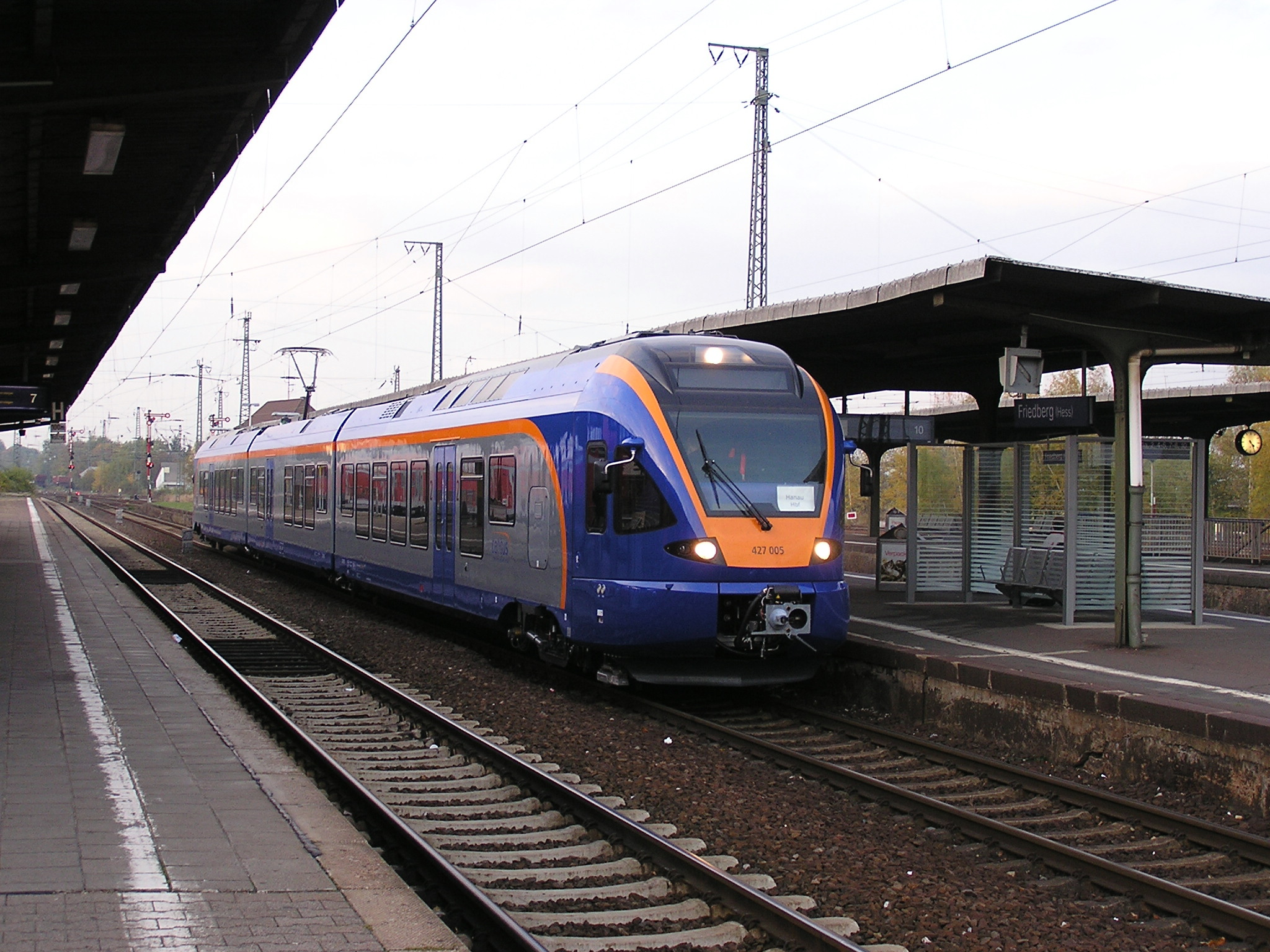
cantus regional service on a staff training operation in Friedberg (2006), running to North Hesse

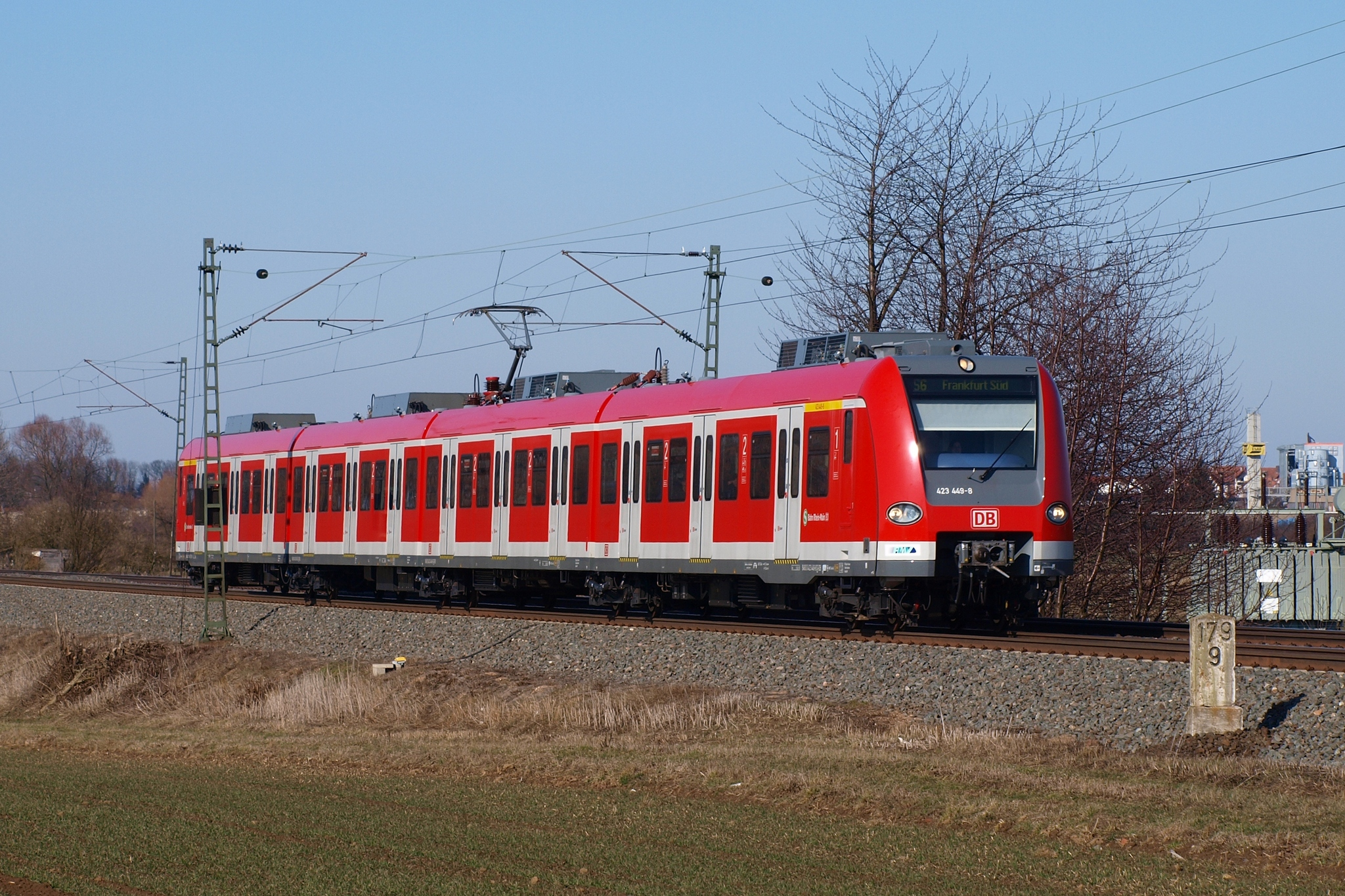
Class 423 set as S6 near Groß Karben

Regional-Express services run between Frankfurt and Kassel (Main-Weser-Express) and between Frankfurt and Siegen (Main-Sieg-Express). The latter leaves the line in Gießen, where they have to reverse to continue towards Siegen.

The Main-Weser-Express runs hourly and is operated alternatively by DB Regio as line 30 and by the Hessische Landesbahn (HLB) as line 98, but the latter service does not always go through to Kassel and has more intermediate stops. The Main-Sieg-Express is exclusively operated by the Hessischen Landesbahn as line 99 operated and runs on the Frankfurt-Gießen section at two-hour intervals, mostly in coupled-sets, together with line 98, with trains dividing in Gießen. It is also served by Regionalbahn services operated by DB Regio between Marburg and Gießen as well as between Gießen and Hanau via Friedberg. Since December 2006, Mittelhessen-Express services are formed in Gießen from two coupled Regionalbahn trains coming from Treysa and Dillenburg and then together run to Frankfurt at a higher speed. In the opposite direction, the uncoupling of the sets also takes place in Gießen, with both trains then continuing as Regionalbahn trains to Treysa or Dillenburg. There is also an S-Bahn service between Friedberg and Frankfurt South station via the City-Tunnel.

The Treysa–Kassel section was operated until December 2015 as part of Kassel RegioTram and was designated as line RT 9. The weekend RegioTram services were, however, replaced by Regionalbahn services on at the end of May 2007, and services on working days were also later replaced as well. Since 14 December 2014, two of three services have been operated on weekdays by Kurhessenbahn (a Deutsche Bahn brand) using class 628 diesel multiple unit sets. FLIRT multiple units operated by Hessische Landesbahn replaced the RegioTrams on line RT 9 at the 2015/2016 timetable change on 13 December 2015.

Numerous trains that branch off on branch lines at Bad Vilbel, Friedberg, Gießen, Cölbe, and Wabern also run for a while on the mainline.

Many freight trains also run on the line, including numerous container trains or trains carrying new agricultural machinery (such as tractors and combine harvesters). Military trains also regularly use the line.

=== Rolling stock used ===
==== Main line ====
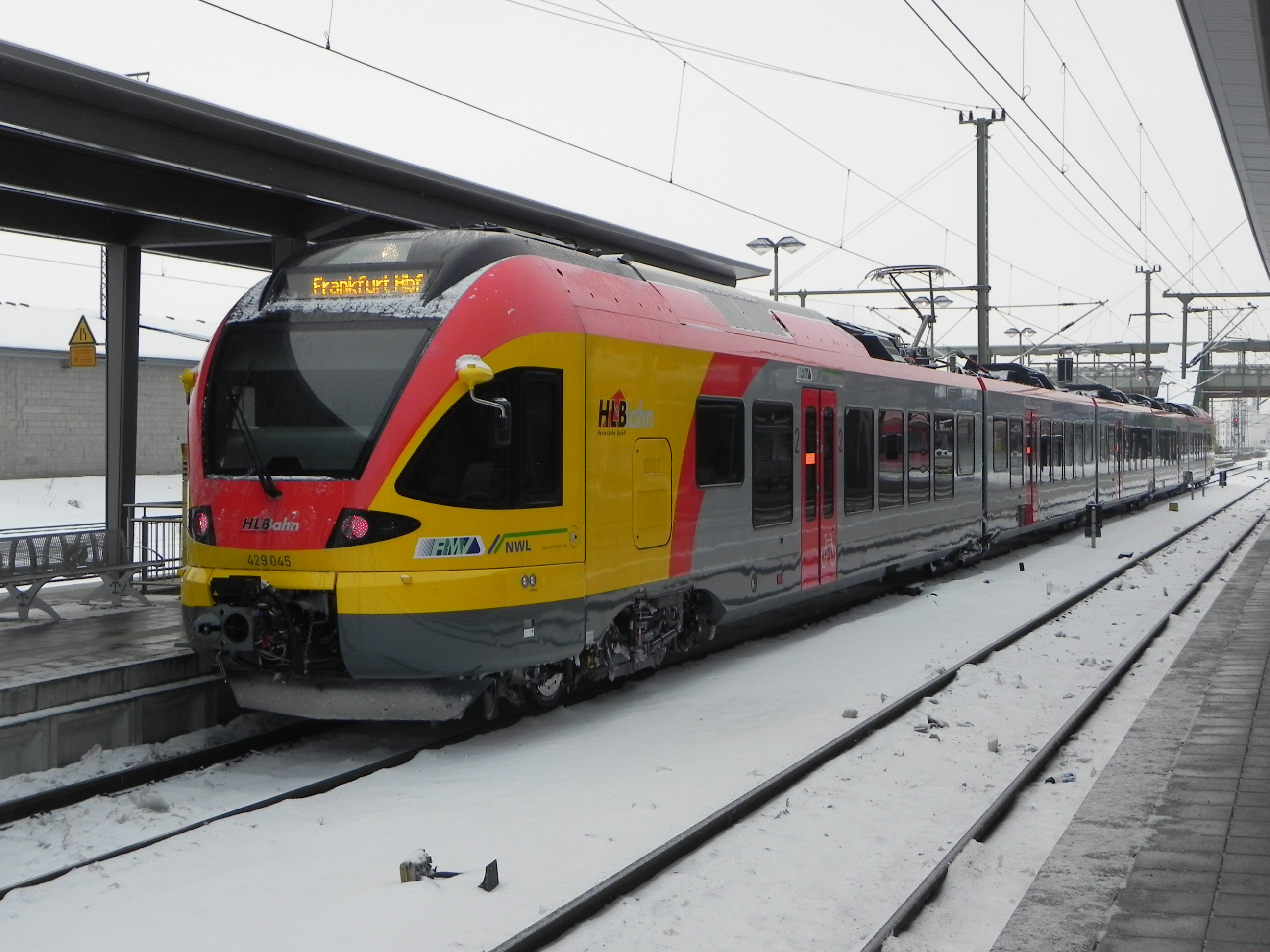
Five-part FLIRT of the HLB in Gießen

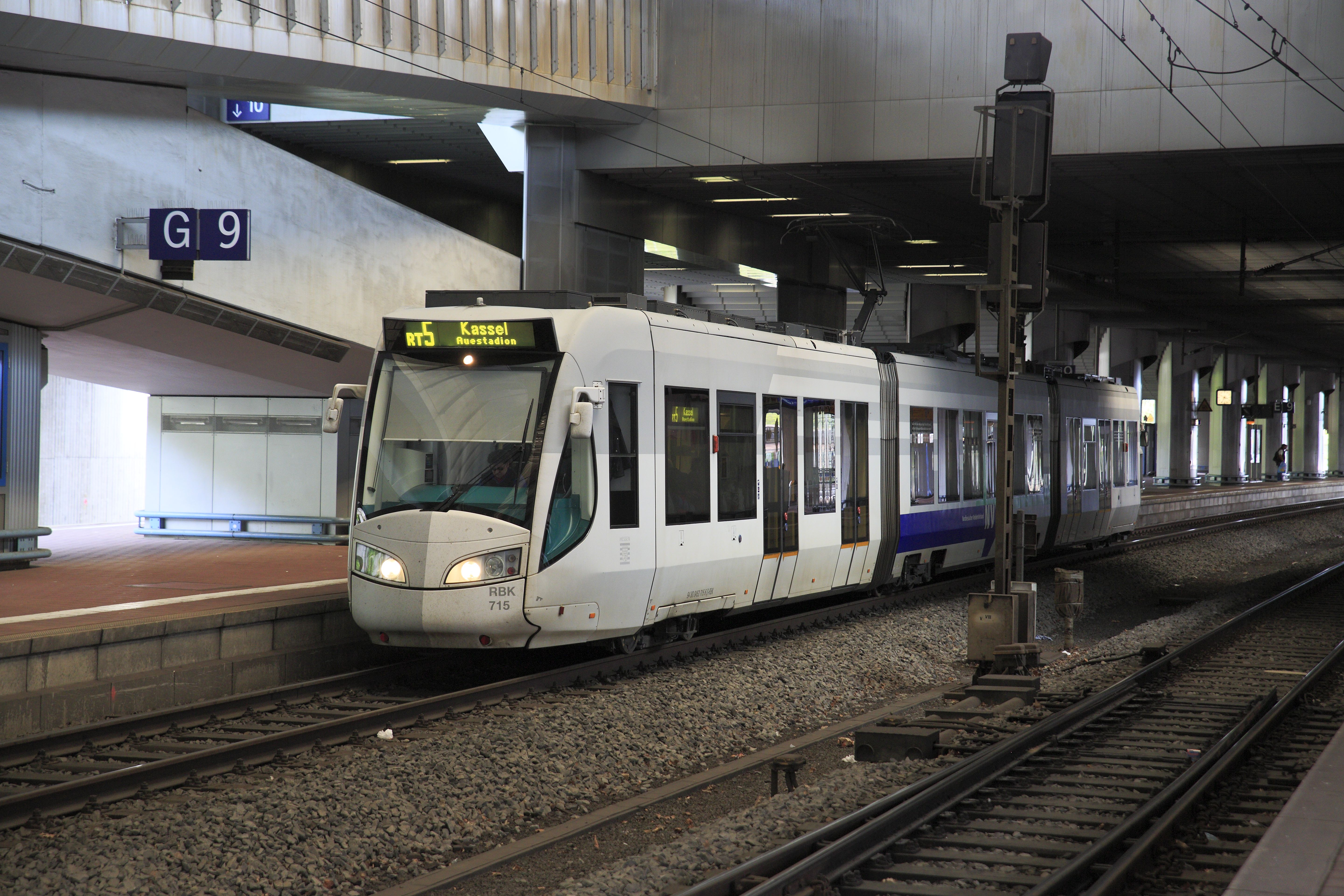
RegioCitadis as RegioTram on line RT 5 in Kassel-Wilhelmshöhe station

Talent 2 electric multiple units are used for the hourly Mittelhessen-Express between Frankfurt and Treysa, which are operated by DB Regio Mitte. Talent-2 sets have run since March 2013 on the through Gießen–Friedberg–Hanau Regionalbahn service, which has operated since December 2012. These sets replaced Silberling carriages hauled by class 143 locomotives or GTW 2/6 sets operated by Hessische Landesbahn. Class 143 locomotives occasionally haul modernised Silberling carriages between Gießen and Marburg, Kirchhain and Treysa in the peak hours.

The DB Regional-Express services between Frankfurt and Kassel are almost exclusively operated as double-deck push-pull trains, hauled by Bombardier TRAXX (class 146) locomotives. At the 2010/2011 timetable change, Hessische Landesbahn (HLB) took over the operation of some services between Frankfurt am Main, Marburg and Siegen, branded as the Main-Sieg-Express, on behalf of the Rhein-Main-Verkehrsverbund (Rhine-Main Transport Association) and the Zweckverband Nahverkehr Westphalen-Lippe (municipal association for local transport of Westphalia-Lippe). Newly procured three and five-part Stadler Flirt railcars are used. These partly replaced Deutsche Bahn's double-deck push-pull trains and rebuilt Silberling carriages. The trains are usually uncoupled in Gießen with portions continuing to Marburg and Siegen.

The RegioTram service that ran between Kassel and Treysa until December 2015 consisted of a low-floor RegioCitadis (class 452). The S6 S-Bahn section south of Friedberg is operated by class 423 S-Bahn sets.

The ICE line 26 trains consist of ICE T sets. Occasionally, during construction or breakdowns on the Hanover–Würzburg high-speed railway, Intercity-Express services are also diverted between Frankfurt (Main) Hauptbahnhof and Kassel-Wilhelmshöhe, which as a result do not stop in Fulda and Hanau. Freight traffic is also operated in the form of end-to-end trains by various railway companies.

Line	Route		Operating interval			Rolling stock used	Operator
Line	Route		Peak hour	Shoulder	Off-peak	Rolling stock used	Operator
ICE 26	(Oldenburg –) Bremen – Hanover – Kassel-Wilhelmshöhe – Wabern – Treysa – Stadtallendorf – Marburg – Gießen – Friedberg – Frankfurt – Karlsruhe		240	240	240	ICE T	DB Fernverkehr AG
IC 34	(Münster – Hamm –) Dortmund – Siegen – Wetzlar – Bad Nauheim – Friedberg/Frankfurt		120	240		Intercity 2	DB Fernverkehr AG
Main-Weser-Express; RE 30	Kassel – Kassel-Wilhelmshöhe – Wabern (Bz Kassel) – Treysa – Stadtallendorf – Marburg (Lahn) – Gießen – Friedberg (Hess) – Frankfurt (Main)		120	120	120	TRAXX + 6 or 7 double-deckers	DB Regio Mitte
Main-Sieg-Express; RE 98 / RE 99	Siegen –	Gießen – Friedberg (Hess) – Frankfurt (Main)	60	60	60	5-part FLIRT	HLB
Main-Sieg-Express; RE 98 / RE 99	Kassel – Kassel-Wilhelmshöhe – Wabern (Bz Kassel) – Treysa – Stadtallendorf – Marburg (Lahn)	Gießen – Friedberg (Hess) – Frankfurt (Main)	120	120	120	5-part FLIRT	HLB
Mittelhessen-Express; RB 40 / RB 41	Treysa – Stadtallendorf – Marburg (Lahn) –	Gießen – Friedberg (Hess) – Frankfurt (Main)	30	60	60	Coradia Continental	HLB
Mittelhessen-Express; RB 40 / RB 41	Dillenburg – Herborn (Dillkr) – Wetzlar –	Gießen – Friedberg (Hess) – Frankfurt (Main)	60	60	120	Coradia Continental	HLB
RB 49	Gießen – Friedberg (Hess) – Hanau		30	60	60	Coradia Continental	HLB
RB 48	Nidda – Beienheim – Friedberg (Hess) (– Bad Vilbel – Frankfurt (Main))		30	60	60	GTW 2/6 / TRAXX (cl 245) + double-deckers (2× Mon–Fri)	HLB / DB Regio Mitte
RB 34	Glauburg-Stockheim – Bad Vilbel – Frankfurt (Main)		30	60	60	Siemens Desiro Classic / TRAXX (cl 245) + 4 double-deckers (4× Mon–Fri)	DB Regio Mitte
RB 37	Gießen – Butzbach – Friedberg (Hess) – Bad Vilbel – Frankfurt (Main)		30	120	240	Alstom Coradia Continental	HLB
RB 38	Kassel – Kassel-Wilhelmshöhe – Wabern (Bz Kassel) – Borken – Zimmersrode – Treysa		Some trains			Siemens Desiro Classic	Kurhessenbahn
RB 39	Kassel – Kassel-Wilhelmshöhe – Wabern (Bz Kassel) – Fritzlar – Bad Wildungen		120	120	120	GTW 2/6	Kurhessenbahn
S6 (Rhine-Main S-Bahn)	Friedberg (Hess) – Bad Vilbel – Frankfurt Hbf (underground) – Frankfurt South – Langen – Darmstadt		15	15	30	423 1 - 3	DB Regio Mitte
RT 5	Kassel Auestadion – Kassel – Kassel-Wilhelmshöhe – Baunatal-Guntershausen – Melsungen		30	30	60	Alstom RegioCitadis	RegioTram Gesellschaft

==== Feeder services ====
The trains that connect Glauburg-Stockheim and Nidderau with Frankfurt over the Nidda Valley Railway, as well as Nidda to Frankfurt via Friedberg, are hauled by TRAXX (class 245) diesel locomotives in the peak hour, otherwise Desiro (class 642) railcars are used. Class 628 diesel railcars are found between Cölbe and Marburg, sometimes also running to Gießen, which serve the Kreuztal–Cölbe railway to Erndtebrück and the Warburg–Sarnau railway to Frankenberg (Eder). Most trains on the Edersee Railway (Ederseebahn, Bad Wildungen–Wabern) continue over the Main–Weser Railway to Kassel Hbf.

== Planned development ==
Between Bad Vilbel and Friedberg (and before 2024 between Frankfurt West and Bad Vilbel), S-Bahn, Regional, and long-distance services and freight traffic share the two tracks of the Main–Weser railway. To separate operations, the track in this area is being rebuilt as four tracks in two stages, after which two separate tracks will be available for the S-Bahn. The line speed will be raised to 140 km/h on both the S-Bahn and the long-distance tracks. The first stage between Frankfurt West and Bad Vilbel was completed in 2024. Work on the second stage is expected to commence in 2026.

=== Quadruplication between Gießen and Friedberg ===
The draft of the new regional plan for Central Hesse includes the goal of a quadruplication between Gießen and Friedberg.

=== New station in Marburg ===
A new regional train stop, "Marburg Mitte," located near the university high-rise buildings, was initially assessed in a report in 2020 and received a positive evaluation. This was also confirmed by a joint feasibility study conducted by the City of Marburg and the Rhine-Main Transport Association, which was published at the end of January 2026. The stop was deemed to have a significant impact on transport, a positive economic benefit, and was deemed eligible for funding. The standardised cost-benefit analysis yielded a high score of 2.33.

The study examined various options for the location of the platforms. A position near the Kurt-Schumacher Bridge was identified as the preferred solution, as it best meets the basic requirements and ensures good pedestrian accessibility. Furthermore, the project aims to expand transfer options between bus and rail. The city of Marburg concluded, upon announcing the results of the feasibility study, that the project could currently be implemented in the context of the planned general renovation of the Main-Weser railway line for 2034.
