= Marburg (Lahn) station =

Railway station in Marburg, Germany

Marburg (Lahn)
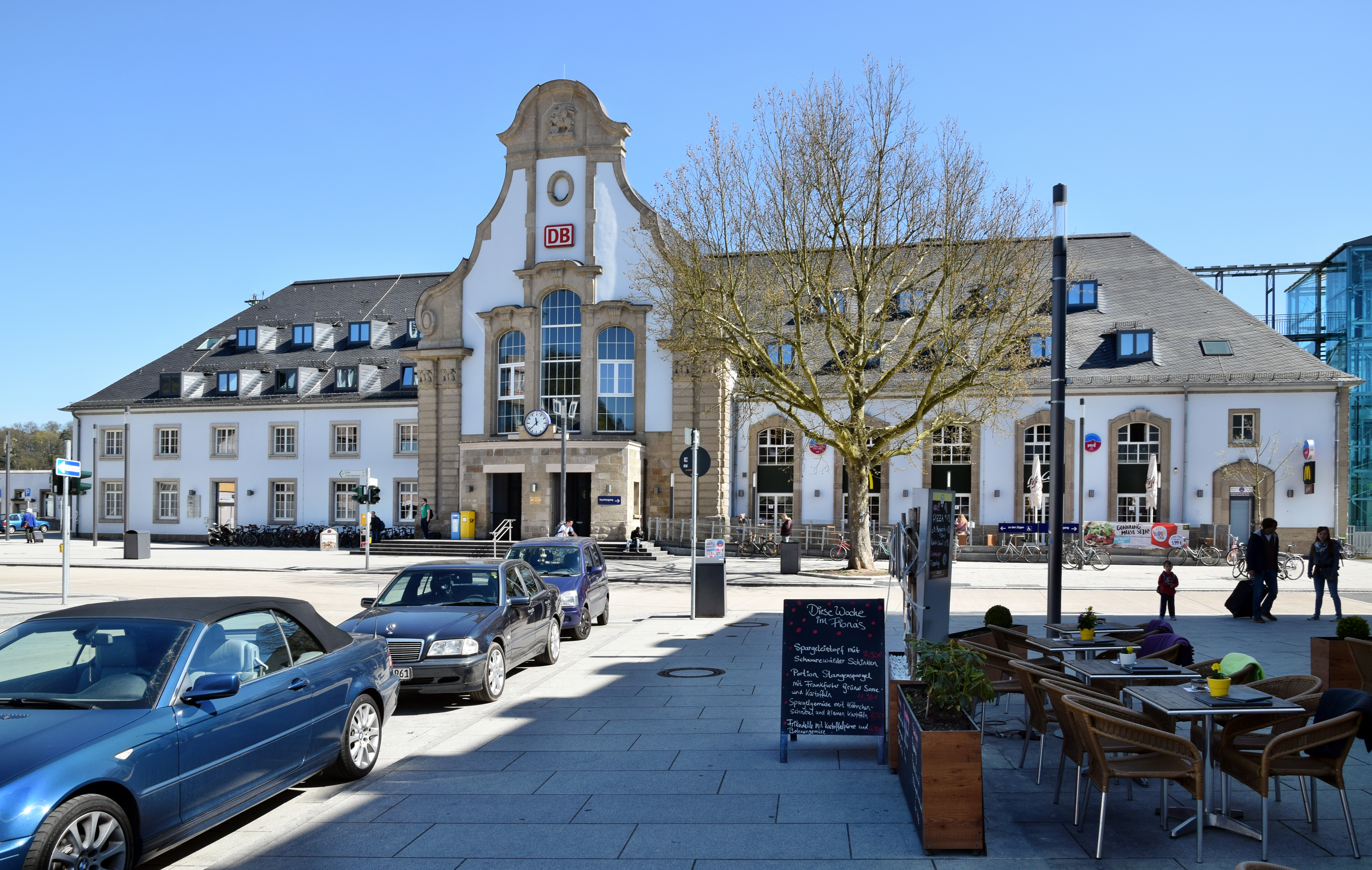

General information
- Location: Bahnhofstr. 33; Marburg, Hesse; Germany
- Coordinates: 50°49′12″N 8°46′30″E
- Owner: Deutsche Bahn
- Operator: DB Netz; DB Station&Service
- Lines: Main-Weser Railway (104.2 km); Upper Lahn Valley Railway (92.4 km); Burgwald Railway (108.3 km)
- Platforms: 6

Construction
- Accessible: Yes
- Architect: Alois Holtmeyer
- Architectural style: Baroque Revival

Other information
- Station code: 3943
- DS100 code: FMBG
- IBNR: 8000337
- Category: 3
- Fare zone: : 0501
- Website: www.bahnhof.de

History
- Opened: 1850

Passengers
- About 12,000

Services
Preceding station	DB Fernverkehr	Following station
Treysa towards Westerland (Sylt)	ICE 24	Gießen towards Frankfurt (Main) Hbf
Treysa towards Bremen Hbf	ICE 26	Gießen towards Karlsruhe Hbf
Preceding station	DB Regio Mitte	Following station
Kirchhain (Bz Kassel) towards Kassel Hbf	RE 30	Gießen towards Frankfurt (Main) Hbf
Cölbe towards Treysa	RB 41	Marburg Süd towards Frankfurt (Main) Hbf
Preceding station	Hessische Landesbahn	Following station
Kirchhain (Bz Kassel) towards Kassel Hbf	RE 98	Marburg Süd towards Frankfurt (Main) Hbf
Preceding station	Kurhessenbahn	Following station
Cölbe towards Erndtebrück	RB 94	Terminus
Cölbe towards Brilon Stadt	RE 97	Terminus
Cölbe towards Brilon Stadt	RB 97	Terminus
Location
- Location within Hesse Location within Germany Location within Europe

Marburg (Lahn) station is a through station at the 104.3 km mark of the Main-Weser Railway in the north-east of the city of Marburg in the German state of Hesse and is used daily by about 12,000 people. The station is classified by Deutsche Bahn (DB) as a category 3 station.

== History ==
The station was completed with the construction of the Main-Weser Railway in 1850 and was built outside the built up area of the city on the other side of the Lahn.

Since 1903, the Marburg tramway has ended at the station. Initially it was a horse-drawn tram, which was converted to electric operation in 1911. After the Second World War, it was decided against continued operation and the tram ceased operations in 1951. A short time later, the Marburg trolleybus, which replaced the tram, opened. This was finally discontinued in 1968.

In 1945, the station was severely damaged several times by air raids and dropped bombs, and in some cases it was completely destroyed. The main goals for the railways here were to maintain the through tracks and the locomotive depot. Nevertheless, until the arrival of American forces on 28 March 1945, a makeshift train service was maintained.

On 20 March 1967, the station was electrified and the railway facilities modernised. The pushbutton signal box, completed in 1969, was also put into operation. It replaced the two mechanical interlockings in the station and is still in operation today.

The entrance building, the rollingstock depot and the area surrounding the station were redesigned between 2009 and 2015 for a total of €11m. Among other things, the station forecourt was traffic-calmed and traffic between the toen centre and Neuer Kasseler Strasse no longer flows directly in front of the station building, but instead uses Ernst-Giller-Strasse. Service facilities were built on the upper floors of the station. Construction work on the entrance building began on 3 December 2009. The groundbreaking ceremony for the work on the station forecourt took place in October 2010 and the routing of traffic was changed in the first construction phase up the end of 2011. The overall project was completed in spring 2015, and the official inauguration took place on 22 May.

== Entrance building ==
The first station building was designed by Julius Eugen Ruhl. In 1907 it was replaced during an expansion of the station with an entrance building designed by the architect Alois Holtmeyer. The station building was severely damaged in the Second World War and its Baroque Revival exterior form was largely restored after the war.

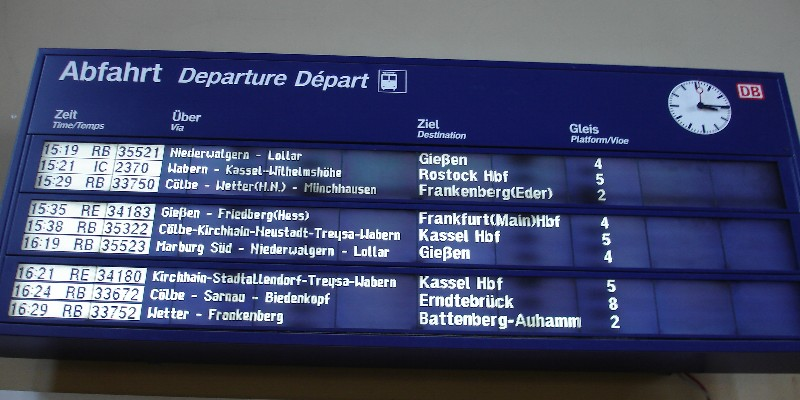
Modern information display

In 2004, the station was equipped with digital information displays on the platforms and in the entrance building and was declared to be a smoke-free station.

The entrance building and the rest of the station buildings are now mostly listed as a monument under the Hessian Heritage Act. In the eastern area of the station is the former—now abandoned—operations depot. These include several in brick buildings built in 1890, including a roundhouse.

== Infrastructure ==
Marburg station is managed by DB Station&Service and classified as a category 3 station. The station is served by many regional and city bus routes.

East of the passenger station is the disused freight yard, which consisted of a small marshalling yard (with a hump and four short sidings), and north of it are disused loading tracks.

The station has six platform tracks. The continuing services on the Main-Weser Railways stop at platforms 4 and 5 and the terminating traffic on the Burgwald Railway from Marburg to Frankenberg (Eder) and the Upper Lahn Valley Railway from Erndtebrück stop on tracks 1, 2 and 8. Track 1a is used exclusively by trains to and from Gießen that start or end at Marburg.

== Operations ==
=== Long-distance services ===
Already in the 1980s and 1990s were Intercity services that stopped once a day in Marburg. In 2002, InterRegio services on the Main-Weser Railway were reclassified as intercity services. Marburg is now on the Intercity network on the route between Karlsruhe and Bremen (before 2026 it ran to/from Hamburg). These services have been operated as Intercity-Express services since 2018. The station is served at 4-hour intervals.

Line	Route	Frequency
ICE 24	Westerland – Hamburg – Hanover – Kassel-Wilhelmshöhe – Marburg – Frankfurt	1 train pair
ICE 26	Bremen – Hanover – Kassel-Wilhelmshöhe – Marburg – Friedberg – Frankfurt – Heidelberg – Karlsruhe	Every four hours

=== Regional services ===
The station is served on the Main-Weser Railway by the Main-Weser-Express service (Regional-Express 30) on the Frankfurt–Kassel route, the Mittelhessen-Express (RB 41) and the RE 98 (Main-Sieg-Express). The station is the terminus for the Upper Lahn Valley Railway (which is served by the RB 94) and the Burgwald Railway (which is served by the RE/RB 97 (Lahn-Sauerland-Express), both branching off the Main-Weser Railway in Cölbe. The trains on the closed Aar-Salzböde Railway sometimes ran to Marburg, but usually they ended at the junction station of Niederwalgern. Since December 2010, the Main-Sieg-Express has operated from Marburg to Frankfurt.
