= Haiger station =

Railway station in Haiger, Germany

Haiger
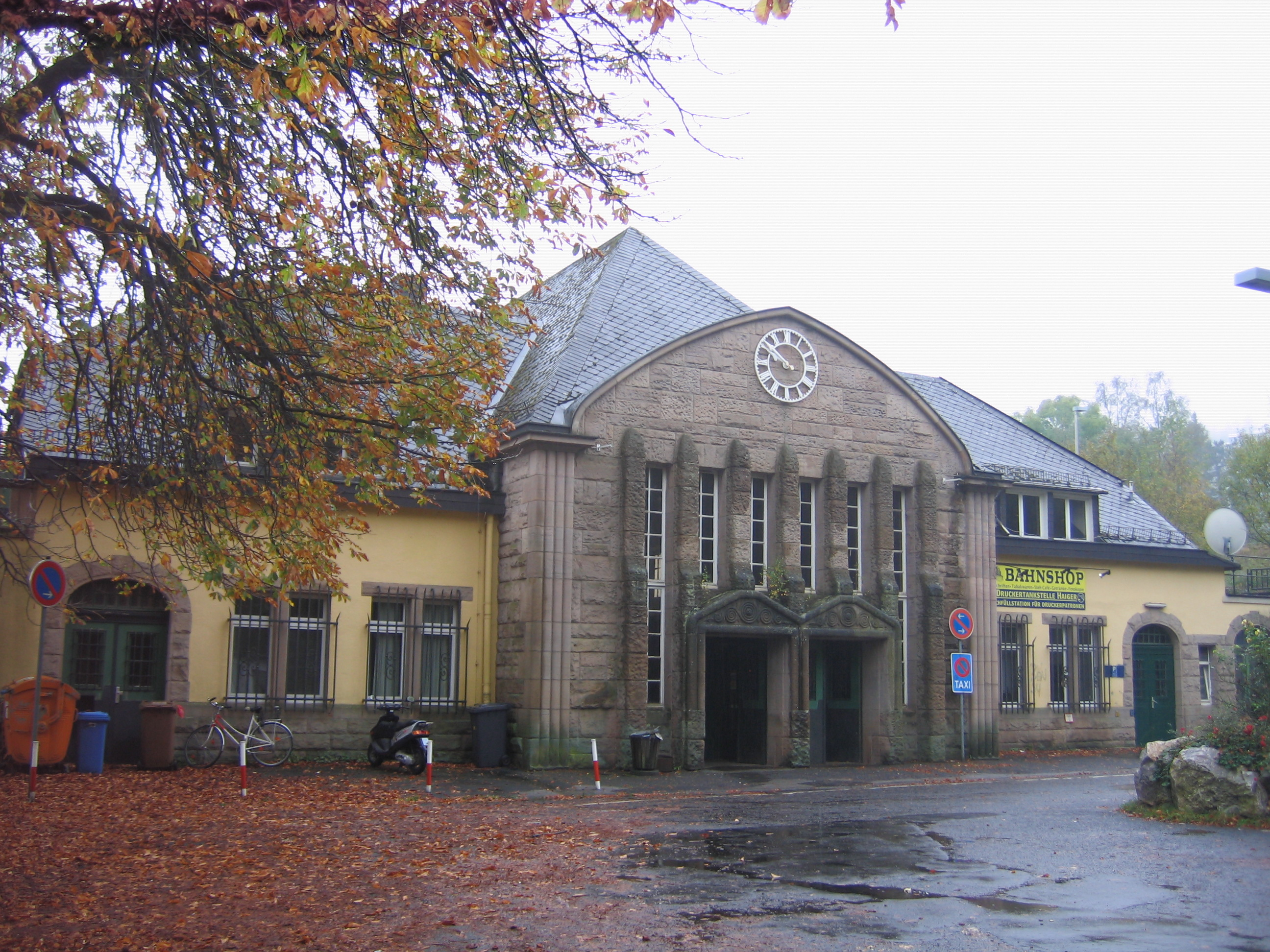
- Haiger station from the street

General information
- Location: Bahnhofstr. 1, Haiger, Hesse; Germany
- Coordinates: 50°44′29″N 8°13′16″E
- Lines: Dill Railway (KBS 445); Heller Valley Railway (KBS 462); Haiger–Breitscheid railway
- Platforms: 3

Construction
- Accessible: Platform 101 only
- Architect: Ludwig Hofmann
- Architectural style: Neoclassical / Art Nouveau

Other information
- Station code: 2475
- DS100 code: FHG
- IBNR: 8000386
- Category: 5
- Fare zone: : 5847; Westfalentarif: 86600 (RMV transitional tariff)
- Website: www.bahnhof.de

History
- Opened: 1862 / 1913

Services
Preceding station	Hessische Landesbahn	Following station
Siegen Hbf Terminus	RE 99	Dillenburg towards Frankfurt (Main) Hbf
Rodenbach towards Siegen Hbf	RB 95	Sechshelden towards Dillenburg
Haiger Obertor towards Betzdorf (Sieg)	RB 96	Sechshelden towards Dillenburg
Location

Haiger station serves the town of Haiger in the Lahn-Dill-Kreis of the German state of Hesse. The first station at this point was opened 1862 when the Cologne-Minden Railway Company built the Deutz–Gießen railway, connecting Cologne-Deutz with Gießen. The station became more important when the direct connection was opened to Siegen (now considered part of the Dill line) in 1915.

== Reception building ==
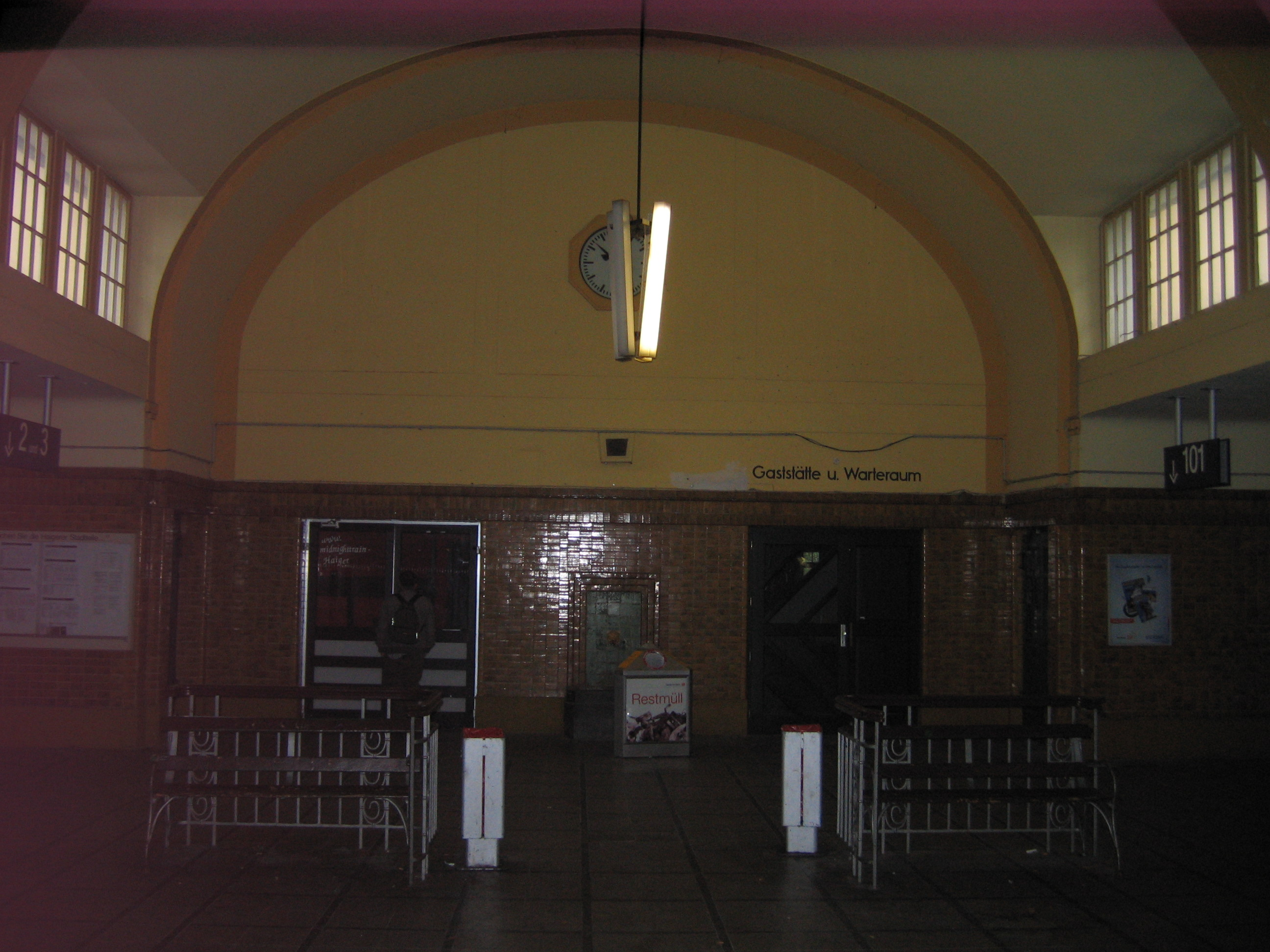
Station hall

Between 1911 and 1913 a new station building was built as a “wedge station” (Keilbahnhof) between the old line (now the Heller Valley Railway) and the new line to Siegen. The architect was perhaps Ludwig Hoffmann. The station is located between the two converging railways, which are elevated, allowing the platform subways to be accessed from street level. The facade and much of the buildings themselves are designed around a central axis of symmetry. The façade is dominated by a central projection of yellow sandstone. The ensemble is composed of a mixture of classical elements and Art Nouveau. The station is situated at an altitude of 270 m above sea level. The reception building currently appears neglected and its sidings give the impression of a brownfield.

== Lines ==
Haiger station is on the Siegen–Gießen main line (Dill line) and the Heller Valley Railway from Haiger to Betzdorf, now classified as a single track main line, which was originally part of the Deutz–Giessen line. A third line, the Haiger–Breitscheid line, is closed.
