= Betzdorf (Sieg) station =

Railway station in Germany

Betzdorf (Sieg)
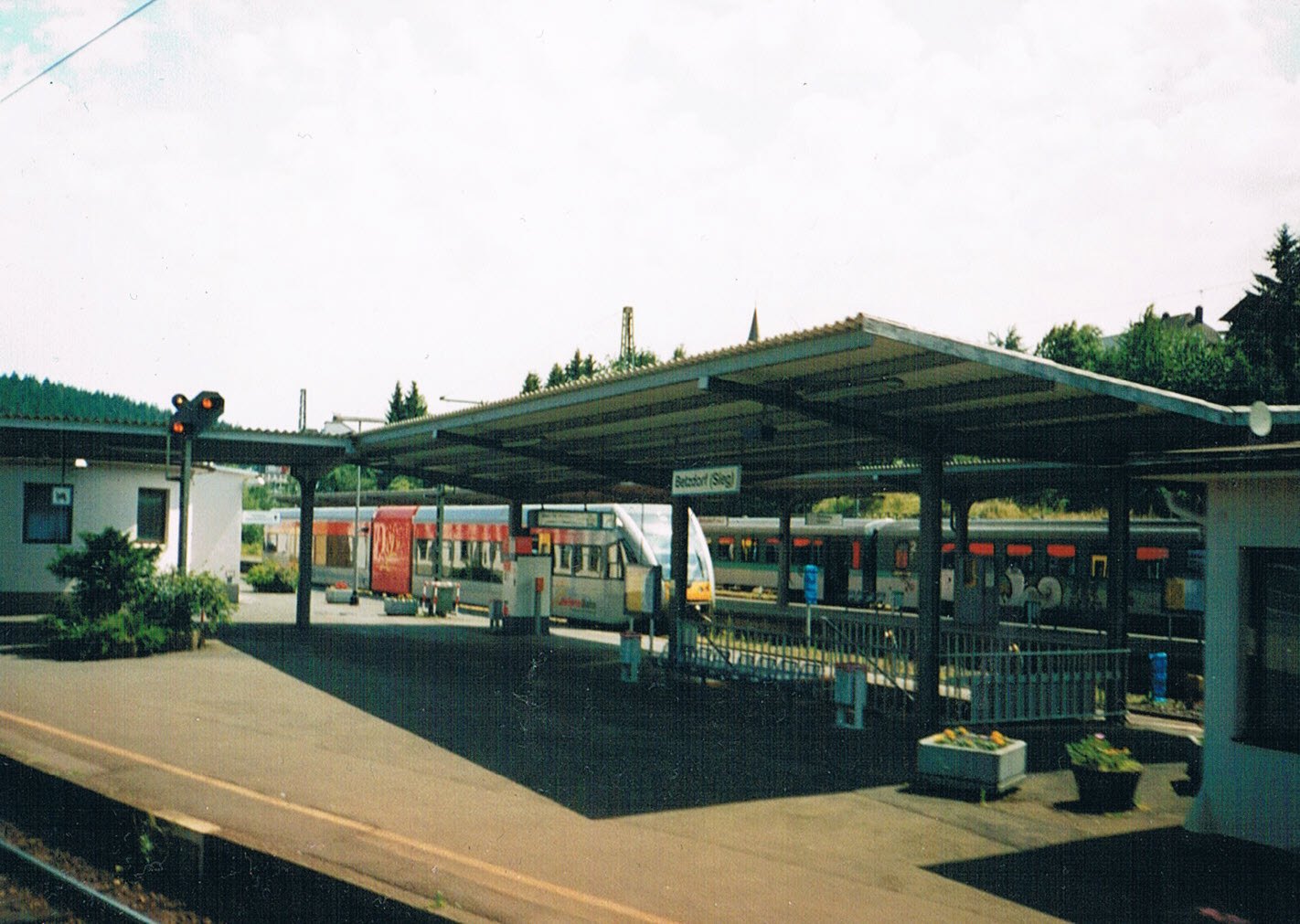
- Betzdorf station in July 2001

General information
- Location: Bahnhofstr. 1, Betzdorf, Rhineland-Palatinate; Germany
- Coordinates: 50°47′22″N 7°52′11″E
- Lines: Sieg Railway (km 123.1) (KBS 460); Betzdorf–Haiger (km 82.9) (KBS 462); Betzdorf–Daaden (km 0.0) (KBS 463)
- Platforms: 5

Construction
- Accessible: Yes

Other information
- Station code: 597
- DS100 code: EBZ
- IBNR: 8000351
- Category: 3
- Fare zone: VRM: 926; VRS: 2958; Westfalentarif: 87500
- Website: www.bahnhof.de

History
- Opened: 10 January 1861
- Former names: Erbach

Services
Preceding station	DB Regio NRW	Following station
Wissen (Sieg) towards Aachen Hbf	RE 9	Kirchen towards Siegen Hbf
Preceding station	Hessische Landesbahn	Following station
Scheuerfeld (Sieg) towards Limburg (Lahn)	RB 90	Kirchen towards Siegen Hbf
Terminus	RB 93	Kirchen towards Bad Berleburg
Terminus	RB 96	Grünebacherhütte towards Dillenburg
Preceding station	Westerwaldbahn	Following station
Terminus	RB 97	Alsdorf (Westerw) towards Daaden
Location
- Location within Rhineland-Palatinate

Betzdorf (Sieg) station is in the town of Betzdorf in the German state of Rhineland-Palatinate. It is on the Sieg Railway (Siegstrecke) and is the starting point of the Betzdorf–Haiger railway to Haiger/Dillenburg and the Betzdorf–Daaden railway to Daaden.

== History ==
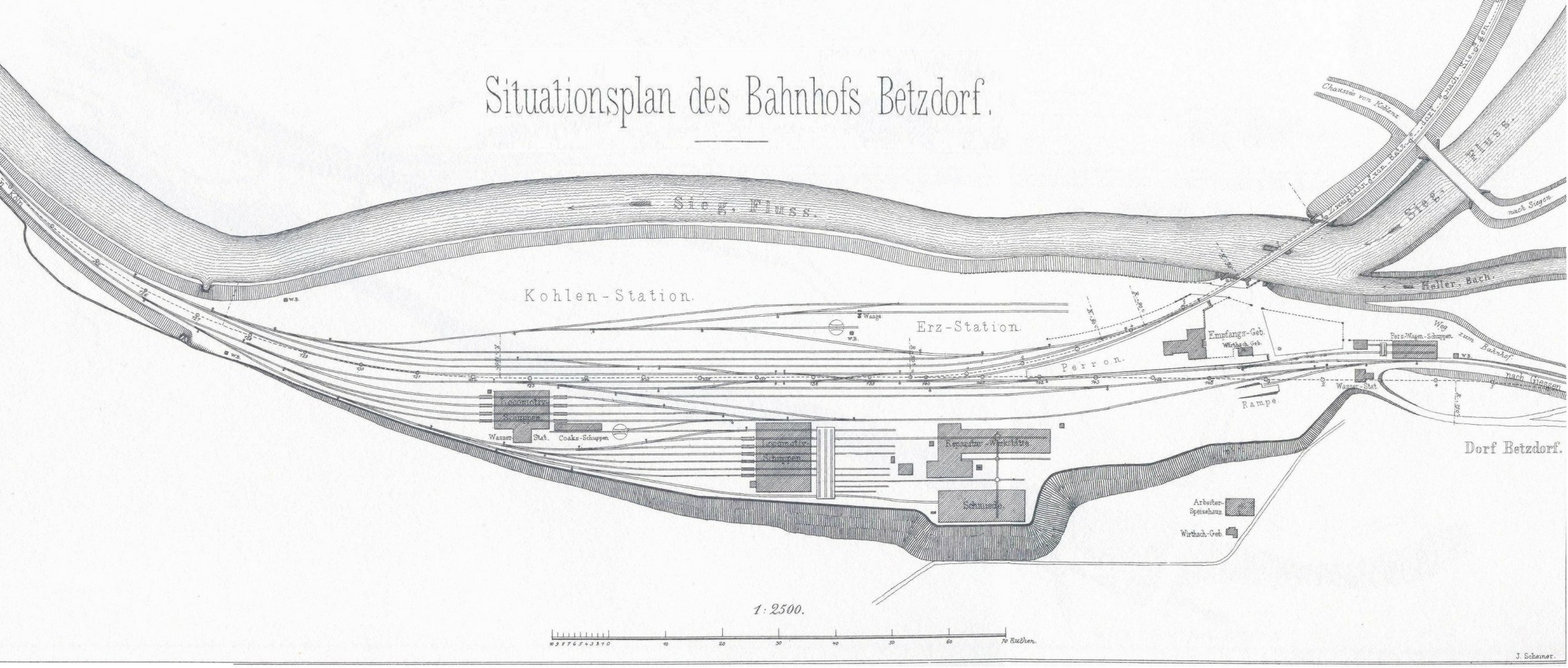
Betzdorf station in 1862

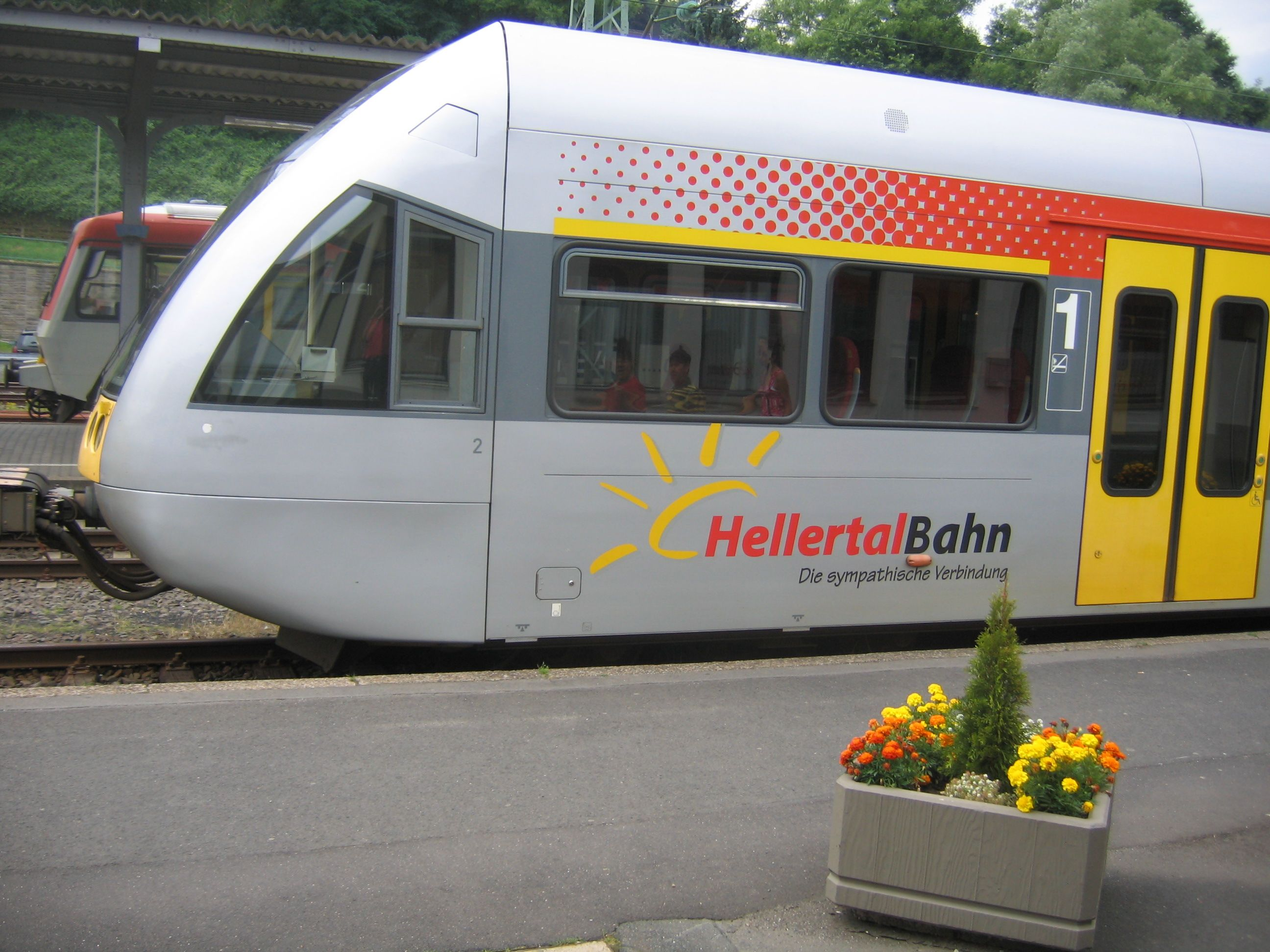
Stadler GTW of the former railway company Hellertalbahn (company) in Betzdorf (Sieg) station

The construction of the station began with the construction of the Köln-Deutz–Gießen railway and the branch line from Betzdorf to Siegen on 10 January 1861. As a result of the construction of the two lines, Betzdorf became a railway junction and railway town. It had a marshalling yard to serve the surrounding iron ore mines and it grew rapidly.

Its importance as a railway junction meant that the town and station suffered severe air raids during the Second World War, resulting in two thirds of the town being destroyed by bombing. In one raid, on 12 March 1945, 61 people were killed. This attack was carried out by the US Eighth Air Force with B-17 bombers.

From the mid 1950s, almost all of Betzdorf’s railway tracks and facilities were closed, including the repair shop, the locomotive depot, the Deutsche Bundesbahn operations office, the marshalling yard, the track maintenance office, the signalling maintenance office, the station administration and the freight handling facilities, so now Betzdorf is only a junction for passenger services.

== Infrastructure ==
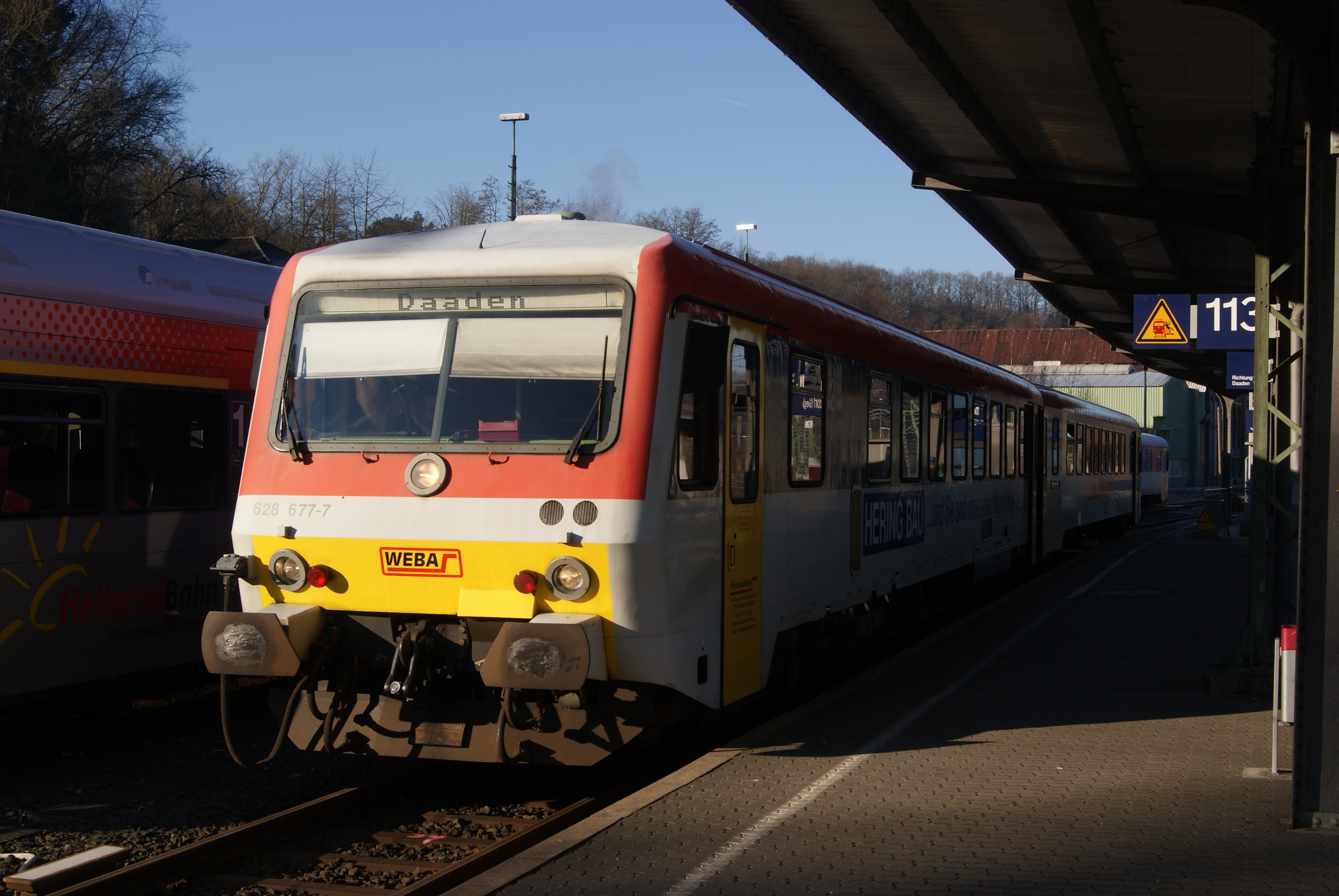
VT 628 of Westerwaldbahn GmbH to Daaden in Betzdorf (Sieg) station

Betzdorf station has a total of six usable tracks, two mostly overgrown tracks as well as two overbuilt tracks. The entrance building is built between tracks 105 and 102.

The numbering begins on the north-east side, at today's car park.

- Track 108 was a through track without a platform. During the construction of the car park it was partly built over and partly abandoned to nature.
- Track 107 was a through track and shared with track 106, an island platform. It was dismantled to give direct pedestrian access from the parking garage to the station. During the implementation of the 2015 Rhineland-Palatinate integrated regular-interval timetable, the track is being reactivated for the timetable change in December 2016, although completion has been delayed.
- Track 106 is located on the platform next to the former track 107. Today it is used by trains of the Rhein-Sieg-Express and the Dreiländerbahn running towards Au (Sieg)/Cologne/Aachen. It was also used by trains of the Rothaar Railway (RB 93) running towards Siegen/Bad Berleburg, which started here until track 107 was completed.
- Track 105 is a through track and is located on the north-east side as the "house" platform (on which the station building is built), the south-western side of which is faced by track 102. Today it is served by the trains of the Rhein-Sieg-Express and the Dreiländerbahn towards Siegen.
- Track 102 is a through track and is located as a second "house" platform on the south-west side of the entrance building. This is served by HLB services towards Herdorf/Neunkirchen/Burbach/Haiger/Dillenburg over the Betzdorf–Haiger railway.
- Track 101 is another through track and is located next to track 113. This track is used as a bypass track for trains of the Betzdorf–Haiger railway and the Betzdorf–Daaden railway. In addition, the trains of the Westerwald-Sieg-Bahn (RB90) to Altenkirchen via Au (Sieg) start here.
- Track 113 is also a through track on the island platform next to track 101. It is only used by the trains of the Daade Valley Railway to Daaden.
- Track 114 is a through track without a platform. Today, however, it is very rarely used for the passage or storage of trains.
- Track 115 has no platform like track 114 and is now largely overgrown with bushes and small trees.
- Track 116 is like the neighbouring track 115 is overgrown and has no platform.

The platforms of Betzdorf station are accessible by passengers via stairways and lifts.

The train station also has a park and ride lot useable for public transport passengers.

== Buildings ==
The locomotive depot and carriage shed of the former railway repair facility, built shortly after 1861, are now heritage-listed.

=== Entrance building ===
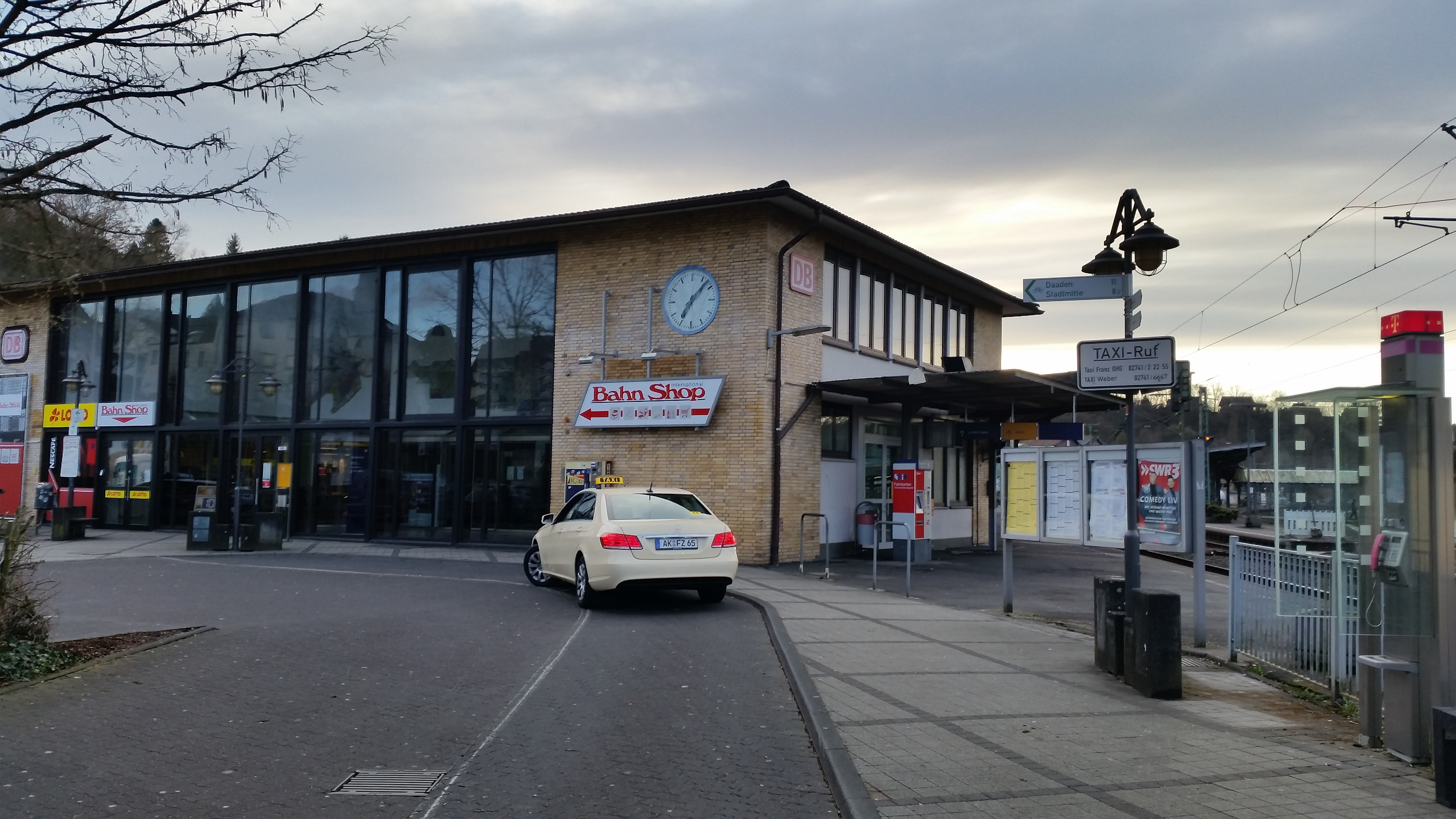
Entrance building of Betzdorf station in March 2016

The station’s address is Bahnhofstraße 1. There is a ticket office and a small shop in the entrance building. In addition, Hellertalbahn GmbH had its headquarters here.

=== Services ===
One Regional-Express and four Regionalbahn services now (2016) stop at Betzdorf station. Long-distance services are not scheduled to the lines through Betzdorf station. Regional freight transport is regularly operated by the Kreisbahn Siegen-Wittgenstein between the Betzdorf–Haiger railway and Scheuerfeld station and the container terminal in Kreuztal. Long-distance freight trains sometimes are diverted from the East Rhine Railway via Betzdorf and Siegen to the Dill Railway, continuing towards south Germany.

Until the closure of the Asdorf Valley Railway (Asdorftalbahn), there were also passenger trains running from here to Freudenberg and Olpe/Dieringhausen.

Line	Service	Route	Interval	Normal platform
RE 9	Rhein-Sieg-Express	Aachen – Düren – Cologne – Siegburg/Bonn – Hennef – Betzdorf (Sieg) – Siegen Hbf; Status: December 2022 timetable	60 min	105 (towards Siegen) 106 (towards Cologne)
RB 90	Westerwald-Sieg-Bahn	Siegen Hbf – Betzdorf (Sieg) – Au (Sieg) – Altenkirchen (Westerw) – Hachenburg – Westerburg – Diez Ost – Limburg (Lahn); Mon-Fri: one train pair from/to Kreuztal; Status: December 2022 timetable	60 min	105 (towards Siegen) 106 (towards Au); 101 (extra peak services)
RB 93	Rothaarbahn	Betzdorf – Siegen Hbf – Kreuztal – Hilchenbach – Erndtebrück – Bad Berleburg; Work days: 2 × from Au (Sieg); Status: December 2022 timetable	60 min	107
RB 96	Betzdorf–Haiger railway	Betzdorf (Sieg) – Herdorf – Neunkirchen (Kr Siegen) – Burbach (Kr Siegen) – Haiger – Dillenburg; Between Neunkirchen and Dillenburg every 120 mins Status: December 2022 timetable	60 min	102
RB 97	Daadetal-Bahn	Betzdorf (Sieg) – Alsdorf (Westerw) – Schutzbach – Niederdreisbach – Biersdorf – Daaden; Status: December 2022 timetable	60 min	113

=== Buses ===
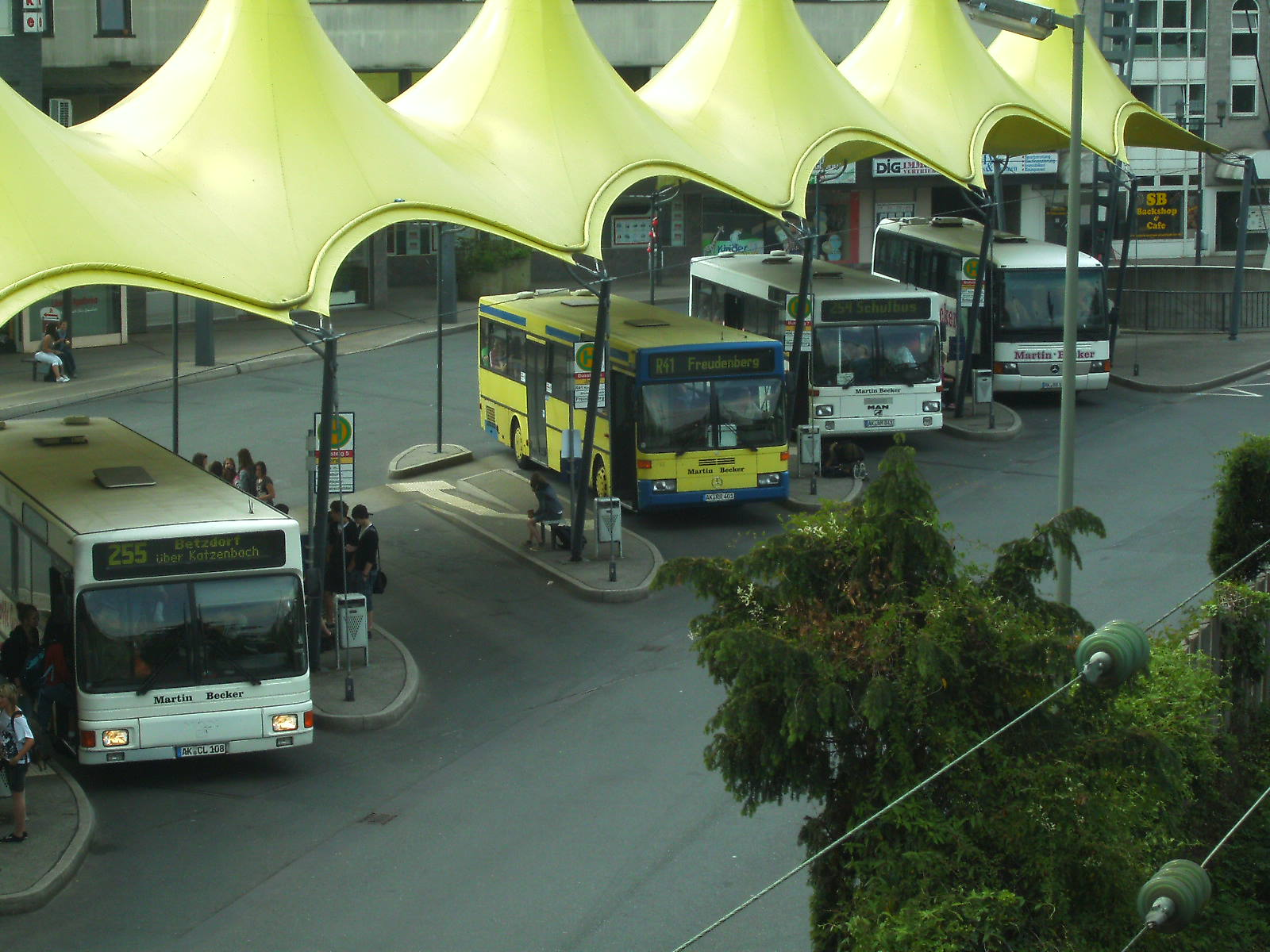
Bus station in Betzdorf

There are various bus routes from the nearby bus station operated by four transport companies connecting neighbouring communities and other districts. Most services serve to carry students to and from school, which is why they usually only run in the morning and the early afternoon (the German school day finishes at about 1.30 pm). Since the state border of North Rhine-Westphalia is not far away, buses connect with some communities and districts there.

== Future ==
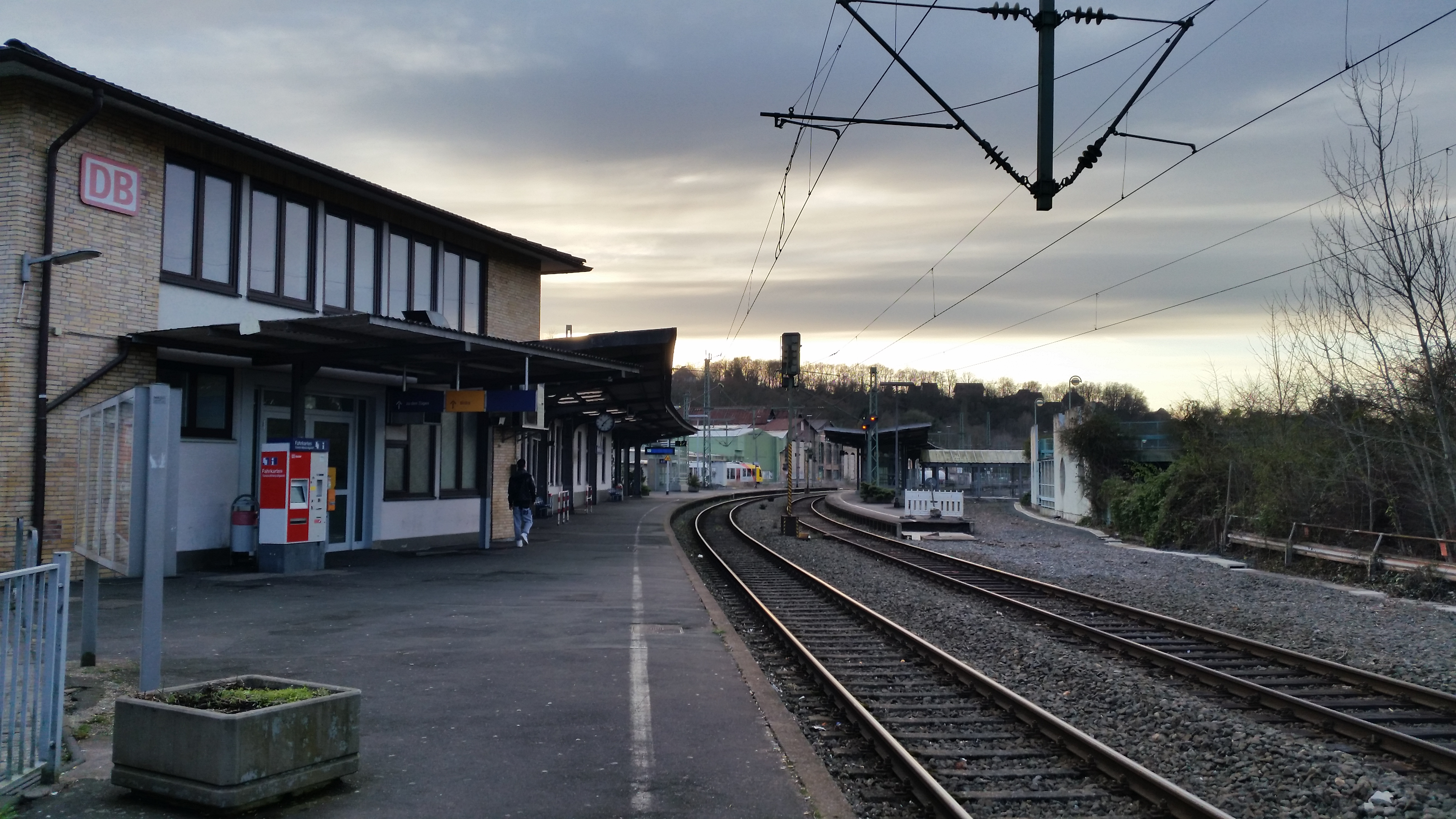
Looking from track 105 towards track 106. On the right it is possible to see the ballast bed of the dismantled track 107 as well as the pedestrian connection to the P&R facility

Since December 2015, the trains of the Westerwald-Sieg-Bahn (RB 90) from Limburg/Altenkirchen via Au (Sieg) have continued via Betzdorf to Siegen/Kreuztal. For the RB 90 service towards Altenkirchen there are additional trains in the peak from Monday to Friday, which start at track 101, for which a new set of points was specially installed to allow trains to reverse on the track and run towards Au (Sieg). Moreover, the journeys on the Rothaar Railway (RB 93) via Kreuztal and Erndtebrück to Bad Berleburg now start in Betzdorf rather than Siegen, where they formerly started. Since 2012, various media have repeatedly reported that there were plans that the previously dismantled track 107 would be restored for route RB 93 towards Erndtebrück; it has been occupied by a pedestrian link between the commuter parking area and the station. Instead of the pedestrian crossing, the already existing pedestrian subway between tracks 106 and 113 is being extended to the parking area. The start of construction of the track was delayed by a year to October 2016 and the rehabilitation of tracks 105 and 106 was interrupted in December 2016 by poor weather. Track 107 is now due to go into operation "in the spring" of 2017. Construction of the subway is "possible at any time" and was due to be "completed in February 2017".

== Fare/transport associations ==
Verkehrsverbund Rhein-Mosel

Due to the location in the Altenkirchen district, Betzdorf station is loctaed in the area of the transport association Verkehrsverbund Rhein-Mosel (VRM), also the Rheinlamd-Tarif applies for rides that start or end in the Rheinland-Tarif area, the Westfalen-Tarif for rides ending or beginning in the Westfalen-Tarif area.
