= Dill Railway =

Railway line in Germany

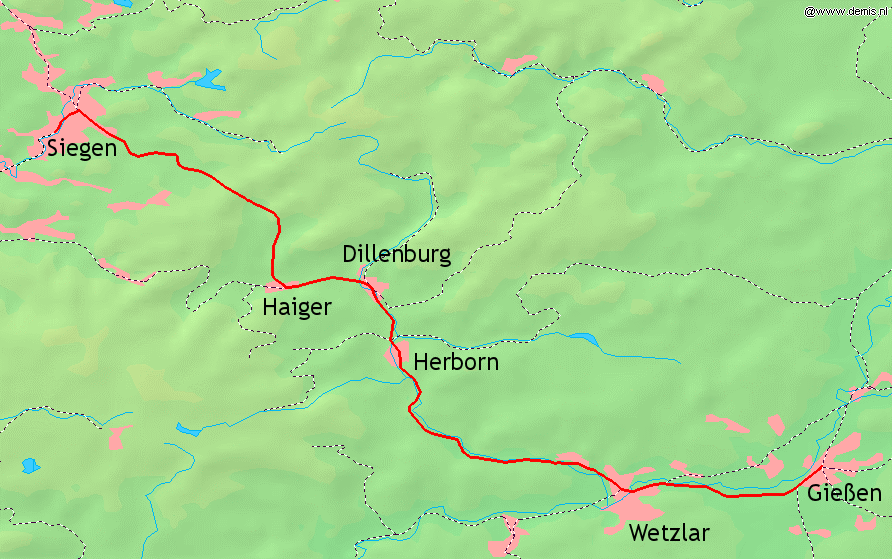

Overview
- Native name: Dillstrecke
- Line number: 2881 (Siegen–Siegen Ost); 800 (Siegen Ost–Haiger); 2651 (Haiger–Gießen)
- Locale: Hesse and North Rhine-Westphalia, Germany
- Termini: Siegen; Gießen

Service
- Route number: 445

Technical
- Line length: 73 km (45 mi)
- Track gauge: 1,435 mm (4 ft 8 1/2 in) standard gauge
- Electrification: 15 kV/16.7 Hz AC overhead catenary
- Operating speed: 140 km/h (87 mph)

The Dill Railway (German: Dillstrecke) is a 73 km-long double-track electrified railway line, which runs from Gießen in Hesse to Siegen in North Rhine-Westphalia. The line is mainly worked by regional trains, including diesel multiples of the DreiLänderBahn, except for the IC 34, which runs between Frankfurt and Siegen, stopping in Dillenburg. The southern section between Haiger and Gießen was built by the Cologne-Minden Railway Company in 1862 as part of its line from Deutz and is one of the oldest railways in Germany. The section from Haiger to Siegen was opened in 1915 by the Prussian state railways.

== History ==
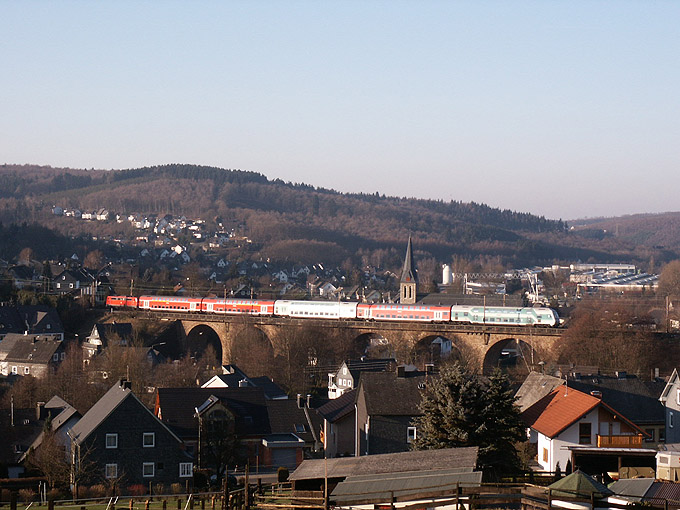
Regional-Express in Rudersdorf

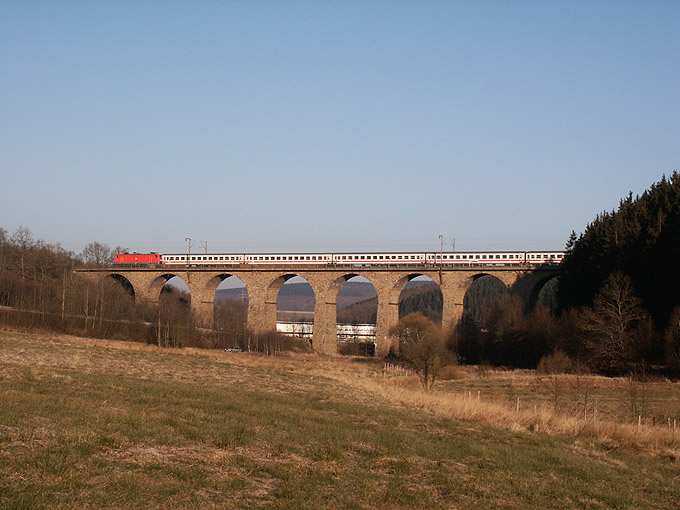
InterRegio service in 2002

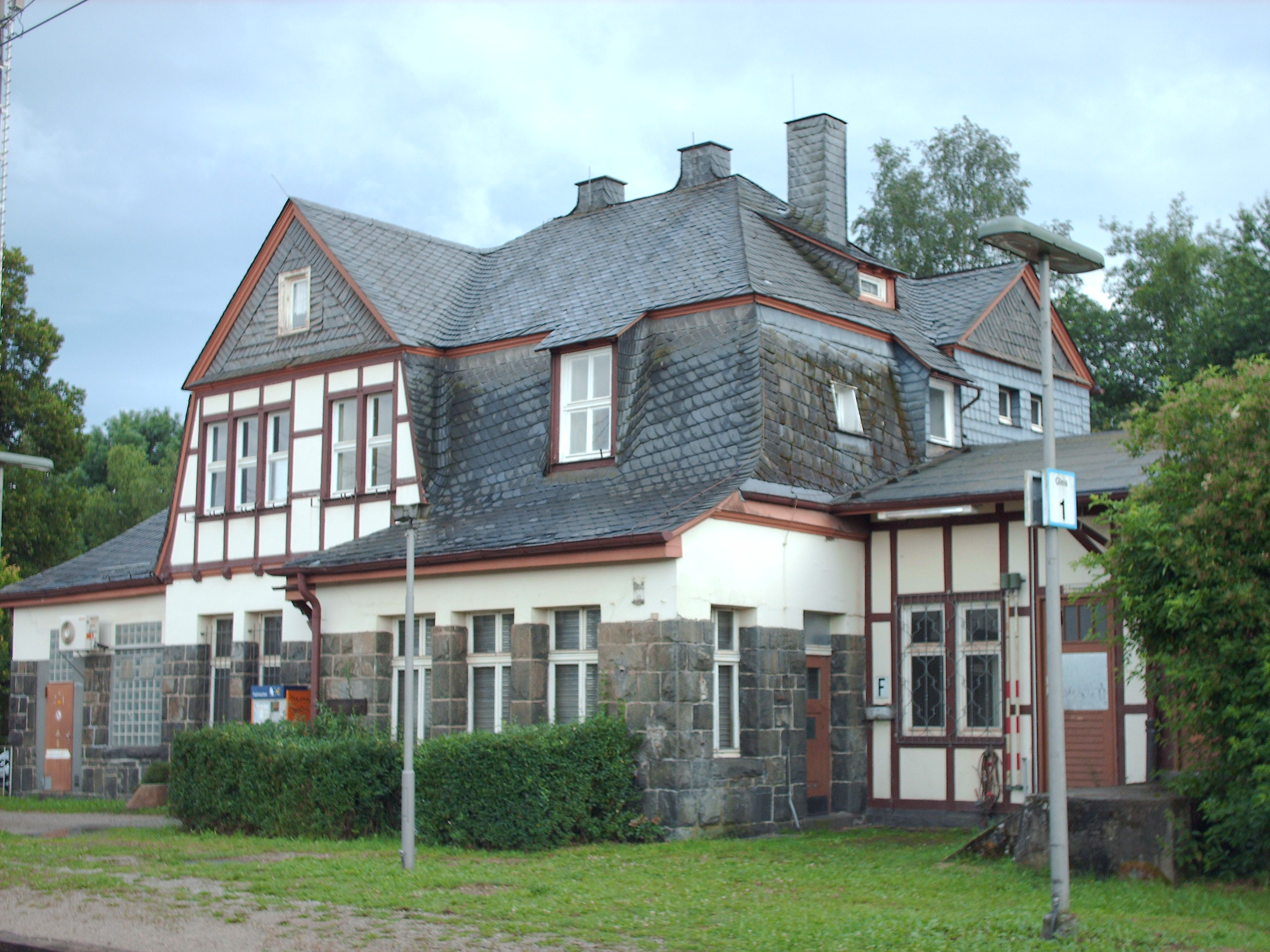
Rudersdorf station

=== Construction ===
The Dill line consists historically in two parts. The southern section was built about 50 years before the northern section.

=== Southern section ===
The southern part is the south-western section of the Deutz–Gießen line built by the Cologne-Minden Railway Company and completed originally as a single-track in January 1862 from Köln-Deutz to Gießen. The population of the rural areas along the Dill river was initially largely hostile to the construction of the railway, although it contributed to the prosperity of the region. It quickly gained great importance for the movement of professionals between home and work. The town of Wetzlar had to accept the remote location of its station, as it was located near a curve in the Dill line built for the junction with the Lahntal railway, which was opened a year later. The route soon became an important line and was almost fully duplicated by1870. The central section of the Deutz–Giessen line ran from Betzdorf via Burbach and Würgendorf to Haiger, the route of the current Heller Valley Railway. Due to the difficult terrain, construction of a direct connection from Siegen to the Dill line was too expensive at the time.

=== Northern section ===
The line between Haiger and Siegen line was opened in 1915, completing a connection from Hagen to Giessen, and thus from the Ruhr to the Rhine-Main area as well as southern Germany. The line was shortened by approximately 30 kilometres. The line was particularly important for coal traffic. This required the construction of the almost 2.7 km-long Rudersdorf Tunnel and two large viaducts, the Rudersdorf Viaduct and the Niederdielfen Viaduct. It was originally planned to build the Siegen–Dillenburg section with four tracks, but this was prevented by the outbreak of the First World War. Because of the engineering works, the entire line between Haiger station and the Hessian / North Rhine Westphalia border, through which the Rudersdorf tunnel passes, has been listed as a cultural monument under the Hessian heritage law.

=== Development ===
In 1965, the whole of the Dill line and the Ruhr-Sieg line were electrified. The first electric train ran on the line on 14 May 1965.

== Operations ==
=== Passengers ===
The train services operating on the Dill Railway were as follows in 2026:

Line	Route	Frequency
IC 34	Frankfurt / Friedberg – Wetzlar – Dillenburg – Siegen – Dortmund (– Hamm – Münster)	5 train pairs
RE 99; Main-Sieg-Express	Siegen – Dillenburg – Wetzlar – Gießen (– Frankfurt)	60 min
RB 40; Mittelhessen-Express	Siegen – Wetzlar – Gießen – Frankfurt	60 min
RB 95	Au – Siegen – Dillenburg	120 min

=== Freight ===
In Germany there are three major freight railways: the North-South railway and the East and the West Rhine Railways. The Dill Railway is very important in handling freight services from the Netherlands and Ruhr to the area around Stuttgart as well as Austria. The most important customer on the Dill Railway is the steelmaking firm of Thyssen-Krupp in Dillenburg, which receives deliveries of goods daily from Thyssen-Krupp in Bochum.
