= Dillenburg station =

Through station in Dillenburg in the German state of Hesse

Dillenburg
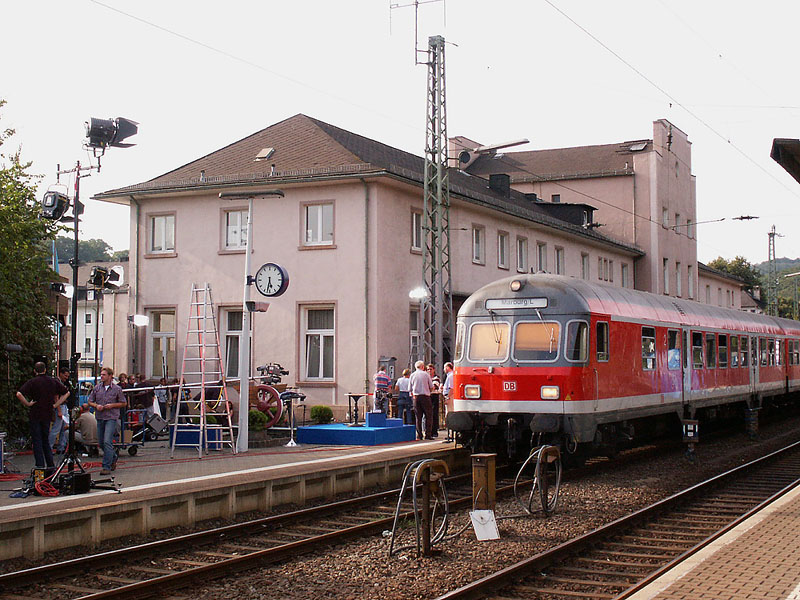
- Reception building with Regionalbahn service to Marburg in 2002

General information
- Location: Bahnhofsplatz 5, Dillenburg, Hesse; Germany
- Coordinates: 50°44′6″N 8°17′40″E
- Lines: Dill Railway (KBS 445); Heller Valley Railway (KBS 462)
- Platforms: 5

Construction
- Accessible: No

Other information
- Station code: 1214
- DS100 code: FDIL
- IBNR: 8000074
- Category: 4
- Fare zone: : 5801; Westfalentarif: 86500 (RMV transitional tariff)
- Website: www.bahnhof.de

Services
Preceding station	DB Fernverkehr	Following station
Siegen towards Münster Hbf or Dortmund Hbf	IC 34	Wetzlar towards Frankfurt (Main) Hbf
Preceding station	Hessische Landesbahn	Following station
Terminus	RB 40	Niederscheld (Dillkr) Süd towards Frankfurt (Main) Hbf
Sechshelden towards Siegen Hbf	RB 95	Terminus
Sechshelden towards Betzdorf (Sieg)	RB 96	Terminus
Haiger towards Siegen Hbf	RE 99	Herborn towards Frankfurt (Main) Hbf
Location
- Location within Hesse Location within Germany Location within Europe

Dillenburg station is a through station in the town of Dillenburg in the German state of Hesse. Immediately adjacent to the station is the central bus station, which is served by many bus lines connecting to the surrounding countryside. Together they form the public transport node of Dillenburg.

== Rail services ==
In the 2026 timetable, the following regional services stop at the station:

Line	Route	Interval
IC 34	(Münster – Hamm –) Dortmund – Siegen – Siegen – Dillenburg – Wetzlar – Bad Nauheim – Frankfurt / Friedberg (Hess)	5 train pairs
RE 99	Siegen – Haiger – Dillenburg – Herborn – Wetzlar – Friedberg – Frankfurt	60 min (Siegen–Giessen); 120 min (Giessen–Frankfurt)
RB 40	Frankfurt – Friedberg – Bad Nauheim – Butzbach – Wetzlar – Herborn (Dillkr) – Dillenburg	40/80 min (Frankf.–Giessen); 60 min (Giessen–Dillenburg)
RB 95	Siegen – Wilnsdorf-Rudersdorf – Haiger – Dillenburg	120 min (weekdays)
RB 96	Betzdorf – Herdorf – Haiger – Dillenburg	120 min (weekdays)

=== Freight ===
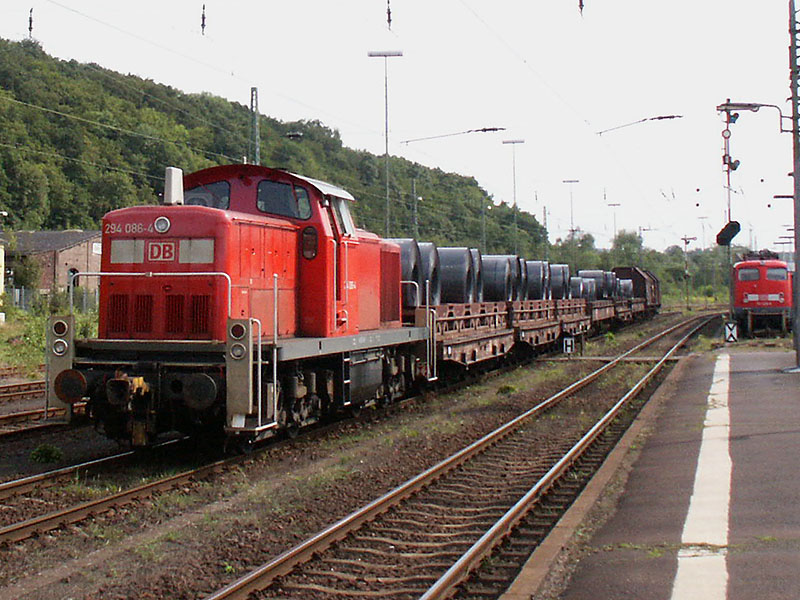
Freight train from Dillenburger freight yard to the steel works

The station is divided into two parts: the passenger station and the adjacent freight yard to its south. Here, regional freight traffic from Haiger and Dillenburg stations is consolidated and linked to the national transport network via the Wetzlar and Kreuztal freight yards. Dillenburg freight yard is also of great importance for the supply of the local ThyssenKrupp Nirosta steel mill with steel coils, delivered every day except Thursday in a single train from the Ruhr area (especially Bochum).

== History ==
Until the cessation of passenger service on the Schelde Valley Railway between Dillenburg and Wallau (Lahn) and the Dietzhölz Valley Railway between Dillenburg and Ewersbach, the station had another platform with tracks 9 and 10, from which trains departed for these two branch lines. Access to this platform is no longer possible.

== Local connections ==
The bus station is next to the railway station, which is served by all local and regional bus lines. There is a taxi stand and short-term parking next to the station. Further south there is long stay parking.
