= Betzdorf–Haiger railway =

Railway line in Germany

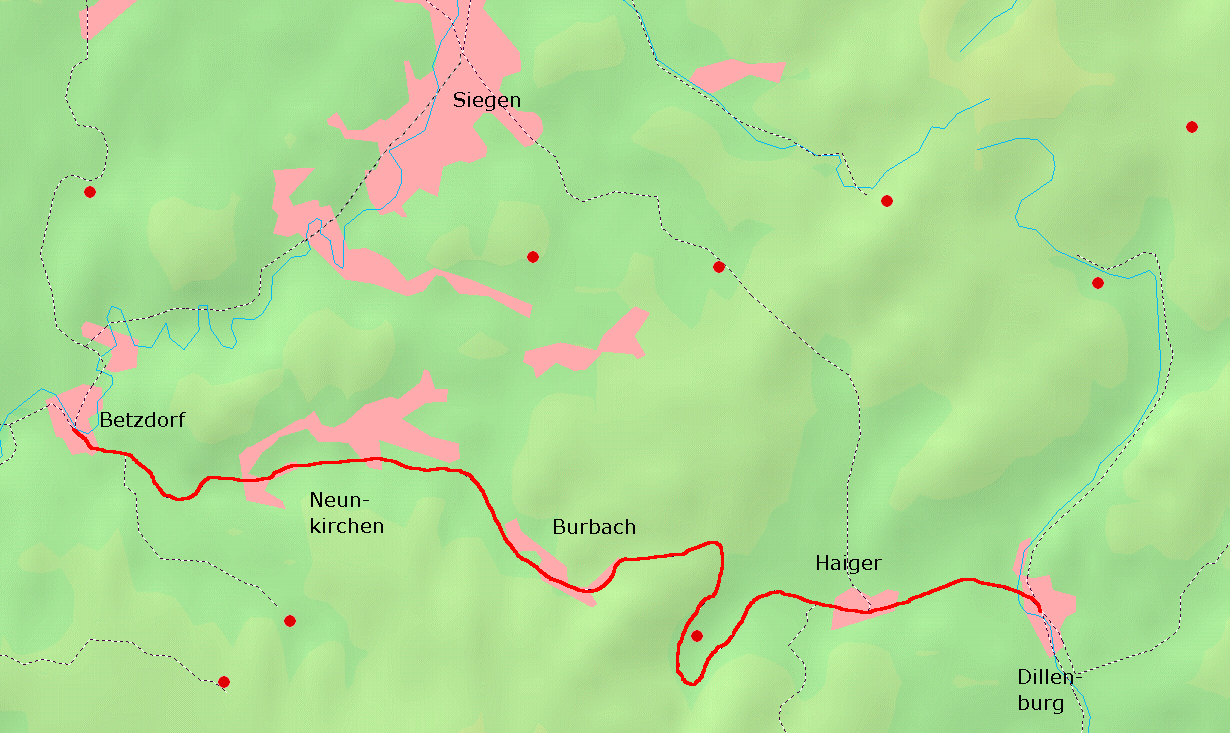

Overview
- Native name: Hellertalbahn
- Line number: 2651
- Locale: Rhineland-Palatinate, North Rhine-Westphalia

Service
- Route number: 462

Technical
- Line length: 36.4 km (22.6 mi)
- Track gauge: 1,435 mm (4 ft 8 1/2 in) standard gauge

The Betzdorf–Haiger railway, also known in German as the Hellertalbahn (Heller Valley Railway), is a 36 kilometre long, single-track main line from Betzdorf to Haiger. The end points of the line are in the German states of Rhineland-Palatinate and Hesse. Between Struthütten and Niederdresselndorf it runs through North Rhine-Westphalia. It was built by the Cologne-Minden Railway Company between 1859 and 1862 as part of its line from Deutz and is one of the oldest railways in Germany. Passenger services are operated by the DreiLänderBahn. Trains run from Betzdorf via Haiger to Dillenburg, partly over a section of the Dill line.

== History ==
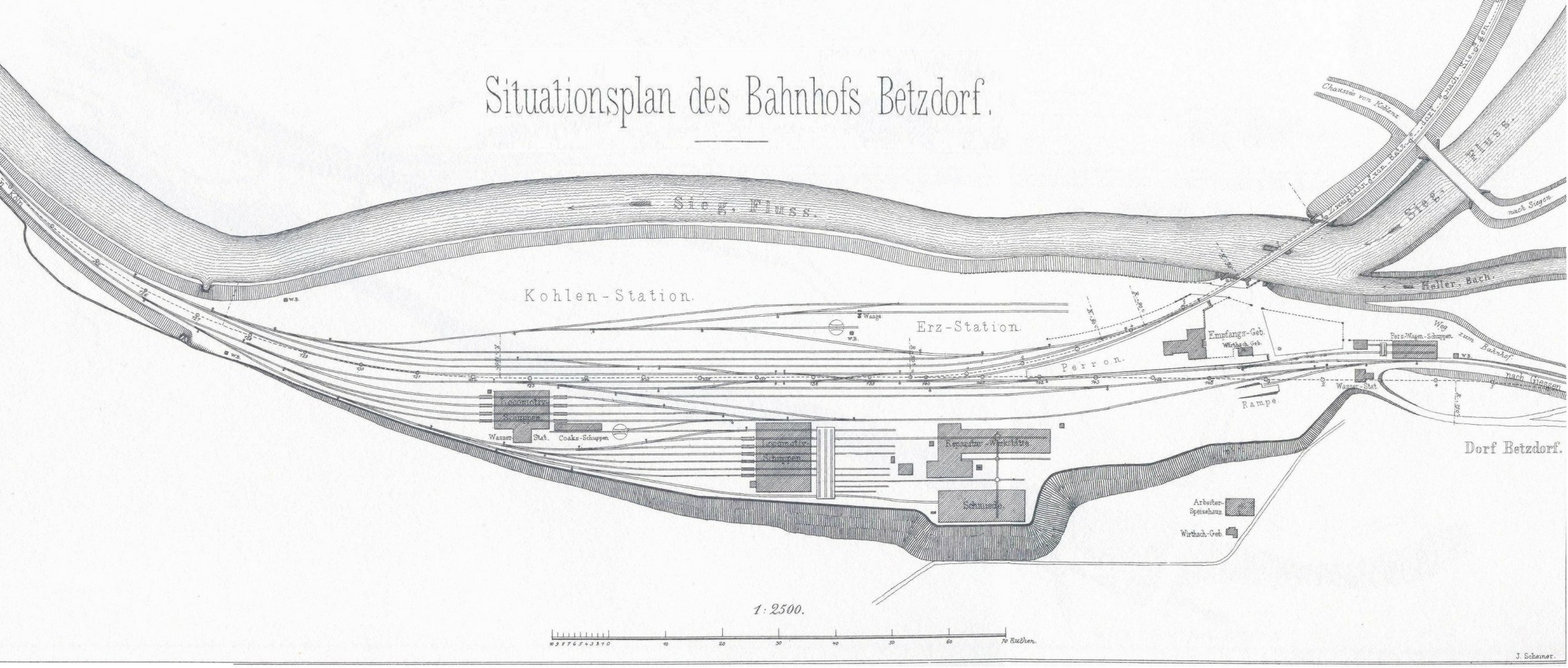
Betzdorf station in 1862

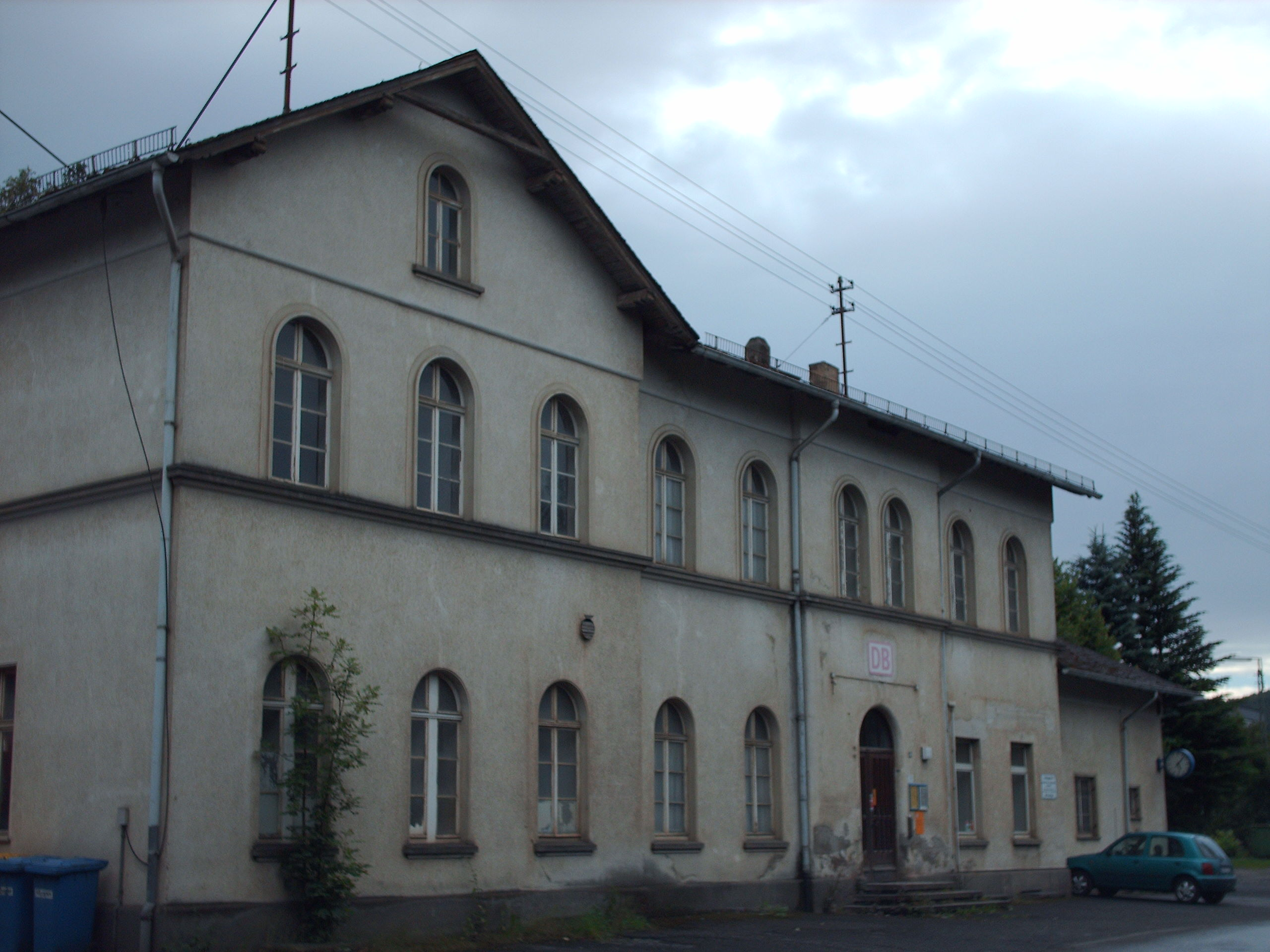
Neunkirchen station

Herdorf station

The Heller Valley Railway was built in several stages between 1859 and 1862 by the Cologne-Minden Railway as part of the Deutz–Gießen railway, the main line connecting Cologne-Deutz and Gießen. Because of increasing traffic and its military significance in the Franco-Prussian War of 1870/71, track on the line was duplicated in 1871.

The decline of the Heller Valley Railway began in 1915 when the extension of the Dill line was opened to Siegen via Rudersdorf. Both the high-quality passenger services and the bulk of freight traffic now used the new route to Gießen and onto the Rhine-Main area. In addition ore mining had begun to decline in the Siegerland. The line was further downgraded with the electrification of the Ruhr-Sieg and Dill lines in the mid-1960s. This was followed in 1965 by the dismantling of the second track between Herdorf and Haiger. Due to the decline in passengers, Deutsche Bundesbahn eventually requested permission to close the line. There were plans for the line to be electrified together with the Sieg line, but they were not followed up.

In 1984, the then Deutsche Bundesbahn administration (Bundesbahndirektion) in Essen considered transferring passenger services, at least on the Neunkirchen–Haiger section, to buses, and, possibly as a second step, permanently closing the Würgendorf–Haiger section. Three years later, the second track on the Betzdorf–Herdorf section was dismantled. Today, the significance of the old Deutz–Gießen route is only marked by the continuous marking of distances in kilometre (chainage) from Cologne-Deutz and Deutsche Bahn's official route number of 2651, which continues to apply to the original route.

Deutsche Bundesbahn and Deutsche Bahn operated Uerdingen railbuses (class VT95) on the line until 1999 with two or four vehicles joined together. Later class 628 diesel multiple units ran on the line.

In 1997 tenders were invited from competent organisations. As the route runs through three states (between Betzdorf and Herdorf it runs through Rhineland-Palatinate, between Neunkirchen and Niederdresselndorf it runs through North Rhine-Westphalia and between Allendorf and Dillenburg it runs through Hesse), a syndicate of transport authorities developed the process. The contract was awarded to a consortium of Westerwaldbahn GmbH, Kreisbahn Siegen-Wittgenstein and Hessische Landesbahn, operating as HellertalBahn, which commenced operations of services in 1999. Track and signals continue to be operated by DB Netze and stations are operated by DB Station&Service.

== Rail services ==
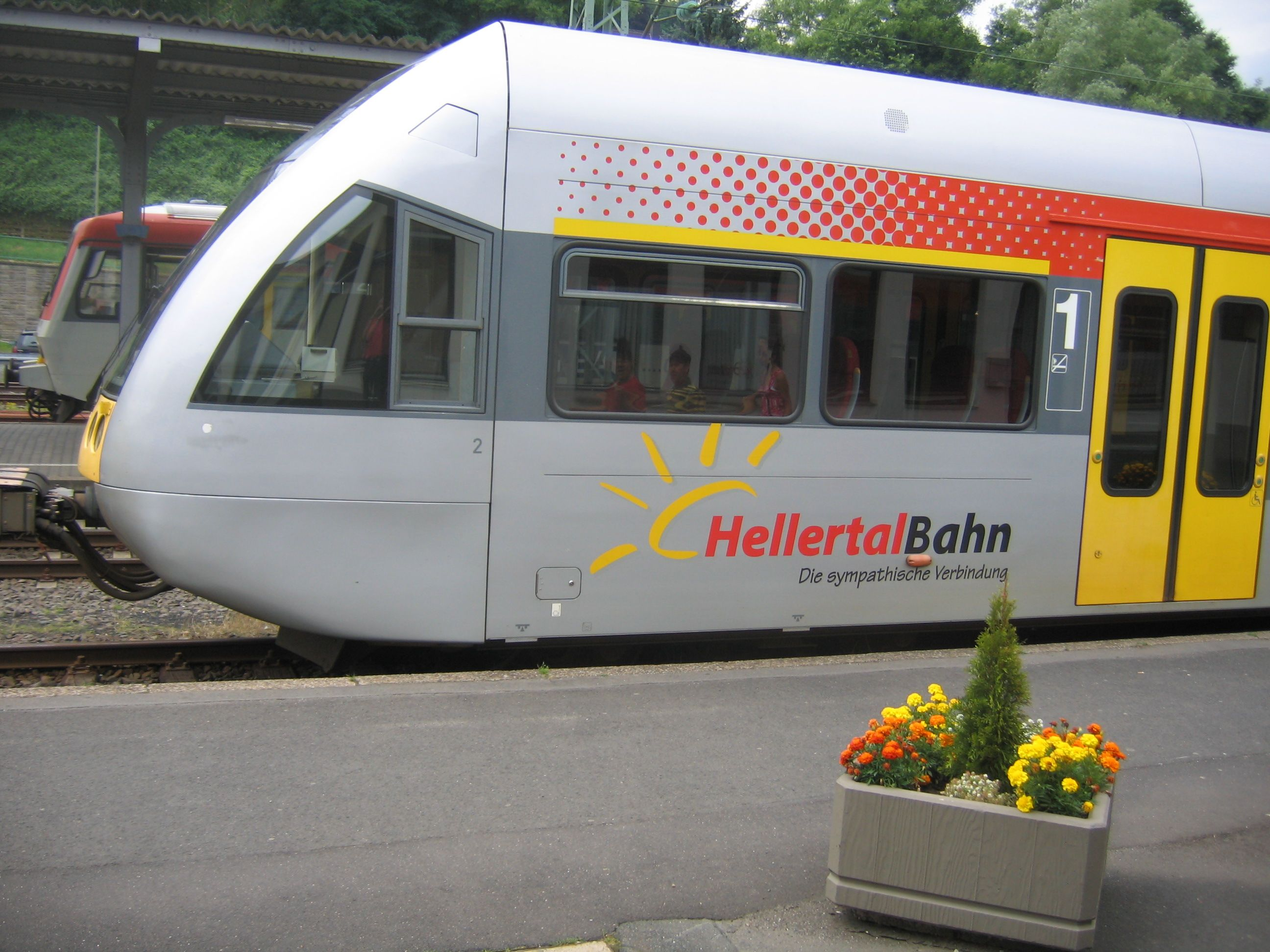
Stadler GTW 2/6 of Hellertalbahn GmbH in Betzdorf; in the background there is a diesel multiple unit of the Daaden Valley Railway

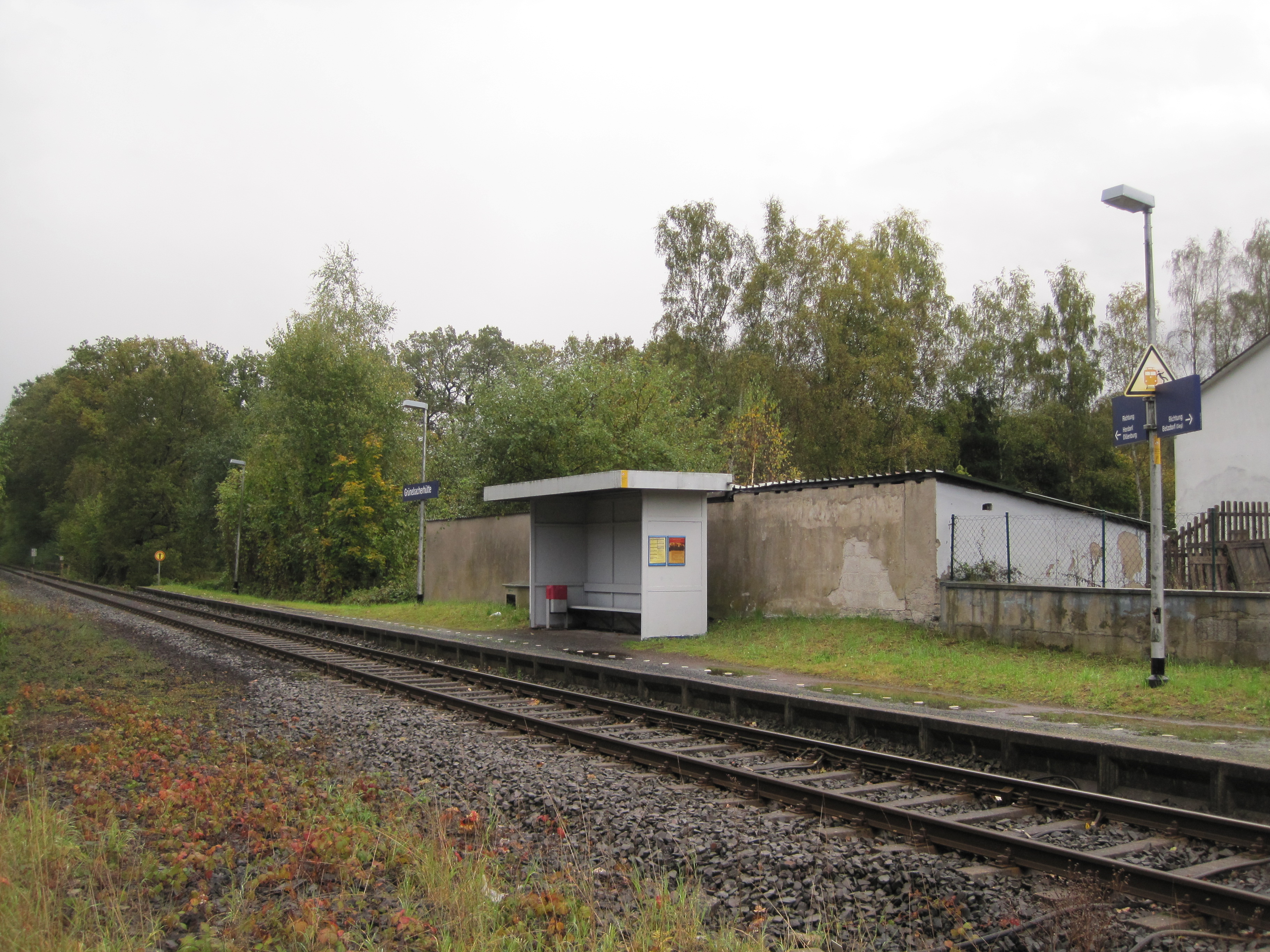
Grünebacherhütte stop in Grünebach along the RB96 line

The DreiLänderBahn operates regional services between Betzdorf and Dillenburg every two hours as much as possible from Monday to Friday. On weekday there are gaps at or after lunch with services ending early in Burbach, Haiger or Würgendorf. At the weekend there is a continuous two-hour service on the whole Betzdorf–Dillenburg line. Between Betzdorf and Neunkirchen, services run every hour (except in the early hours of Sunday and holidays). All trips are operated as Regionalbahn services. The service is designated RB 96. Prior to 13 December 2015, it was designated as RB 41 within the Rhine-Main Transport Association (Rhein-Main-Verkehrsverbund) area.

== Fare/Transport associations ==
The line is located in the area of the transport association Verkehrsverbund Rhein-Mosel (VRM) between Betzdorf and Herdorf, from Struthütten to Niederdresselndorf in the area of the fare association Westfalen-Tarif and from Allendorf (Dillkreis) to Haiger in the area of the transport association Rhein-Main-Verkehrsverbund (RMV).
