= Siegen Hauptbahnhof =

Railway station in Siegen, Germany

Siegen Hbf
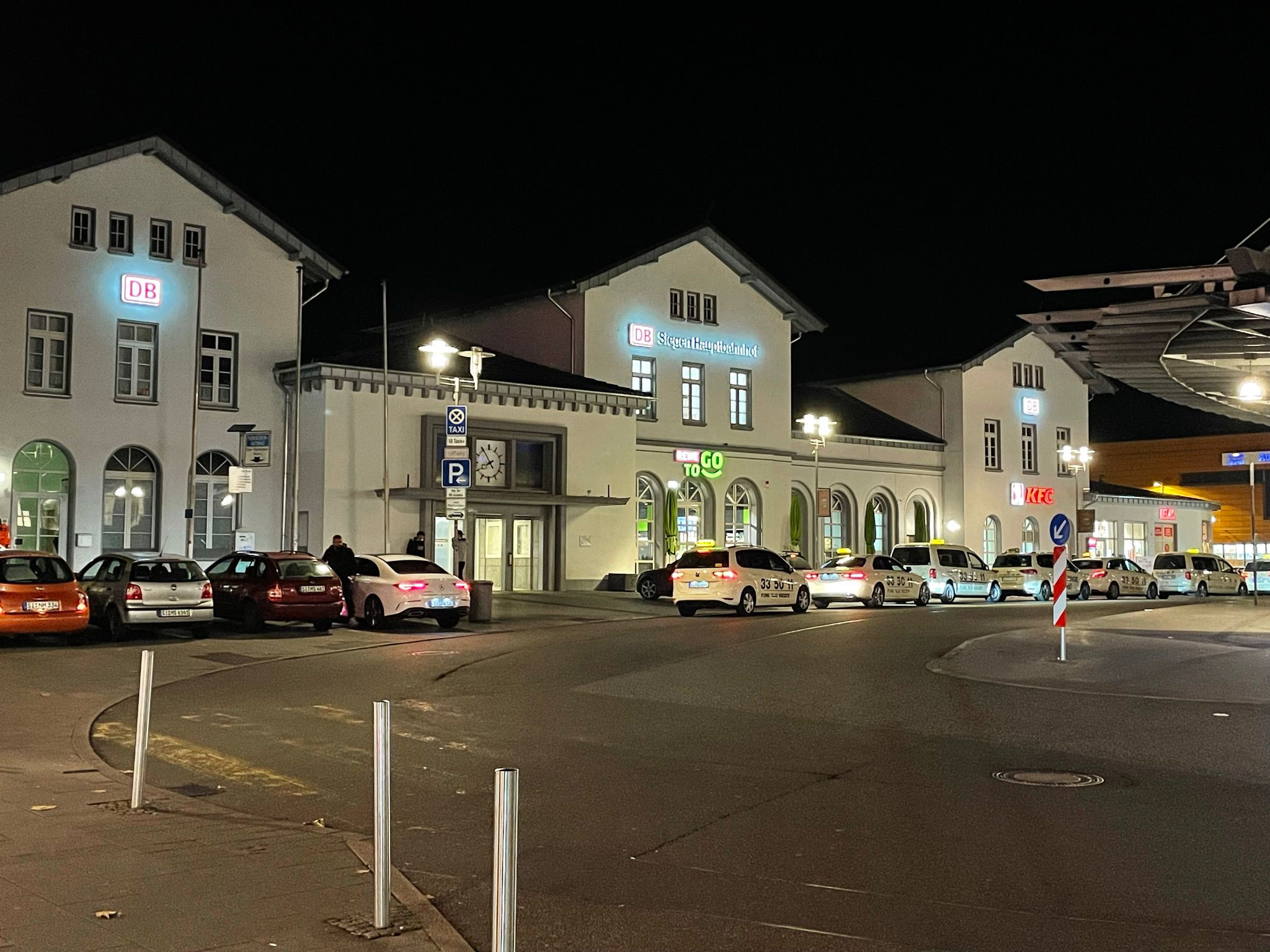
- Entrance building from Sieg Carré

General information
- Location: Am Bahnhof 16-20, Siegen, NRW; Germany
- Coordinates: 50°52′32″N 8°0′58″E
- Lines: Dill Railway; Ruhr-Sieg railway; Sieg Railway
- Platforms: 6

Construction
- Accessible: Yes

Other information
- Station code: 5842
- DS100 code: ESIE
- IBNR: 8000046
- Category: 3
- Fare zone: Westfalentarif: 81542
- Website: www.bahnhof.de

History
- Opened: 1861; 165 years ago
Services
Preceding station	DB Fernverkehr	Following station
Reverses direction	IC 34	Siegen-Weidenau towards Dortmund Hbf or Münster Hbf
Reverses direction	IC 34	Dillenburg towards Frankfurt (Main) Hbf or Friedberg (Hess)
Preceding station	DB Regio NRW	Following station
Niederschelden towards Aachen Hbf	RE 9	Terminus
Siegen-Weidenau towards Dortmund Hbf	RE 34	Terminus
Siegen-Weidenau towards Hagen Hbf	RB 91	Terminus
Preceding station	Hessische Landesbahn	Following station
Haiger towards Frankfurt (Main) Hbf	RE 99	Terminus
Terminus	RB 90	Eiserfeld (Sieg) towards Limburg (Lahn)
Siegen-Weidenau towards Bad Berleburg	RB 93	Eiserfeld (Sieg) towards Betzdorf (Sieg)
Rudersdorf (Siegen) towards Dillenburg	RB 95	Terminus
Location

Siegen Hauptbahnhof is the main station of the town of Siegen, in the German state of North Rhine-Westphalia. It is in close to the modern centre of Siegen, which includes the bus station and the Sieg Carré and City Galerie shopping centres.

== History ==
The station was opened on 10 January 1861 at the same time as the branch line from Siegen to Betzdorf, which is now part of the Sieg Railway. The south-western part of the site, the railway depot in the preserved buildings and the tracks that are numbered from 50 were the terminus of the Cologne-Mindener Eisenbahn-Gesellschaft (CME), which was responsible for the construction of the line, but was taken over by the Prussian state in 1880. The freight yard opposite the depot was built over by the ECE Group with the City-Galerie at the end of the 1990s.

The section from Altena to Siegen of the Ruhr–Sieg railway was opened in the same year, on 6 August 1861, so the Bergisch-Märkische Eisenbahn-Gesellschaft used the north-eastern part of the station with the tracks now numbered from number 1 as its terminus. After being nationalised in 1882, its facilities for the maintenance of rolling stock became a repair shop, which were later demolished and replaced by highway B54, locally called Hüttentalstraße. In this context, no separate track was provided to the former main post office, since letter centre 57 had been relocated to the autobahn.

The founding of the Eisern-Siegener Eisenbahn (now part of the "Siegen-Wittgenstein district railway") and the connection of its central Eintracht station to the Siegen freight yard was a state initiative, which participated from the outset, as a result of which track 52 was used as a transfer track without an overhead line until it was renovated around 2020.

It was not until 1 December 1915 that the Dill Railway was extended, giving a direct rail connection to Haiger (and thus Frankfurt), because its construction had previously been considered too difficult, not militarily urgent and could not be financed. The newly added parts of the triangular junction for this are the two tunnels under Siegener Giersberg with the end points of Siegen-Weidenau and Siegen Ost, of which only the former has two tracks, because the Cologne–Giessen connection via the Betzdorf–Haiger railway had already been built. The connection to the single-track Giersberg tunnel, involved the construction of the railway embankment for the Ruhr–Sieg railway, so that both lines would pass over bridges over both Hagener Straße and Sieghütter Hauptweg, where the level crossing with the Siegener Kreisbahn tramway was already problematic.

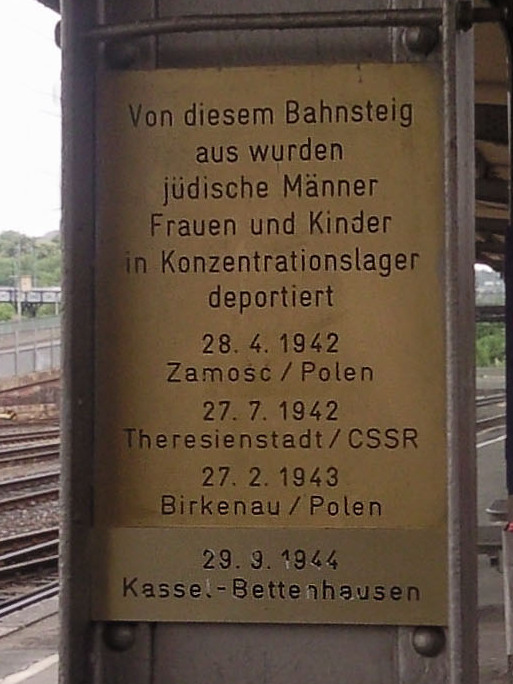
Former commemorative plaque on platform 3 (now renewed)

Between 1942 and 1944, during the Nazi period, people, most of whom were Jewish, were deported from Siegen station to concentration camps. A commemorative plaque on platform 4 is a reminder of this on the initiative of the Aktiven Museums Südwestfalen.

As a railway junction in a centre of iron production, steel production, tool manufacturing and mechanical engineering, the Siegen junction and railway infrastructure was an important strategic target of the Allied bombing raids, especially on 16 December 1944 and until March 1945, during which 90 percent of the city, many tracks, but not the entrance buildings, were destroyed. This became a central argument for their preservation.

With the division of Germany in 1945, only the traffic flows in the north-south direction continued to develop, which led to the Hagen–Giessen axis, including Siegen station, being electrified in 1965, but the Sieg Railway did not follow until 1980 and the Betzdorf–Haiger railway was no longer considered important and in fact one track was dismantled. In 1968 and 1980, respectively, the A45 and the A4 motorways created much faster long-distance connections, and the railways also upgraded their lines in such a way that even before the Cologne–Frankfurt high-speed line was built, a journey from the Ruhr area to Frankfurt via Cologne and Mainz was just as fast as via Weidenau. In order to avoid the time-consuming reversal at Siegen station required for trains between Giessen and the Ruhr, Weidenau became the stop in Siegen for express trains and later InterRegio service 22.

Between the sidings on Heeserstraße and the main post office, a central "Sp Dr S600" signal box was built in the 1980s for the triangular junction and sections of track up to and including Geisweid, Brachbach and Rudersdorf stations.

With the introduction of the integrated clock-face timetable, which provides for the meeting of the Regional-Express trains from the three directions in Siegen on the hour, the single-track Giersberg tunnel has proved to be a bottleneck, because the trains towards Gießen and Frankfurt are often delayed in the double-track area behind the Siegen East freight yard, causing knock-on delays to other trains.

== Services ==
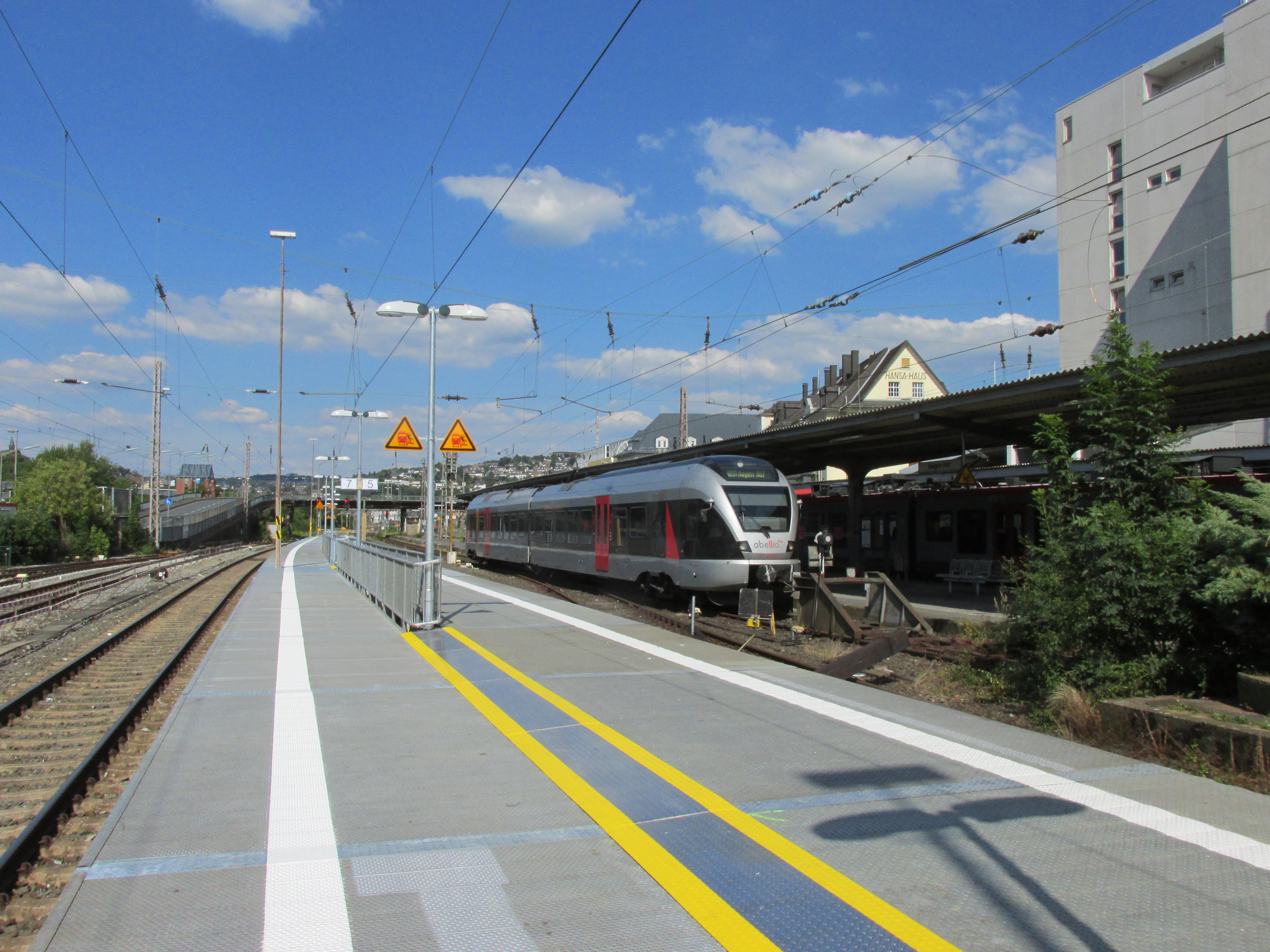
Makeshift platform with tracks 5 and 7 during the platform renovations in 2015.

The station has six platform tracks, of which number 1 (connecting track in the direction of Hagen/Giessen) and 2 are on the main platform. The other four tracks, two of which are dead-end tracks, are on the central platform, two each offset on each side of the platform, so that the two sections of the platform in each direction reflect the original terminal stations: tracks 3 and 4 towards Hagen/Giessen and tracks 54 and 55 towards Cologne. The platform height has been 76 centimetres since 2018. The maximum platform lengths vary between 150 and 353 metres. In 2020, new entry signals among other things were installed. As a result, it is now possible, for example, for the RE9 from Cologne to run to track 54 at 60 km/h instead of 30 km/h and only then reduce speed at the platform. The same applies to trains from the Ruhr area and Münster when entering platform 4.

Since the beginning of June 2015, the station's rail infrastructure has been comprehensively modernised for €11.4 million. The completion of the modernisation measures ("modernisation offensive MOF 2") was expected by the end of 2024. So far, in addition to the renewed platforms, the station has received a new pedestrian overpass and lifts (in operation since the end of February 2019), which enable barrier-free access both to the platforms themselves and to Freudenberger Straße. In addition, the platforms received new roofing and modern lighting and loudspeaker systems. In October 2020, the underpass was usable again after the completion of the modernisation. Work is underway on a new roof for the main platform so that passengers can walk from the station concourse to the platforms with dry feet.

The entrance building from 1861 is also to be modernised after the MOF is completed. The demolition of the old station building and construction of a new building, which was repeatedly planned by an investor, is not being pursued further after public opposition. Deutsche Bahn is now planning to rebuild the building while retaining the old structure. Local interest groups are also demanding that it be heritage listed.

The Siegen station is a transport node and connects with the Siegen bus network.

=== Regional services ===
In the 2026 timetable, the following regional services stop at the station:

Line	Service	Route	Frequency (mins)
RE 9	Rhein-Sieg-Express	Aachen – Düren – Cologne – Siegburg/Bonn – Hennef – Siegen	60
RE 34	Dortmund-Siegerland-Express	Dortmund – Witten – Hagen – Letmathe – Finnentrop – Siegen	60 or 120
RE 99	Main-Sieg-Express	Siegen – Gießen (– Friedberg – Frankfurt (Main))	60 (120)
RB 90	Westerwald-Sieg-Bahn	(Kreuztal –) Siegen – Betzdorf – Au (Sieg) – Altenkirchen – Hachenburg – Nistertal-Bad Marienberg – Westerburg – Diez Ost – Limburg	60 (120)
RB 91	Ruhr-Sieg-Bahn	Hagen – Letmathe – Finnentrop – Siegen	60 (120 on weekends)
RB 93	Rothaarbahn	Betzdorf – Siegen – Kreuztal – Hilchenbach – Erndtebrück – Bad Berleburg	60 (120 min: Betzdorf–Siegen Sundays/public holidays)
RB 95	Sieg-Dill-Bahn	Siegen – Wilnsdorf-Rudersdorf – Haiger – Dillenburg	120 (weekdays)

Siegen Hbf is located in the area of the fare association Westfalen-Tarif

=== Long distance services ===
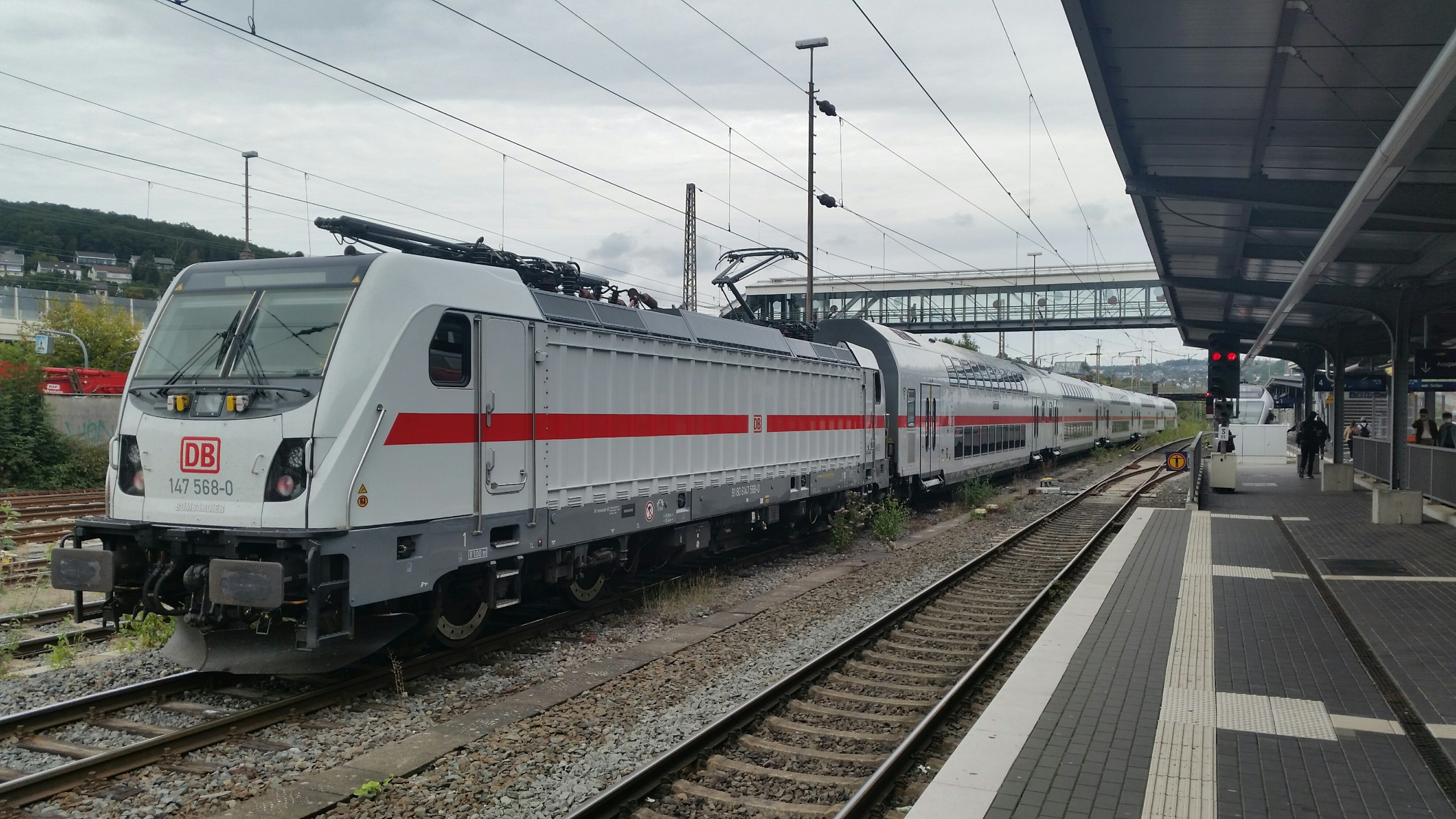
Bombardier Traxx locomotive hauling Intercity 2 coaches for staff training, autumn 2021

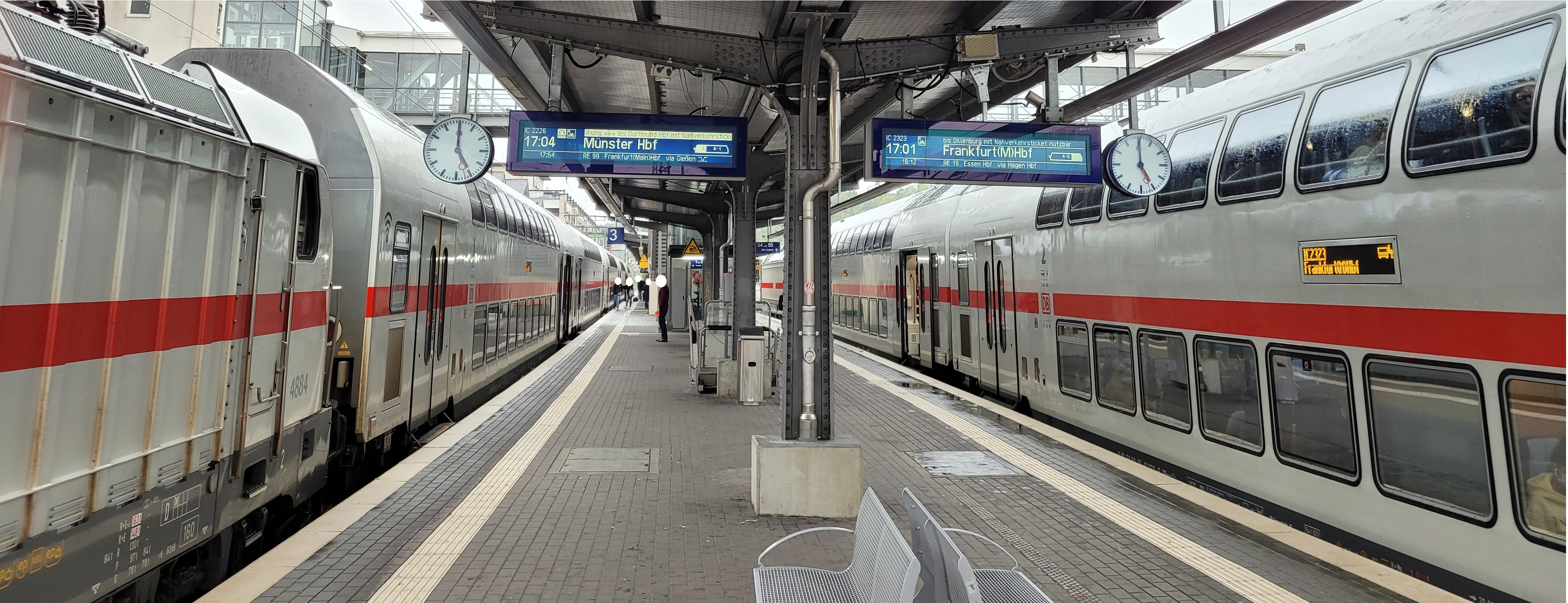
Two Intercity trains meet on the odd hour at platforms 3 and 4, autumn 2022

Since 12 December 2021, IC line 34 has served Siegen with double-decker carriages. As of 2026, it is served by five train pairs between Dortmund or and Frankfurt or Friedberg. These trains can be used with local transport tickets between Dortmund and Dillenburg, operating as the RE 34.

Line	Route	Frequency
IC 34	Münster (Westf) Hbf – Hamm (Westf) Hbf – Dortmund Hbf – Siegen Hbf – Dillenburg – Wetzlar – Bad Nauheim – Frankfurt (Main) Hbf / Friedberg (Hess)	5 train pairs

== Other facilities ==
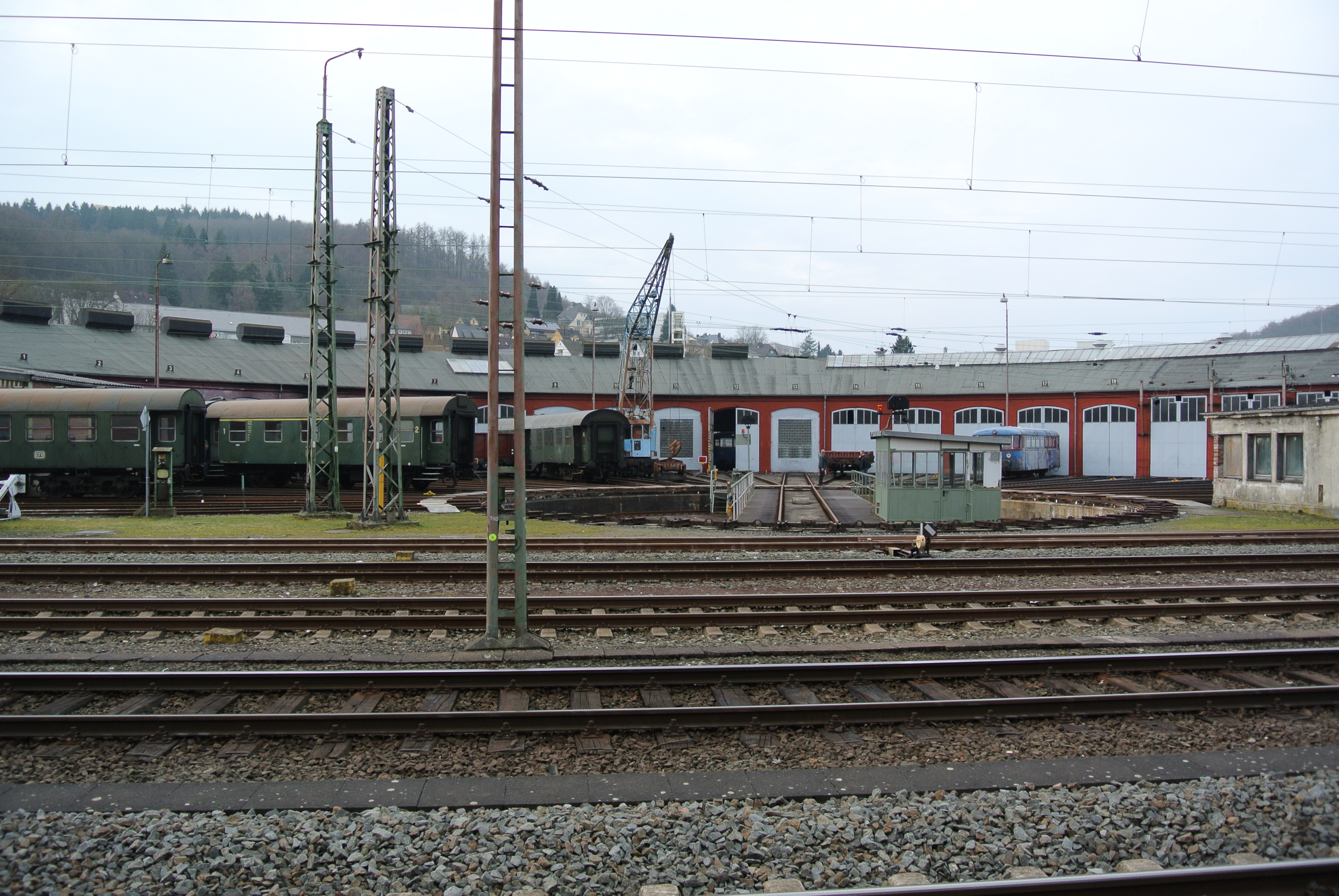
Roundhouse

In the station there is a DB travel centre, a McDonald's, a restaurant and a newsstand.

== Inconsistencies in the naming of the station ==
The Siegen station was not called a Hauptbahnhof (central station) by Deutsche Bahn until 2017. Nevertheless, the term Siegen Hauptbahnhof was used at some signs at the station, on road maps and in on-train announcements. The station was officially renamed to Siegen Hauptbahnhof after the completion of the refurbishment works in December 2017.
