= Johannes Behner =

German politician (born 1989)

Member of the Landtag of Rhineland-Palatinate
- Incumbent
- Assumed office 18 May 2026
- Preceded by: Michael Wäschenbach
- Constituency: Betzdorf/Kirchen (Sieg) (2026–present)

Personal details
- Born: 26 February 1989 (age 37)
- Party: Christian Democratic Union

Johannes Behner (born 26 February 1989) is a German politician serving as a member of the Landtag of Rhineland-Palatinate since 2026. He has served as mayor of Betzdorf since 2024.
