= Attendorn station =

Railway station in Attendorn, Germany

Attendorn
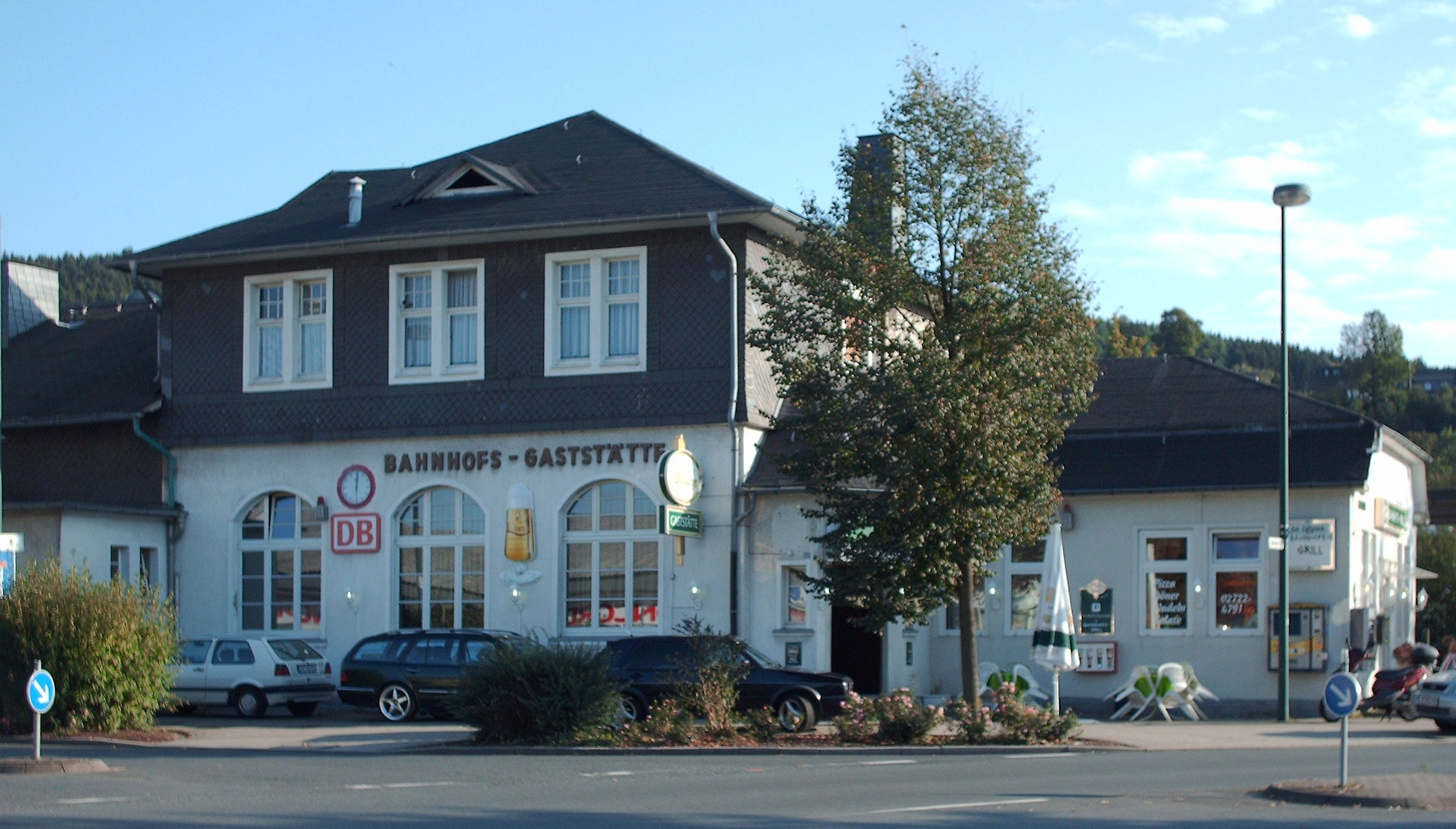
- 2006

General information
- Location: Am Zollstock 17; 57439 Attendorn; North Rhine-Westphalia; Germany
- Coordinates: 51.1249°N 7.9085°E
- System: Bf
- Owner: Deutsche Bahn
- Operator: DB Station&Service
- Lines: Finnentrop–Freudenberg railway (KBS 442)
- Platforms: 2 side platforms
- Tracks: 2
- Train operators: Hessische Landesbahn
- Connections: RB 92; 70 270 R61 R62 R98 A522 L520 L521

Construction
- Parking: yes
- Cycle facilities: no
- Accessible: yes

Other information
- Station code: 202
- DS100 code: EAT
- IBNR: 8000638
- Category: 6
- Fare zone: Westfalentarif: 80206
- Website: www.bahnhof.de

Services
Preceding station	Hessische Landesbahn	Following station
Kraghammer towards Olpe	RB 92	Heggen towards Finnentrop
Location
- Location within North Rhine-Westphalia Location within Germany Location within Europe

Attendorn station (German: Bahnhof Attendorn) is a railway station in the municipality of Attendorn, located in the Olpe district in North Rhine-Westphalia, Germany.
