= DreiLänderBahn =

German railway service

Logo of Dreiländerbahn

Trains of DreiLänderBahn in Westerburg station, types Alstom Coradia LINT, DB Class 628 and Stadler GTW

DreiLänderBahn (literally: Three States Railway) is the name under which HLB Hessenbahn, a subsidiary of the Hessian state railway company, Hessische Landesbahn, operates a group of regional rail services in the German states of Hesse, North Rhine-Westphalia and Rhineland-Palatinate.

== Services ==
Validator in an Alstom Corodia Lint of DreiLänderBahn (because of VRS- and Westfalentarif tickets

Multiple function cart inside an Alstom Corodia Lint vehicle

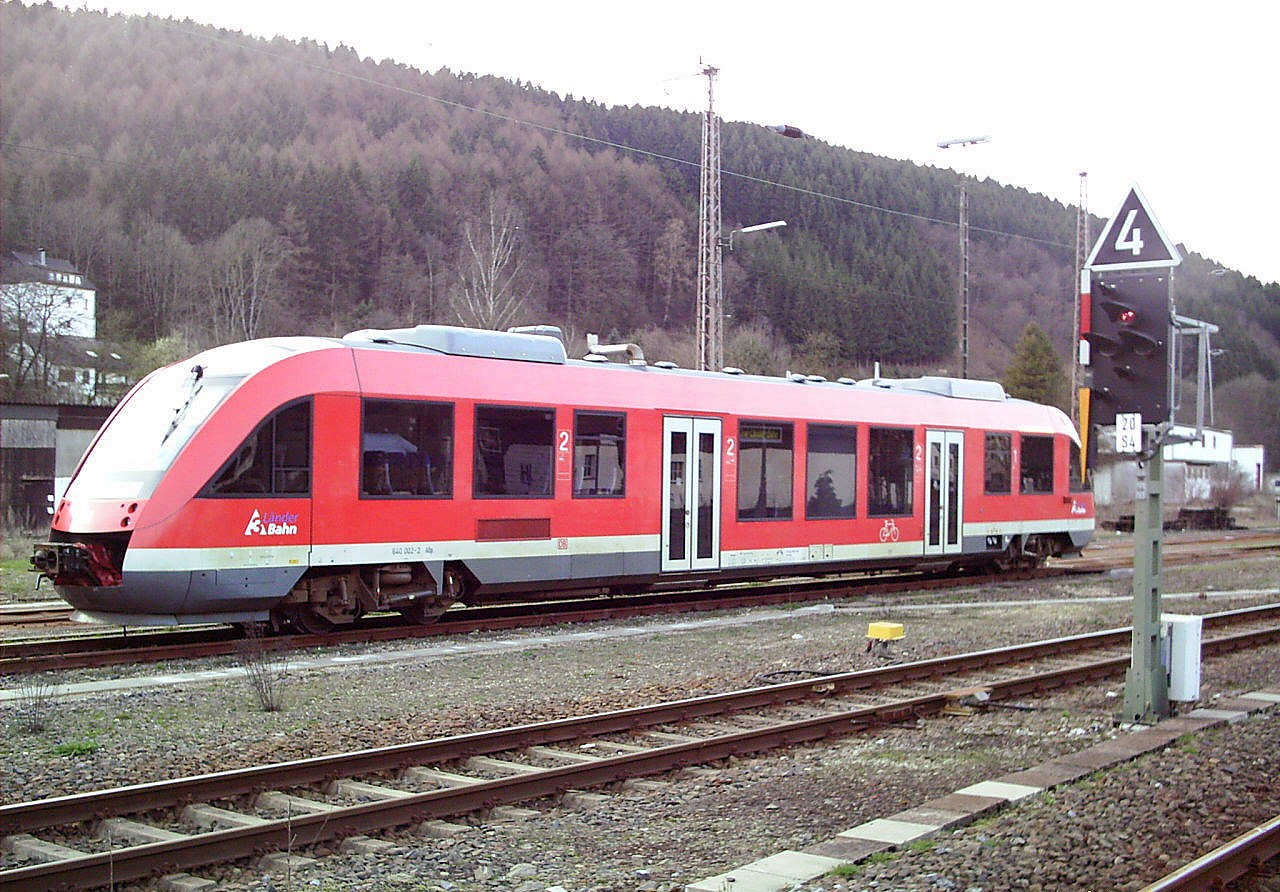
Multiple unit of the Dreiländerbahn at Finnentrop while DreiLänderBahn was still under operation of DB Regio

DreiLänderBahn operates the following services:

Line	Name	Route	Timetable route no(s).	Notes
RB 29	Unterwesterwaldbahn	Siershahn–Montabaur–Staffel–Diez Ost–Limburg (Lahn)	629	
RB 90	Westerwald-Sieg-Bahn	Siegen Hbf–Kirchen–Wissen–Au (Sieg)–Altenkirchen (Westerw)–Hachenburg–Nistertal-Bad Marienberg–Westerburg–Staffel–Diez Ost–Limburg (Lahn)	461	Monday–Friday: 1 service from/to Kreuztal.; additional peak service between Betzdorf and Altenkirchen.
RB 92	Biggesee-Express	Finnentrop–Attendorn–Olpe	442	
RB 93	Rothaarbahn	Betzdorf (Sieg)–Siegen Hbf–Kreuztal–Bad Berleburg	460, 443	Monday–Saturday 2 × from Au (Sieg)
RB 95	Sieg-Dill-Bahn	Siegen Hbf–Haiger–Dillenburg	445	
RB 96	Hellertalbahn	Betzdorf–Herdorf–Neunkirchen (Kr Siegen)–Haiger–Dillenburg	462	

== Stock ==
Stadler GTW of HLB, DreiLänderBahn, primarely in use on RB29

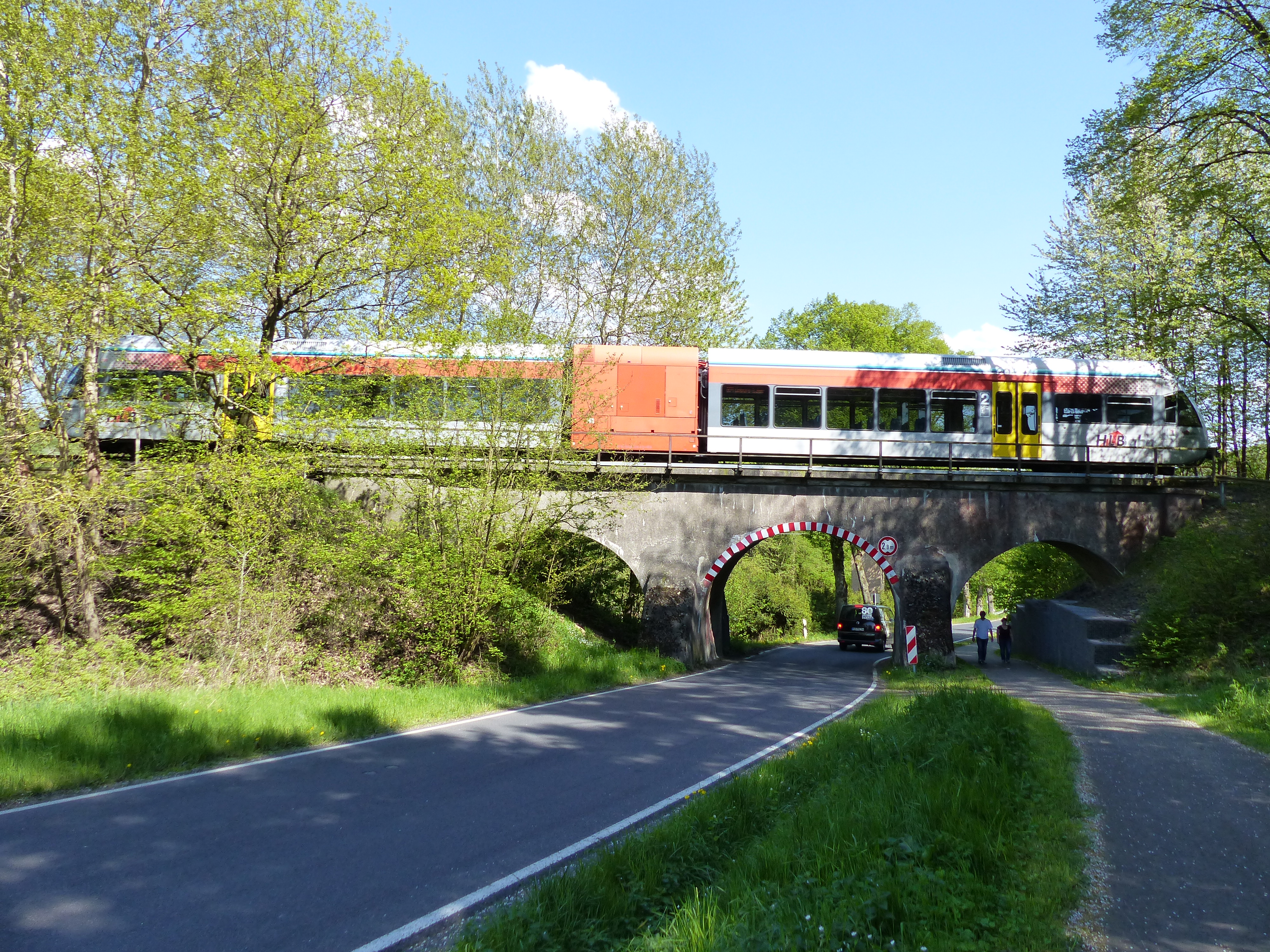
GTW on RB29 near Obererbach

The DreiLänderBahn predominantly operates on non-electrified branch lines. As a result, it uses modern diesel multiple units exclusively. Its vehicle fleet includes Alstom LHB Coradia LINT units of DB Classes 640 (LINT 27) and 648 (LINT 41), which offer comfortable seats with armrests and tables in the 1st class accommodation, a video surveillance system and two multi-purpose compartments (e.g. for bicycles or prams). Large windows provide the interior very light. By contrast, legroom is less than in the older, more traditional Silberling coaches. The DreiLänderBahn also offers a taxi service for connexion to the station. The DreiLänderBahn's multiples are filled at Finnentrop, Dillenburg and Siegen, where they are also cleaned externally. The vehicles have a separated area for the first and second class as well as a multifunctional area for bicycles and not motorized vehicles like scooters, luggage, strollers and wheelchairs as well as electronic screens, barrier free restroom, a ticket mashine and two validators for tickets of Rheinlandtarif and Westfalentarif.

== Fares ==
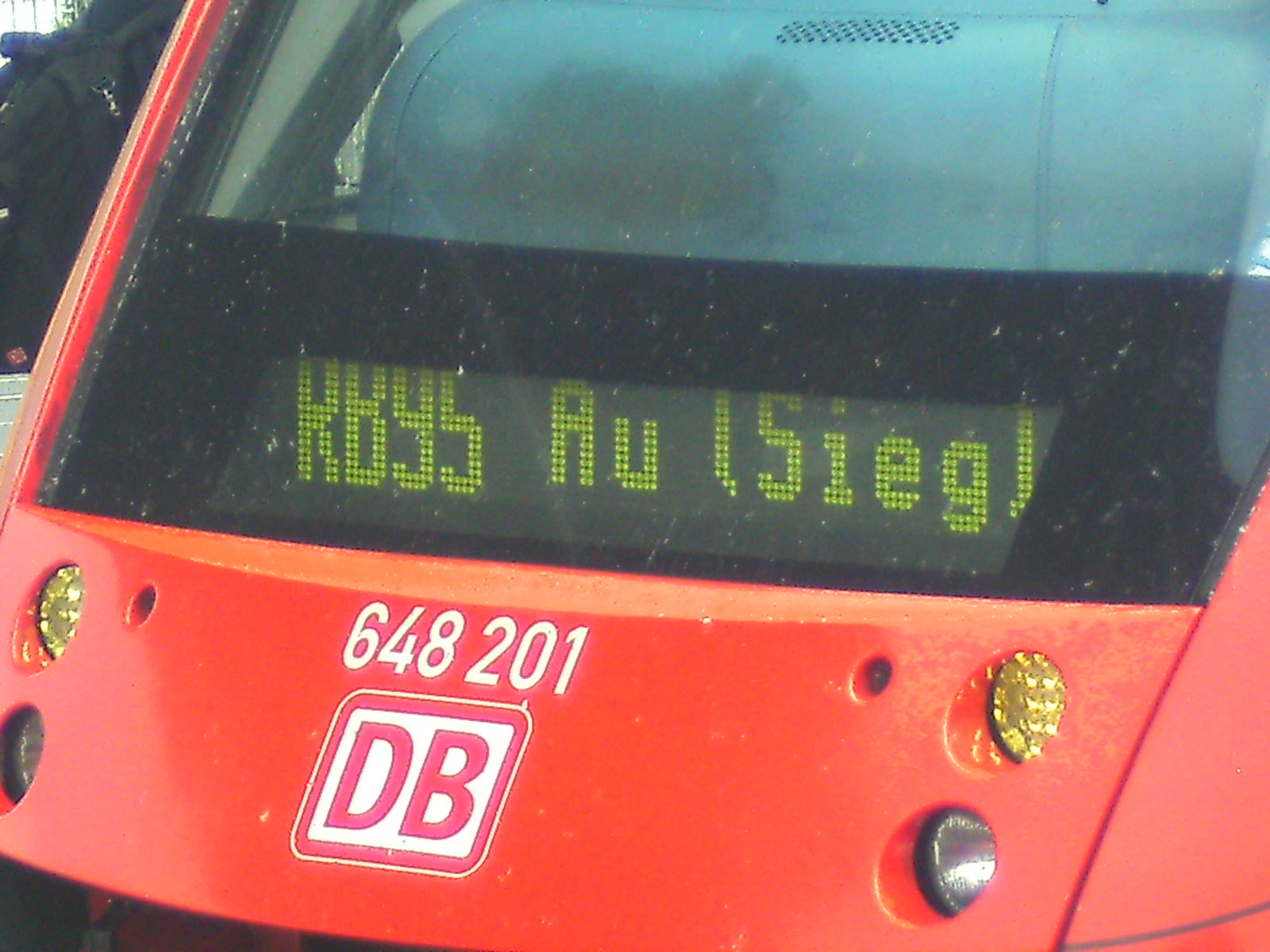
While DreiLänderBahn was operated by DB Regio and the RB90 had not been established, the service from Limburg via Westerburg to Au (Sieg) (then called the RB28) was operated by Vectus Verkehrsgesellschaft and RB95 ended at Au (Sieg) station (picture)

The lines of the DreiLänderBahn are located in the area of the fare/transport associations Rhein-Main-Verkehrsverbund (RMV), Verkehrsverbund Rhein-Mosel (VRM), Westfalen-Tarif and Rheinland-Tarif (former Verkehrsverbund Rhein-Sieg (VRS)) fare.

== See also ==
- Lahn-Eifel-Bahn
- Rhein-Sieg-Express
