= Main-Sieg-Express =

Train service in Germany

RE 98/99: Main-Sieg-Express
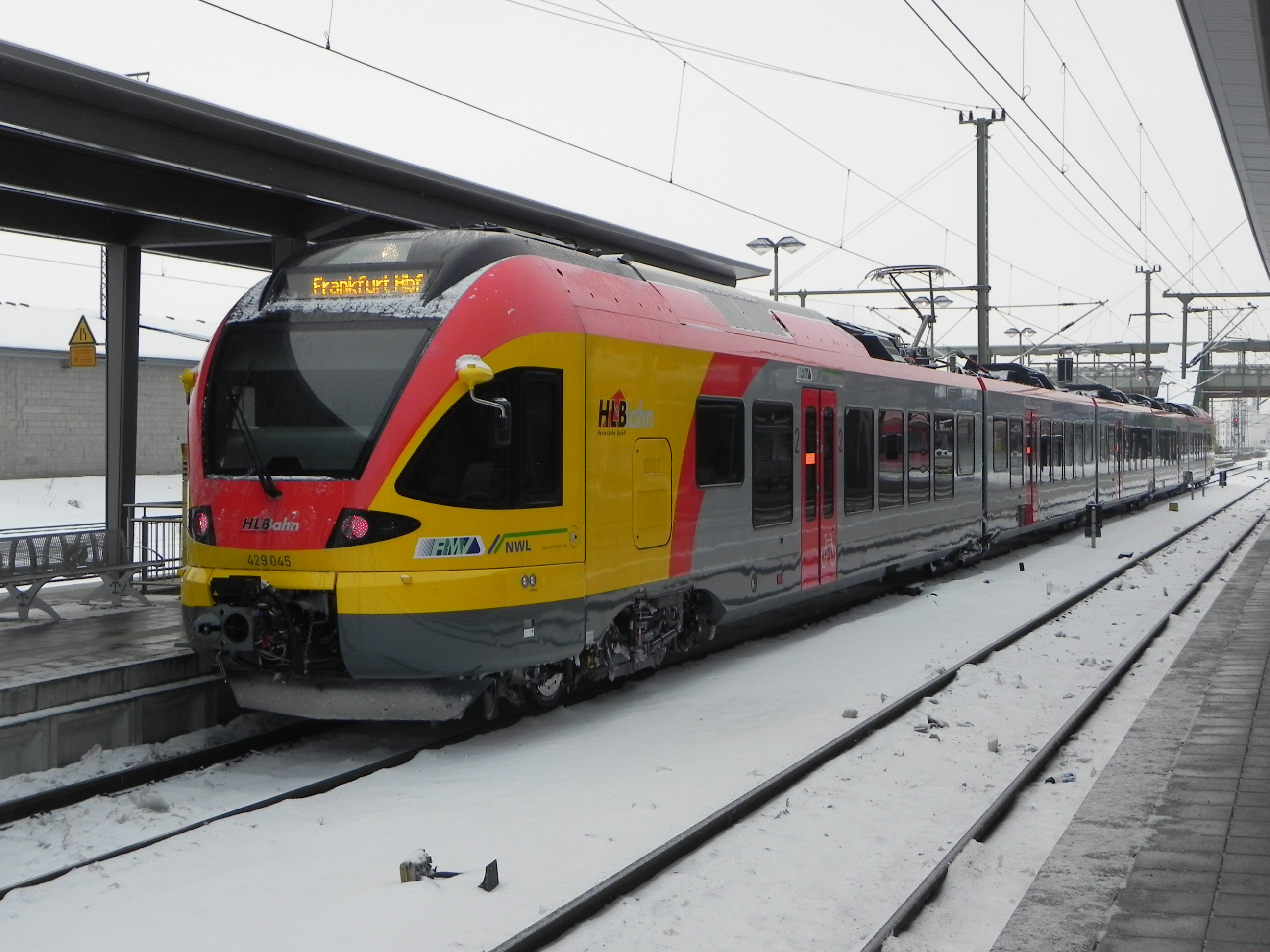
- FLIRT EMU of the HLB

Overview
- Locale: North Rhine-Westphalia, Hesse, Germany

Service
- Route number: 445, 630 and 620
- Operator(s): Hessische Landesbahn

Technical
- Line length: 139 km (86 mi)
- Operating speed: 160 km/h (99 mph) (maximum)
Route map
- Source: German railway atlas

The Main-Sieg-Express is a Regional-Express service operated by the German states of North Rhine-Westphalia (NRW) and Hesse from Siegen via Gießen to Frankfurt. It is operated by the Hessische Landesbahn (Hessian State Railway, HLB).

== History ==
On 25 June 2008, the Rhein-Main-Verkehrsverbund (Rhine-Main Transport Association, RMV) and the Zweckverband Nahverkehr Westfalen-Lippe (Local transport association of Westphalia-Lippe, NWL) announced in a joint press statement that Hessische Landesbahn has won a Europe-wide tender and would take over the operation of the service for 13 years with effect on 12 December 2010. Until the commencement of the 2010/2011 timetable in December 2010, DB Regio Hesse had been operator of this service, which, after the elimination of long distance services between Siegen-Weidenau and Frankfurt in 2001, had originally been established as an Interregio-Express. In the early years, however, the Regional-Express service was characterised by a much longer journey time than the Interregio service due to capacity problems on the Main-Weser Railway. Travel times with a change in Gießen were up to 20 minutes faster than direct Main-Sieg-Express services. A change in the timings of Intercity service IC 26 between Frankfurt and Giessen in December 2009 allowed the Main-Sieg-Express to run with shorter travel times, almost as fast as the InterRegio timings.

Before the change of operators in 2010, the service was operated by DB Regio NRW every two hours via Giessen to Cologne.

== Route ==
The Regional-Express operates from Siegen to Giessen as RE 99 on the Dill line stopping in Haiger, Dillenburg, Herborn and Wetzlar. In Giessen, from Monday to Friday, it is coupled together with a set from Marburg, which is designated as RE 98, and reverses to run on the Main-Weser Railway to Frankfurt with a stop at Friedberg.

== Rolling stock ==
The service is operated with Stadler FLIRT electric multiple units. Five carriage sets are operated between Siegen and Frankfurt, while the Marburg–Giessen set is operated with three carriage sets. Before December 2010, the Siegen-Frankfurt line had been operated for many years with class 111 locomotives hauling five or six double deck carriages, or alternatively, with class 110 locomotives hauling six Silberling carriages.

== Operations ==
Services run every day at least once every two hours over the whole route. Train runs hourly on the Siegen-Gießen section, but there are periods on weekends when services do not run every hour. A section of the train is detached/attached to run between Marburg and Kassel. On the route to and from Kassel, the train stops at all stations between Kirchhain and Baunatal-Guntershausen. Since December 2018, Kassel-Oberzwehren and Baunatal-Rengershausen stations have only been served at certain times (usually at off-peak times).

In addition, a fast connection is provided for commuters in the peaks on the Dill line to Frankfurt. A service called RE-Sprinter is operated from Monday to Friday during the peaks in each direction, which runs on the Dutenhofen–Gießen-Bergwald route, which is otherwise used only by freight trains. This eliminates the time-consuming change of direction in Gießen. A significant reduction in travel time is currently achieved only on the evening train to Siegen. The morning train to Frankfurt uses the time saved to make additional intermediate stops in Frankfurt. The RE-Sprinters are the only passenger trains on the Main-Weser Railway that are not scheduled to stop in Friedberg.

== See also ==
- List of rail services of the Rhein-Main-Verkehrsverbund
- List of regional rail lines in North Rhine-Westphalia
