= Betzdorf, Germany =

Betzdorf
- Town
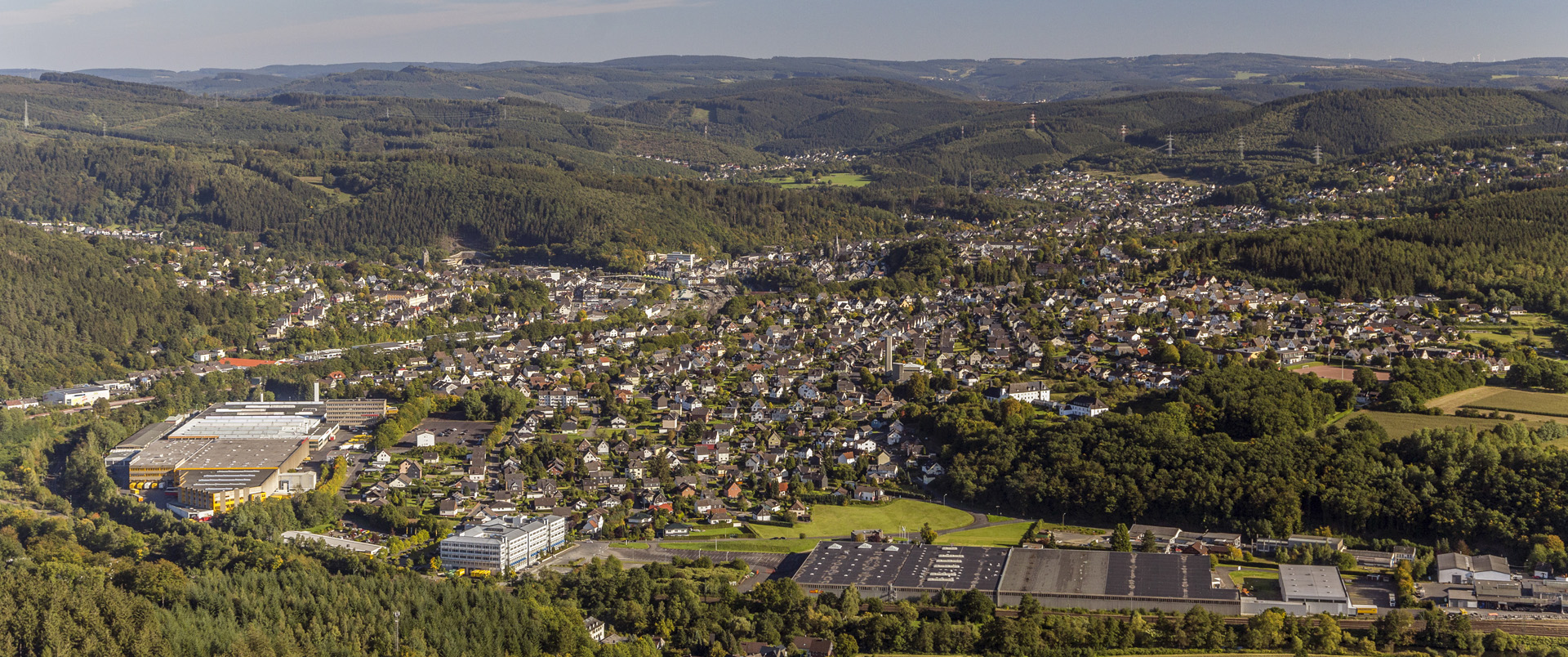
- aerial view

- Coat of arms

- Location of Betzdorf within Altenkirchen (Westerwald) district
- Interactive map of Betzdorf
- Location within Germany Location within Rhineland-Palatinate
- Coordinates: 50°47′08″N 7°52′22″E
- Country: Germany
- State: Rhineland-Palatinate
- District: Altenkirchen (Westerwald)
- Municipal assoc.: Betzdorf-Gebhardshain

Government
  - Mayor (2024–29): Johannes Behner (CDU)

Area
  - Total: 9.56 km^{2} (3.69 sq mi)
- Elevation: 211 m (692 ft)

Population (2025-12-31)
  - Total: 10,367
  - Density: 1,080/km^{2} (2,810/sq mi)
- Time zone: UTC+01:00 (CET)
  - Summer (DST): UTC+02:00 (CEST)
- Postal codes: 57501–57518
- Dialling codes: 02741
- Vehicle registration: AK
- Website: www.vg-bg.de/betzdorf/

Betzdorf (German pronunciation: [ˈbɛtsdɔʁf]) is a town and municipality in northern Rhineland-Palatinate, Germany. Betzdorf is part of the district of Altenkirchen. Betzdorf is located on the river Sieg, approx. 15 km (9.3 mi) south-west of Siegen. Betzdorf is the seat of the Verbandsgemeinde Betzdorf-Gebhardshain. Betzdorf (Sieg) station is a railway junction with closed marshalling yard on the Sieg Railway, the Betzdorf–Haiger railway and the Betzdorf–Daaden railway.

It is twinned (sister city) with the towns of Ross-on-Wye, England and Decize, France.

== Transport ==
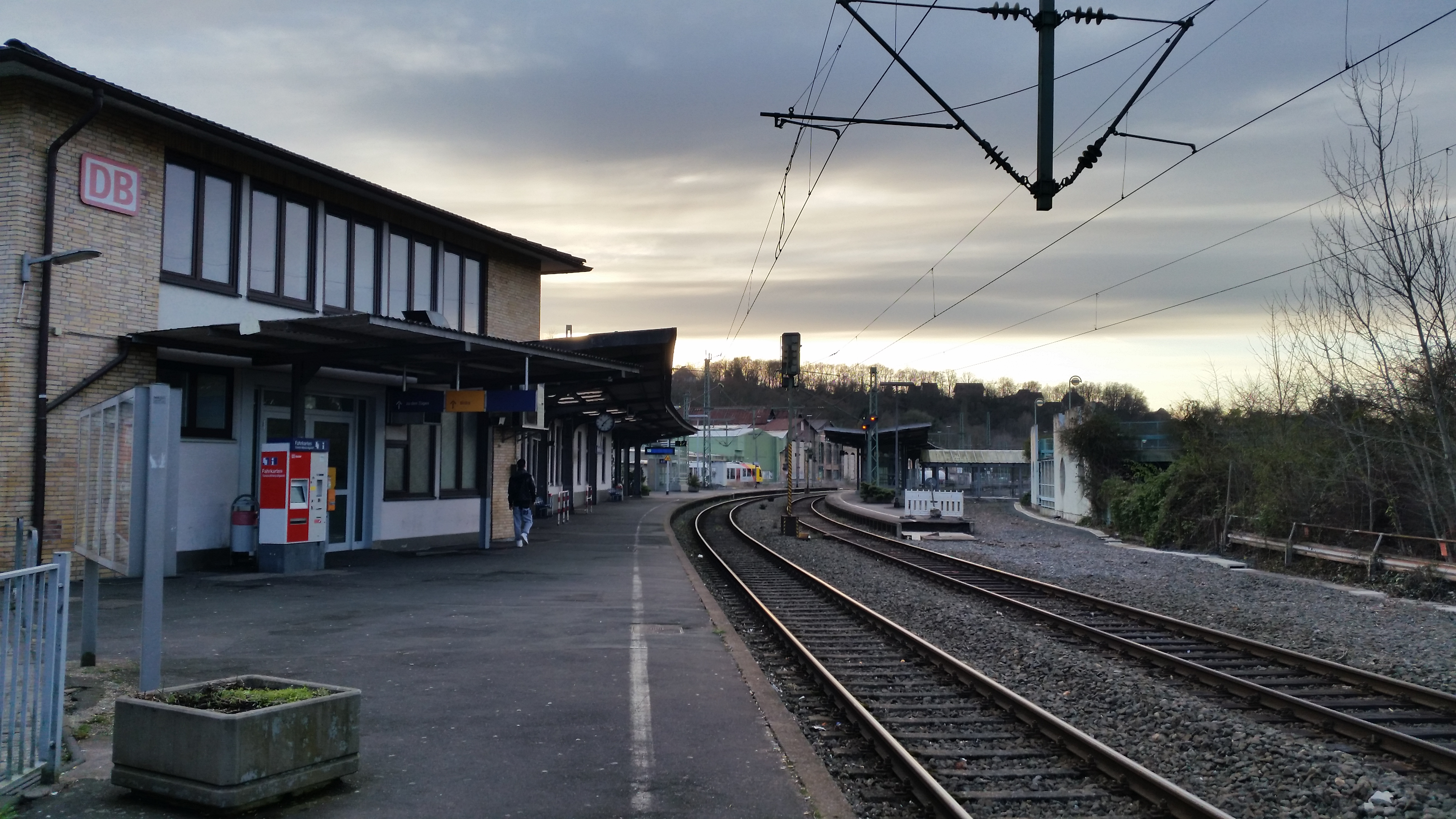
Betzdorf train station

The Betzdorf train station is served by five railway lines (RE9, Rhein-Sieg-Express.of DB, RB90, RB93 and RB96 of DreiLänderBahn, a section of Hessische Landesbahn (HLB) and RB97 of Westerwaldbahn GmbH. There's also access to the public local bus lines 270, 271, 276, 278, 290, 291, 292, 293, 295, 296, N71, N72 and N73. Betzdorf is located in the area of the transport association Verkehrsverbund Rhein-Mosel (VRM), in the zone number 926. There also is a Park and ride carpark at the train station.
