= Wega–Brilon Wald railway =

Railway line in Germany

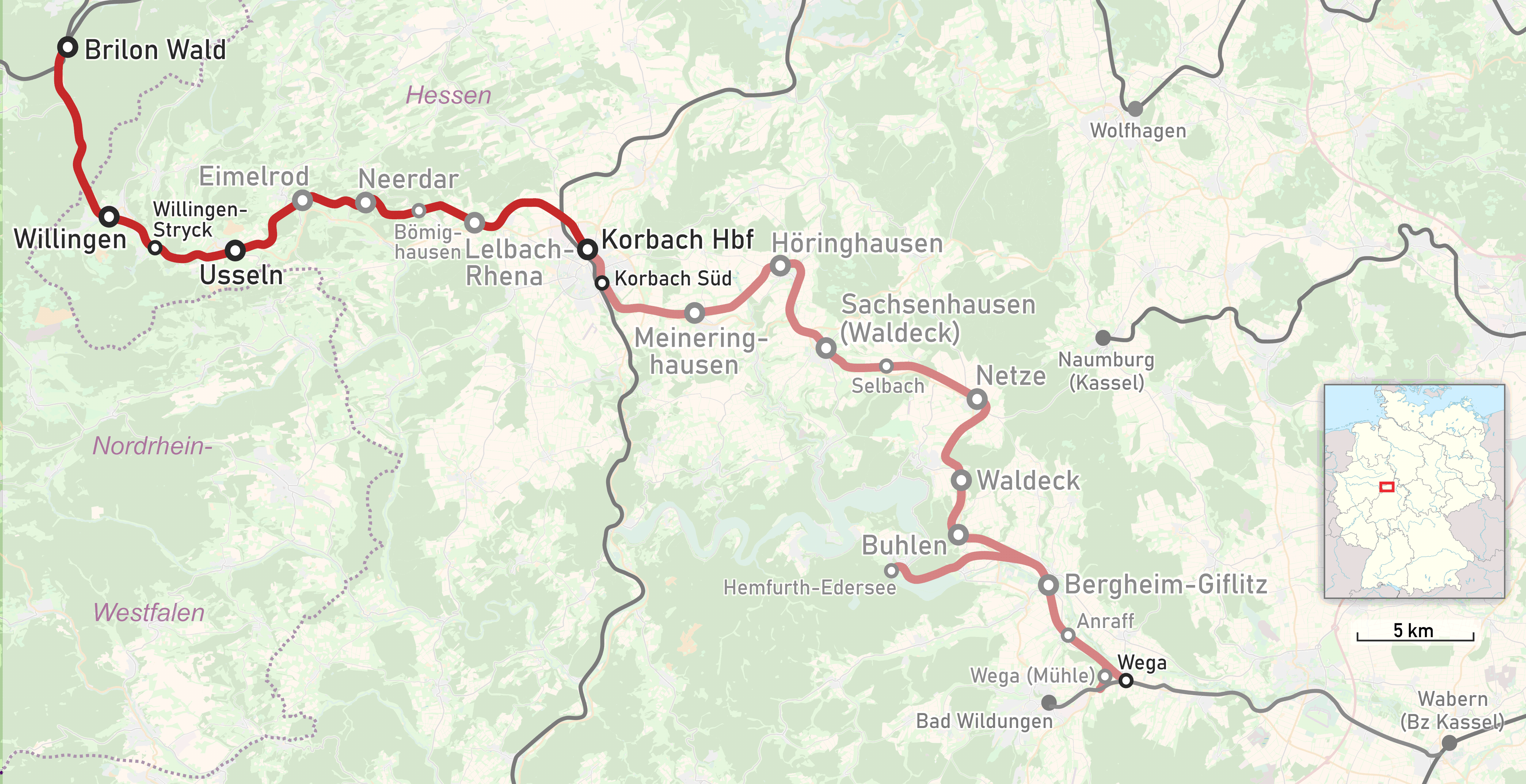

Overview
- Line number: 3944
- Locale: Hesse and North Rhine-Westphalia, Germany
- Termini: Brilon Wald; Wega

Service
- Route number: 622

Technical
- Line length: 67.07 km (41.68 mi)
- Track gauge: 1,435 mm (4 ft 8 1/2 in) standard gauge
- Operating speed: 100 kilometres per hour (62 mph)
- Maximum incline: 1.9%

The Wega–Brilon Wald railway is a 86.7 kilometre-long, single-track, partially disused secondary railway line from Wega in North Hesse to Brilon-Wald in North Rhine-Westphalia.

The disused eastern section from Wega to Korbach is called the Ederseebahn (Eder Railway) after the nearby Edersee (Lake Eder), while the section between Korbach and Brilon Wald is called the Uplandbahn (Upland Railway) after the Upland range.

== Route ==
=== Edersee Railway—Wega–Bergheim section ===
From the former Wega junction, the line ran northwest towards Korbach until May 1995, ran towards Korbach. First it ran through the Wega Tunnel directly west of Wega, piercing a wooded spur, and then continued up the Eder valley via Anraff and Giflitz (Bergheim-Giflitz station) to Bergheim.

=== E.ON connecting line (Bergheim–Hemfurth) ===
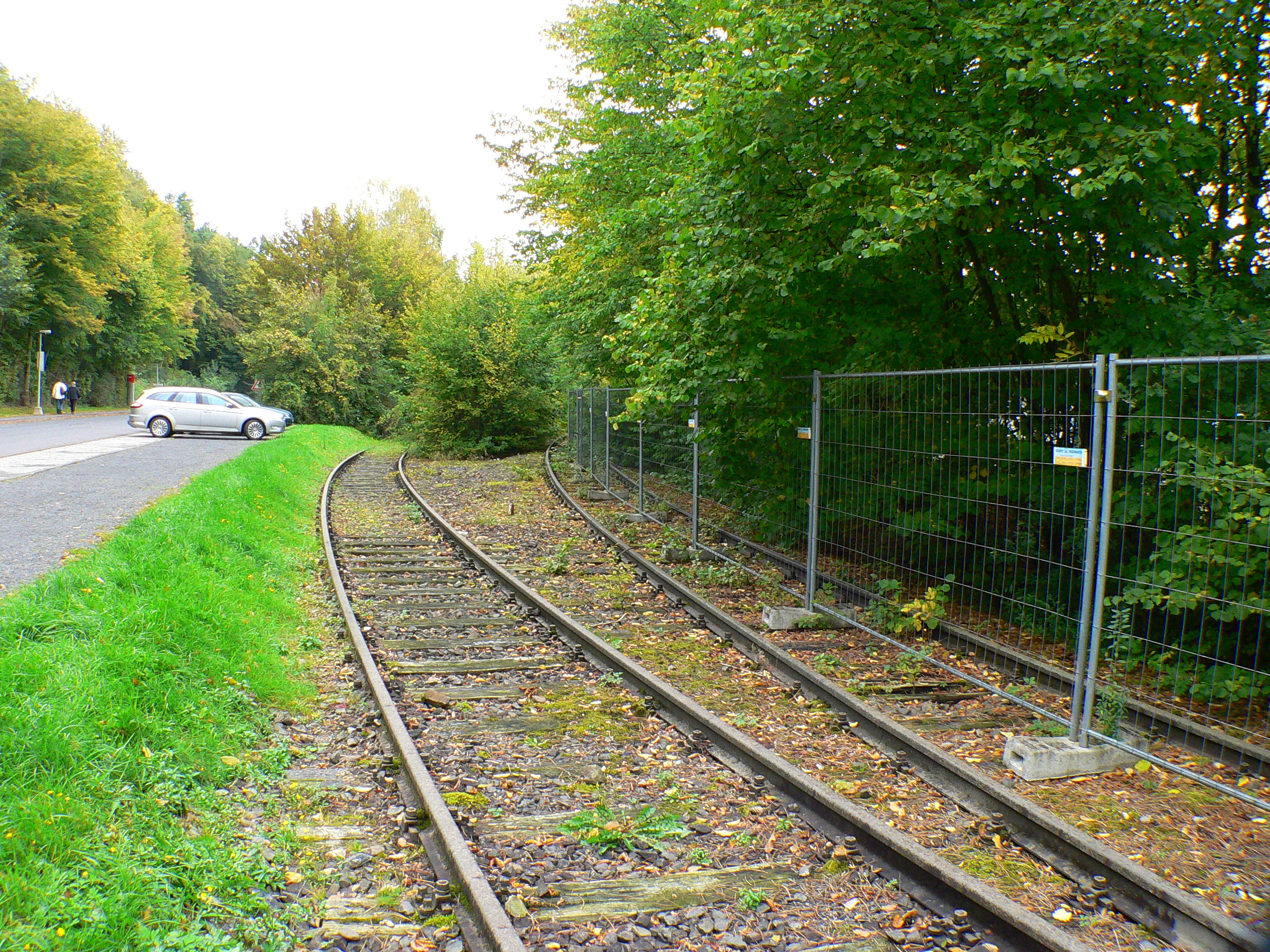
Remains of E.ON tracks

While the main line continues towards Korbach, the decommissioned E.ON connecting line ran from Bergheim through the Eder valley and along the Affolderner See reservoir to the Waldeck Pumped Storage Station near Hemfurth, a district of Hemfurth-Edersee. There it crossed the Eder to end at a terminal station near the valley station of the Peterskopfbahn funicular railway. A little to the north of it is the Edersee dam.

In 2006, a Draisine line was established on an approximately two-kilometre section between Affoldern and Hemfurth. A new stop with a 20-metre-long platform was built in its support in Affoldern at the Edersee Info-Point. The line ends directly in front of the Eder Bridge near Hemfurth. It was originally planned to extend the line to Hemfurth station, but this could not be carried out because the Eder Bridge is also used by road vehicles.

=== Edersee Railway—Bergheim–Korbach section ===
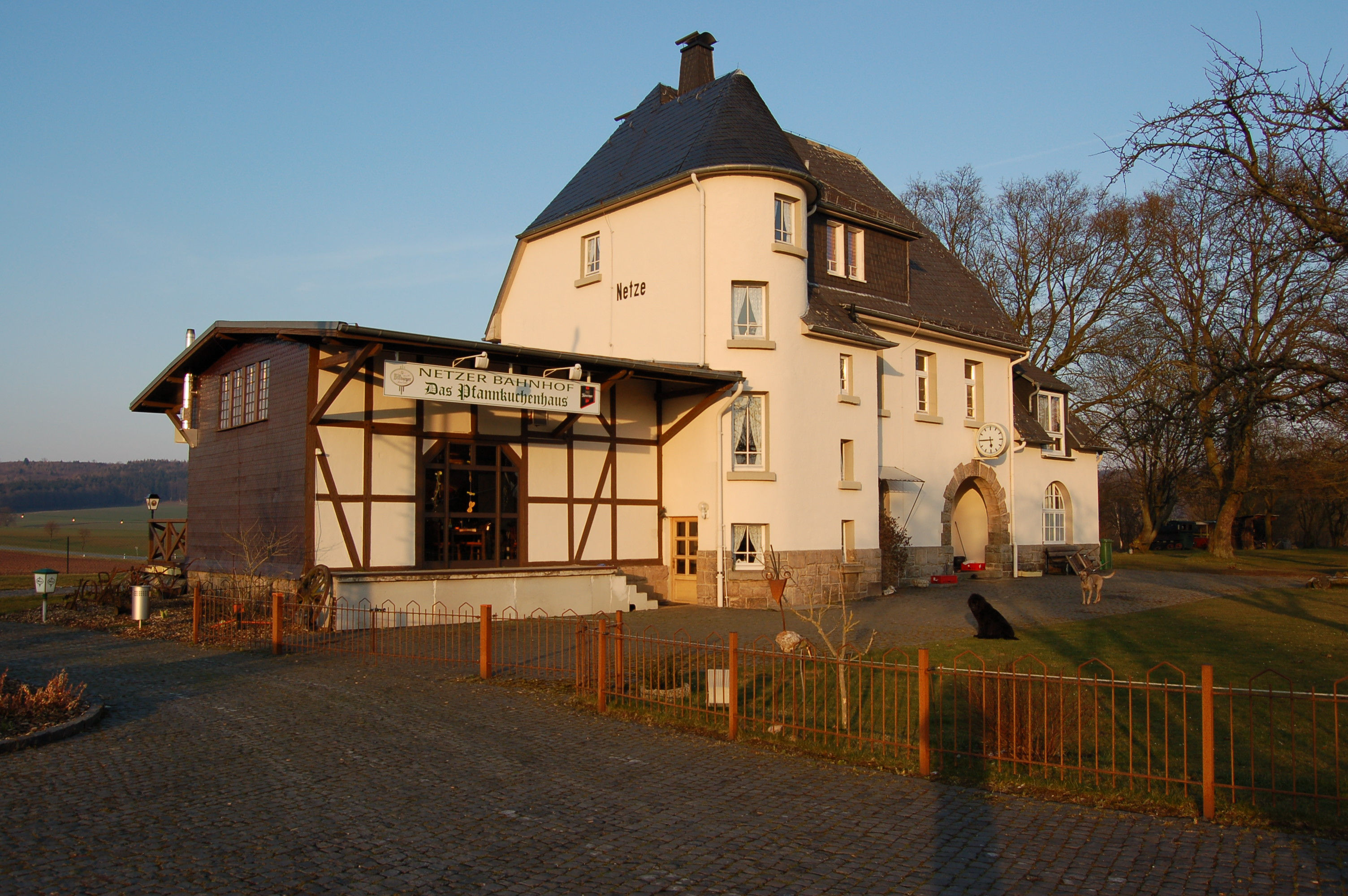
Edersee Railway—Netze station

Before Bergheim, the Edersee Railway crosses from the southern to the northern bank of the Eder and then climbs up the valley of the Netze next to federal road 485. It crosses the valleys of some stream, which required some complex bridge structures to be built. It runs to the Mehlen district of Lieschensruh, which has no station, over the 30 metre-high Buhlen Viaduct, which spans both the Netze and federal road 485, after which it runs through Buhlen and Waldeck-Ost to Netze. Waldeck station was the hub of operations on the line, which until its closure was a rustic branch line.

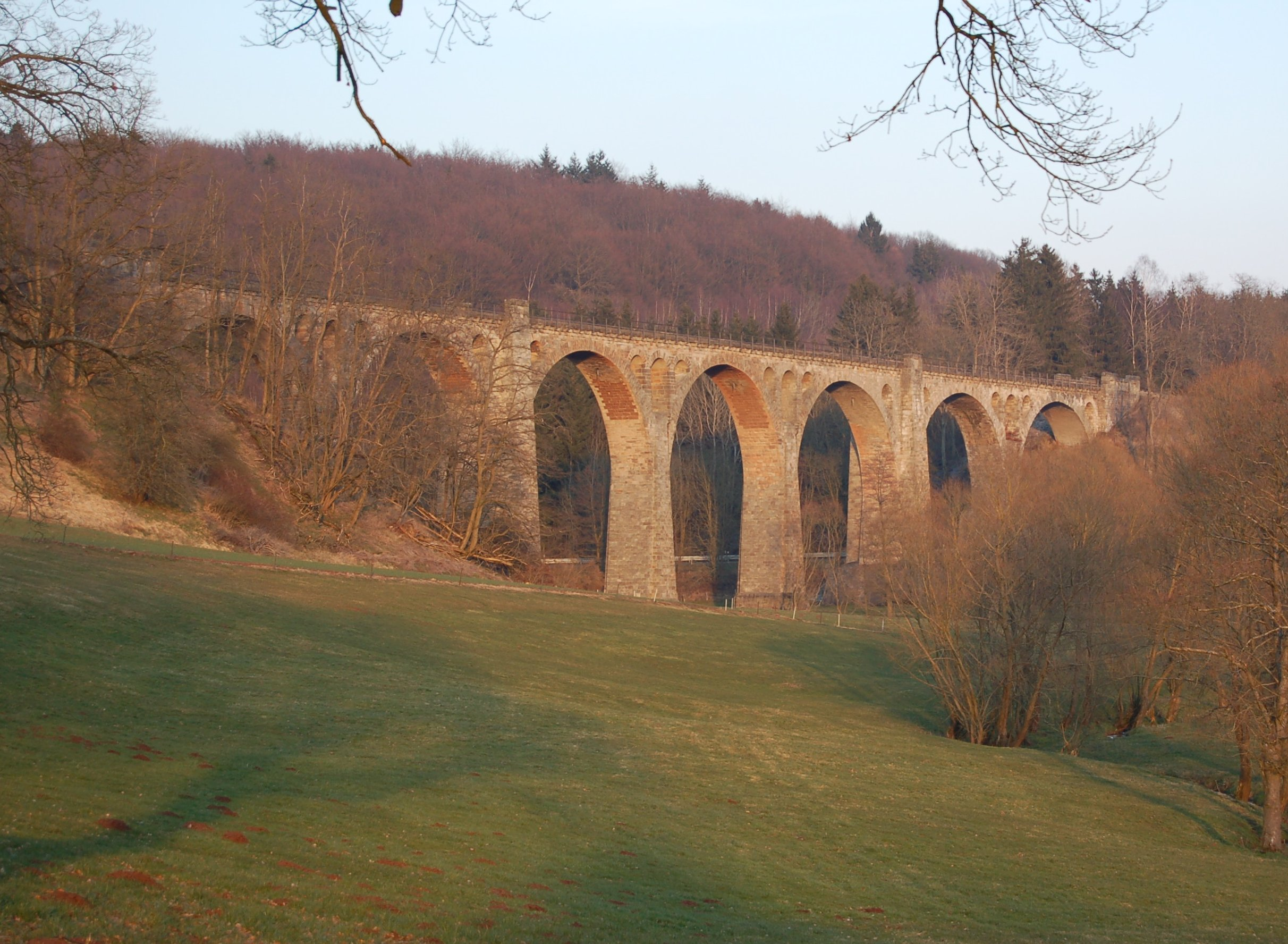
Selbach Viaduct of the Edersee Railway over the Reiherbach

The course of the line then runs westwards over Selbach Viaduct, which spans the Reiherbach valley near Selbach. The line then ran via Sachsenhausen, after which it passed through Sachsenhausen Tunnel under federal road 485, then continued north to Höringhausen. There it made an uneven, elongated 180° turn, and then ran to the west across the Werbe again on a high embankment.

The line passes through Meineringhausen and Meineringhäusen Tunnel, passing under federal road 251, and a little later it crosses the Am Melm track while running next to route 251. It reaches Korbach, where the line again passes over a bridge over federal road 251, which forms Korbach's south ring. There is a connection to the Warburg–Sarnau railway at Korbach Hauptbahnhof, where the disused Edersee Railway ends.

=== Upland Railway—Korbach–Usseln section ===
Beyond Korbach (384 m above sea level) the Uplandbahn (Upland Railway), which is still in operation, runs slightly north-west along federal road 251 and climbs significantly until shortly after Usseln (580 to 620 m). First it passes through Lelbach to the now closed Lelbach-Rhena station, after which it runs to the north of Rhena. Here it crosses a small tributary of the Rhena in the catchment area of the Neerdar on the Rhena Viaduct (Rhenaer Viadukt).

This is followed by Bömighausen station north of Bömighausen and then Bömighäusen Viaduct (Bömighäuser Viadukt), which crosses a small stream in the Neerdar catchment area. The line reaches Neerdar station to the north of Neerdar.

Passing Eimelrod station to the south of Eimelrod, the railway line runs to Usseln after bridging federal road 251 again, where it crosses the Diemel on the Usseln Viaduct (Usselner Viadukt). All stations between Korbach and Usseln are now out of use.

=== Upland Railway—Usseln–Brilon Wald section ===
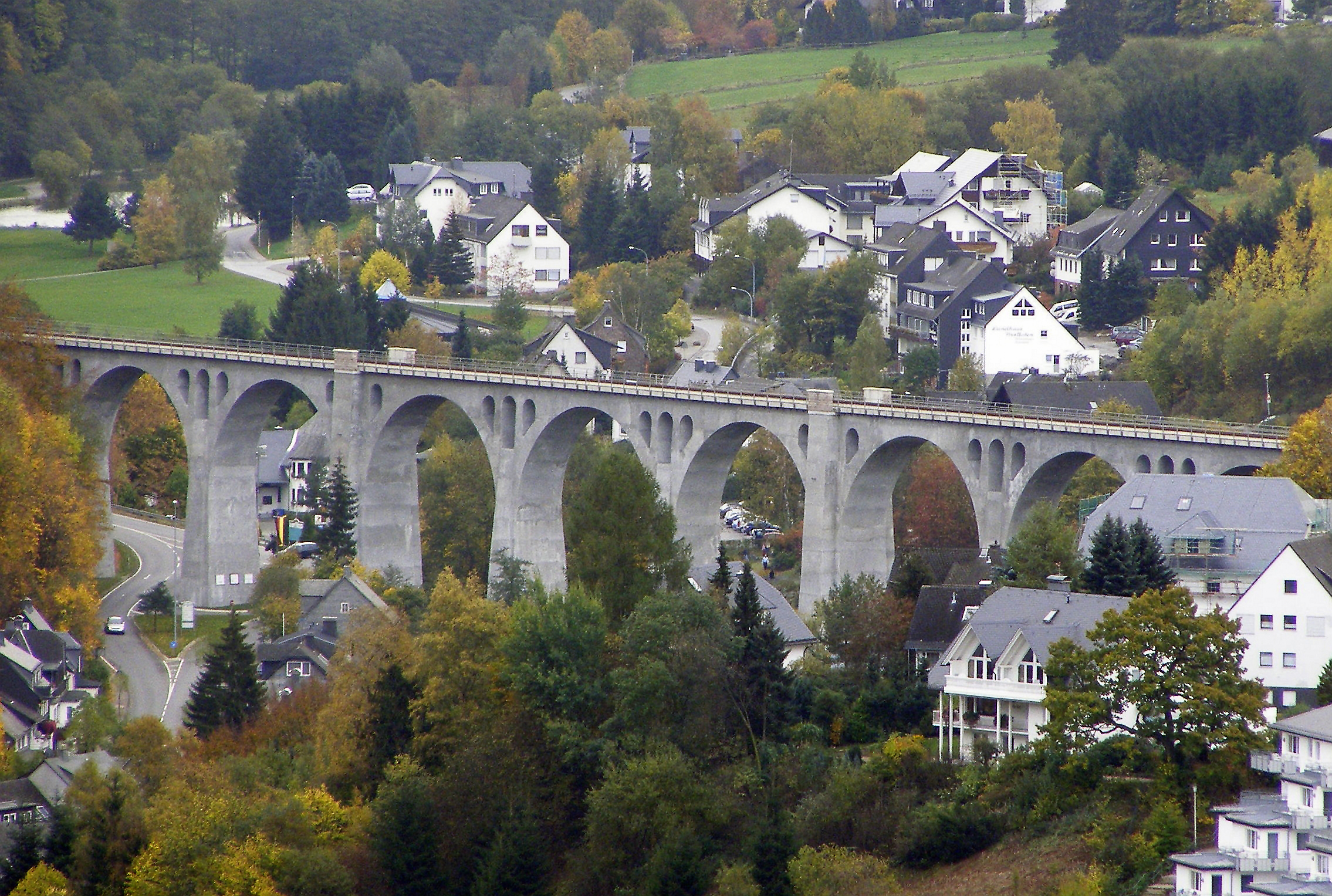
Willingen Viaduct of the Upland Railway over the Itter

The last part through the Upland is downhill. After Usseln, the line reaches Stryck station, northeast of Stryck, after again crossing under federal road 251, where trains only stop when ski jumping events are held at the Mühlenkopfschanze. The line now turns to the northeast and crosses the Itter on the Willingen Viaduct (Willinger Viadukt) to reach Willingen.

Beyond Willingen it runs to the north in the valley of the Hoppecke, where it crosses the state border with North Rhine-Westphalia and the Hochsauerland district, towards Brilon-Wald. There is a connection to the Upper Ruhr Valley Railway, which connects Hagen with Warburg. The Wabern–Brilon Wald railway ends there. There is another connection to the Alme Valley Railway, which was restored for passenger traffic as far as Brilon Stadt in December 2011. A large proportion of the trains from Korbach terminate at Brilon Stadt.

== History ==
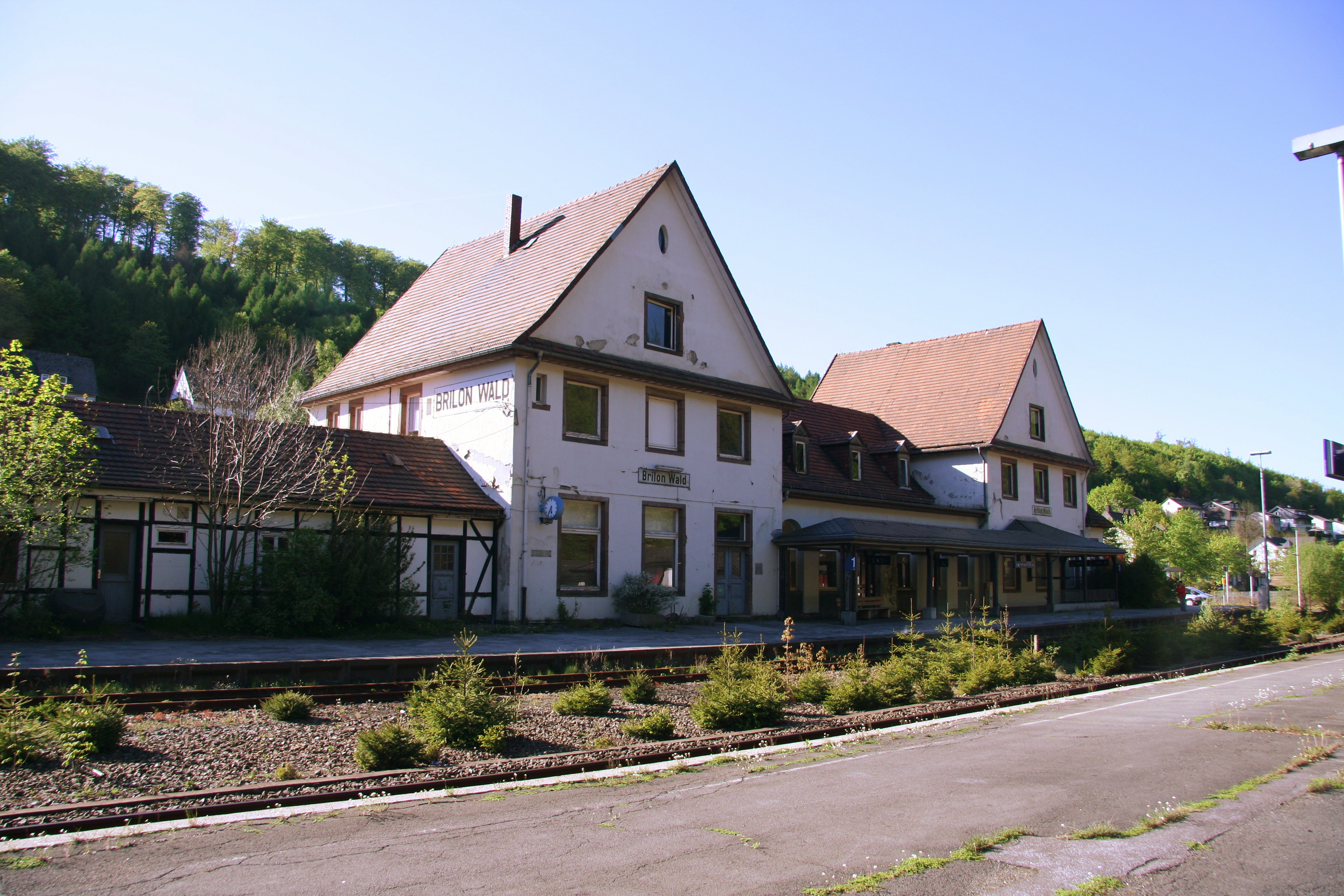
Brilon Wald station

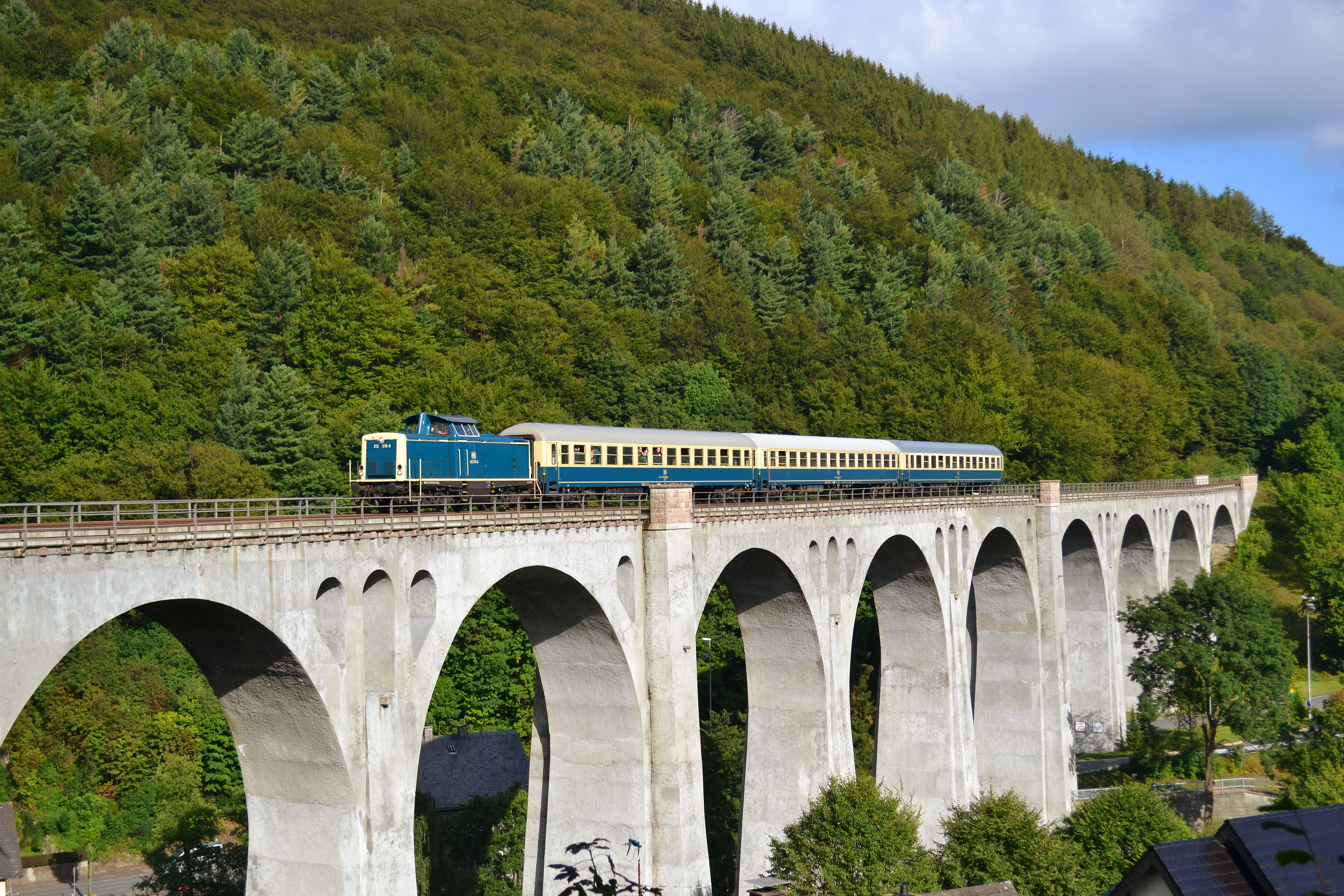
A special service on the Willingen Viaduct in September 2012

The line was opened in several sections:

- Bad Wildungen–Buhlen on 1 February 1909
- Buhlen–Waldeck on 1 May 1911
- Waldeck–Korbach on 1 June 1912
- Korbach–Lelbach-Rhena on 30 May 1914
- Brilon Wald–Willingen on 12 October 1914
- Lelbach-Rhena–Eimelrod on 1 May 1916
- Eimelrod–Usseln on 14 August 1916
- Usseln–Willingen on 2 April 1917

Until about 1982, a Heckeneilzug ("hedge express"; a train that runs express in metropolitan areas, but stops at all stations in rural areas) ran between Korbach and Brilon as part of a route from Frankfurt to Bremerhaven (and to Hamburg for a time). A pair of express trains ran from Bad Wildungen to Amsterdam and back until 1991.

Traffic between Bergheim-Giflitz and Korbach was stopped on 27 May 1995 due to the need to renovate bridge structures. Subsequently, the line from Bad Wildungen via Bergheim-Giflitz to Hemfurth-Edersee was used for excursion traffic, using the E.ON connecting track to the Waldeck Pumped Storage Station running between Bergheim-Giflitz and Hemfurth-Edersee. Traffic was stopped again on 3 October 2001 due to the need to rehabilitate the line. Reactivation of the line is still under discussion.

Freight traffic between Korbach and Bad Wildungen was discontinued on 1 January 1992.

== Current operations ==
=== Korbach–Brilon Wald ===
A basic two-hour cycle operates on the section between Korbach and Brilon Wald. This is increased by additional trains in the morning and afternoon. Due to Willingen's touristic importance, a significantly denser train service is provided between Brilon Wald and Willingen from Friday to Sunday, with some services running to/from Hagen and Dortmund, offering further travel options.

The Uplandbahn between Korbach and Brilon Wald is particularly important for the development of the tourist and winter sports location of Willingen in the Waldeck Upland. Local passenger services are operated by the Kurhessenbahn. The average speed of the trains is around 53 km/h.

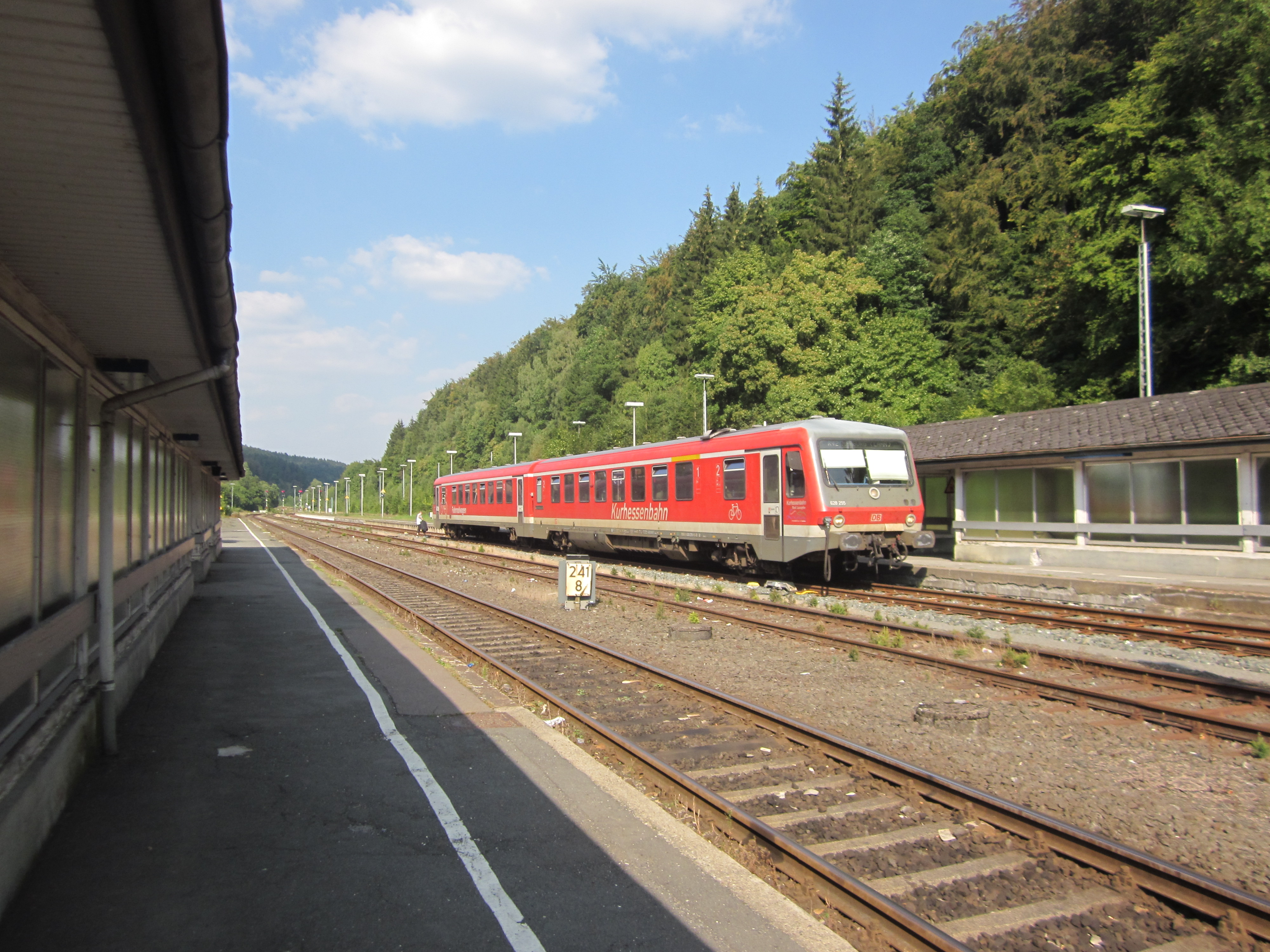
Kurhessenbahn railcar on the Bestwig–Marburg route in Brilon Wald

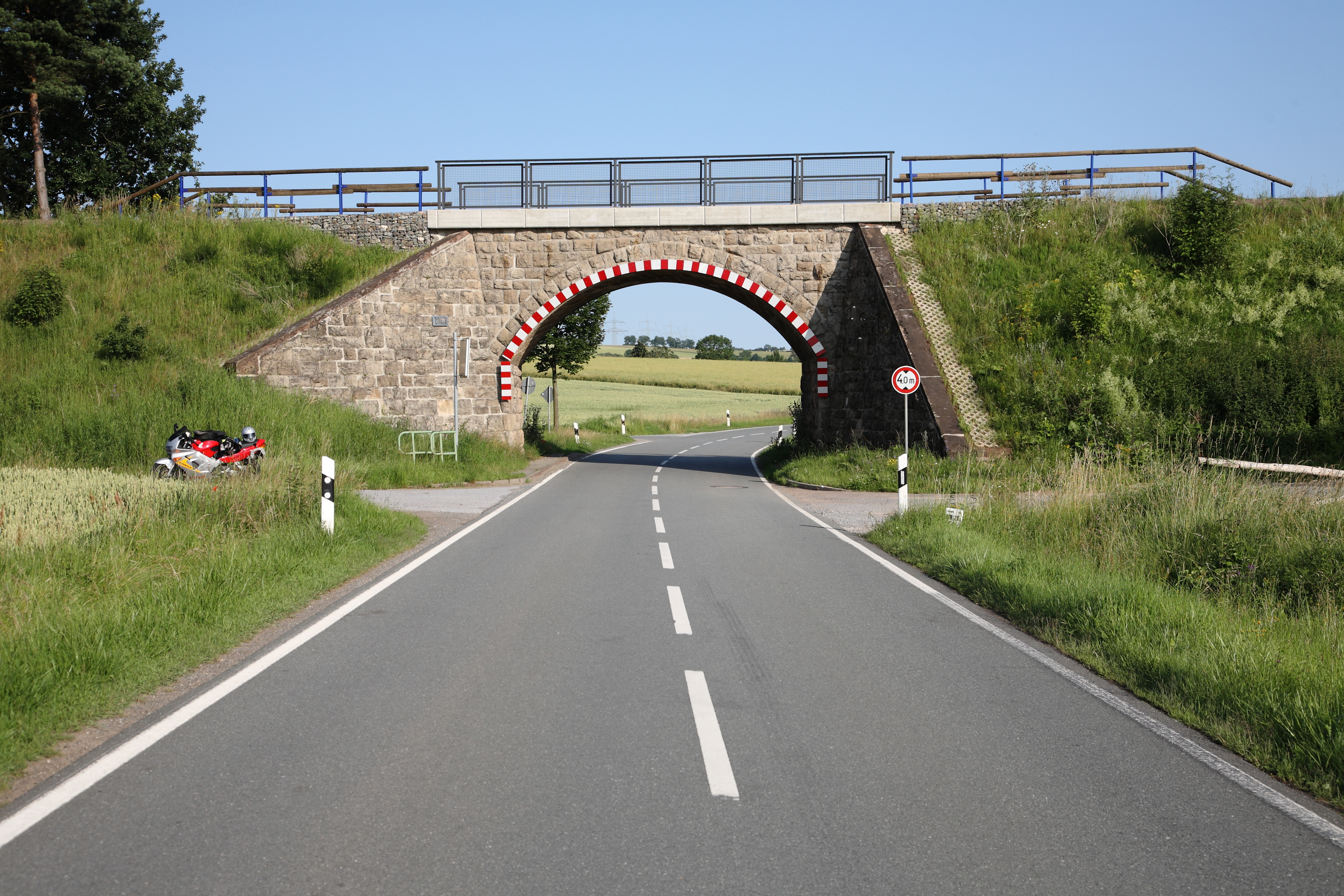
Railway bridge of the former route in Waldeck-Höringhausen over district road K15 (looking towards Höringhausen).

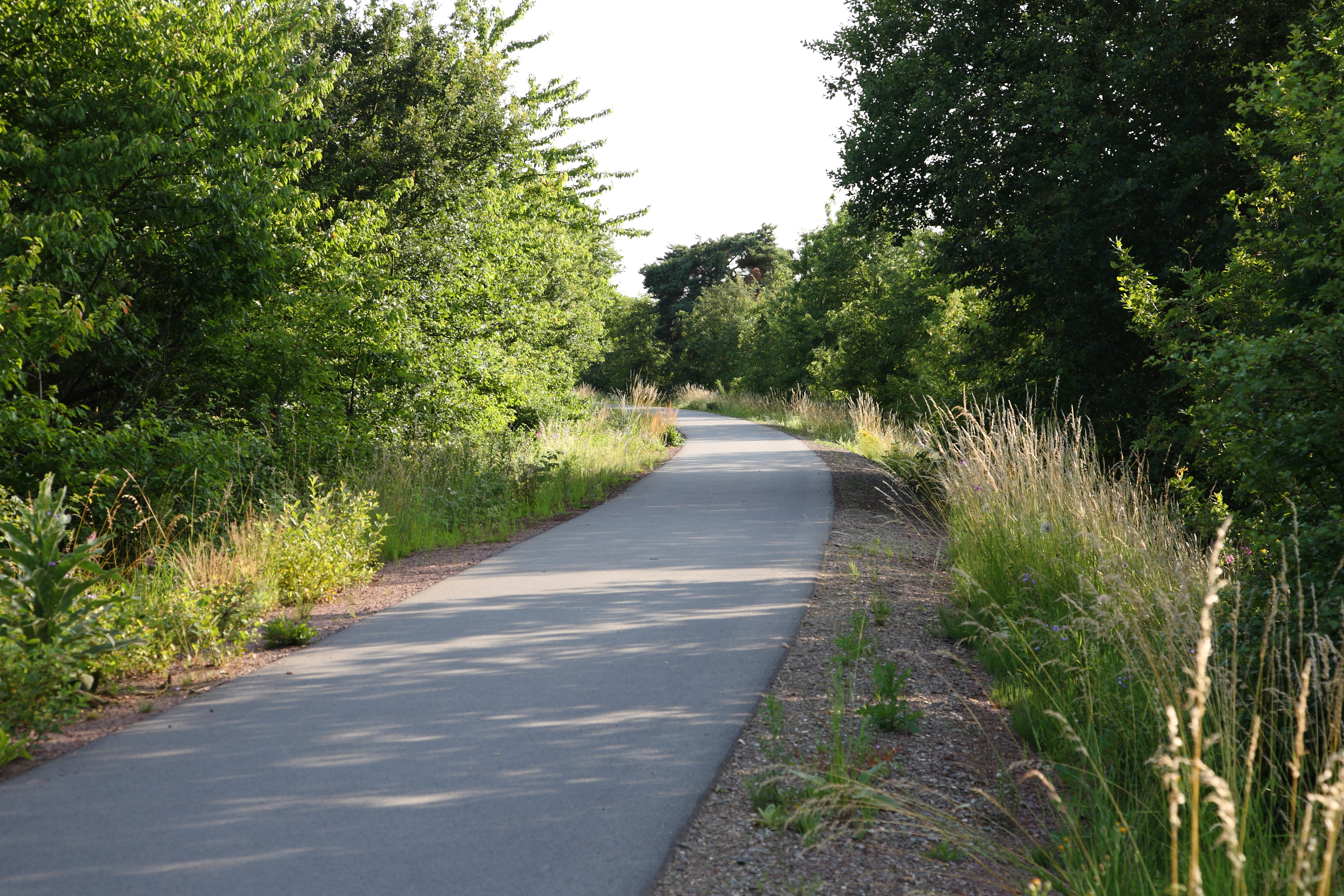
Cycle path on the route in Waldeck-Höringhausen (looking towards Korbach).

Both sections, which are still being used, have been threatened with closure several times in recent years. The line between Korbach and Willingen was temporarily out of order due to the dilapidation of Willingen Viaduct. The renovation of the four viaducts in Rhena, Bömighausen, Usseln and Willingen enabled the Kurhessenbahn to resume continuous operation. The maximum permissible speed has been increased to 100 km/h. Control of Usseln and Willingen stations was transferred to a ZSB2000 signal box built by Scheidt & Bachmann under a nationwide pilot project, with the train controller being based in Korbach. In the meantime, the Signalisierter Zugleitbetrieb operating procedure (a form of direct traffic control) was authorised and Korbach Hauptbahnhof was equipped with combination signals (Ks-Signalsystem). Since November 2009, the line has been remotely controlled by the train controller at Kassel Hauptbahnhof. In 2015, as part of the line modernisation, the Untere Edertalbahn (Korbach–Frankenberg) section was restored. Since then the R 42 trains that run from Marburg have connected to Brilon Stadt.

=== Edersee Railway rail trail ===
The 26.139 kilometre-long Edersee Railway rail trail (Ederseebahn-Radweg) on the Korbach–Buhlen section of the disused Edersee Railway was established from 2008 to 2012. This includes tunnels and bridges.
