= Rhena =

Rhena may refer to:

- Rhena (Korbach), a district of the town Korbach in Hesse, Germany
- Rhena (Neerdar), a river of Hesse, Germany, tributary of the Neerdar
