= Neerdar =

Neerdar may refer to:

- Neerdar, Willingen, a district of Willingen, a community in Hesse, Germany
- Neerdar (Wilde Aa), a river of Hesse, Germany, tributary of the Wilde Aa
