= WVG =

WVG may refer to:

- Watts Varrio Grape, a predecessor gang to the Grape Street Watts Crips
- The policy area covering Welfare, Public Health and Family in the Flemish Government
- Westfälische Verkehrsgesellschaft, a company involved in providing buses for Brilon Stadt station
