= Rhena (Neerdar) =

River in Germany

Location
- Country: Germany
- States: Hesse

Physical characteristics
- Mouth
  - location: Neerdar
  - coordinates: 51.2753°N 8.7725°E

Basin features
- Progression: Neerdar→ Wilde Aa→ Orke→ Eder→ Fulda→ Weser→ North Sea

Rhena is a river of Hesse, Germany. It flows into the Neerdar west of Korbach.

== See also ==
- List of rivers of Hesse
