= Brilon Wald station =

Railway station in Brilon, Germany

Brilon Wald
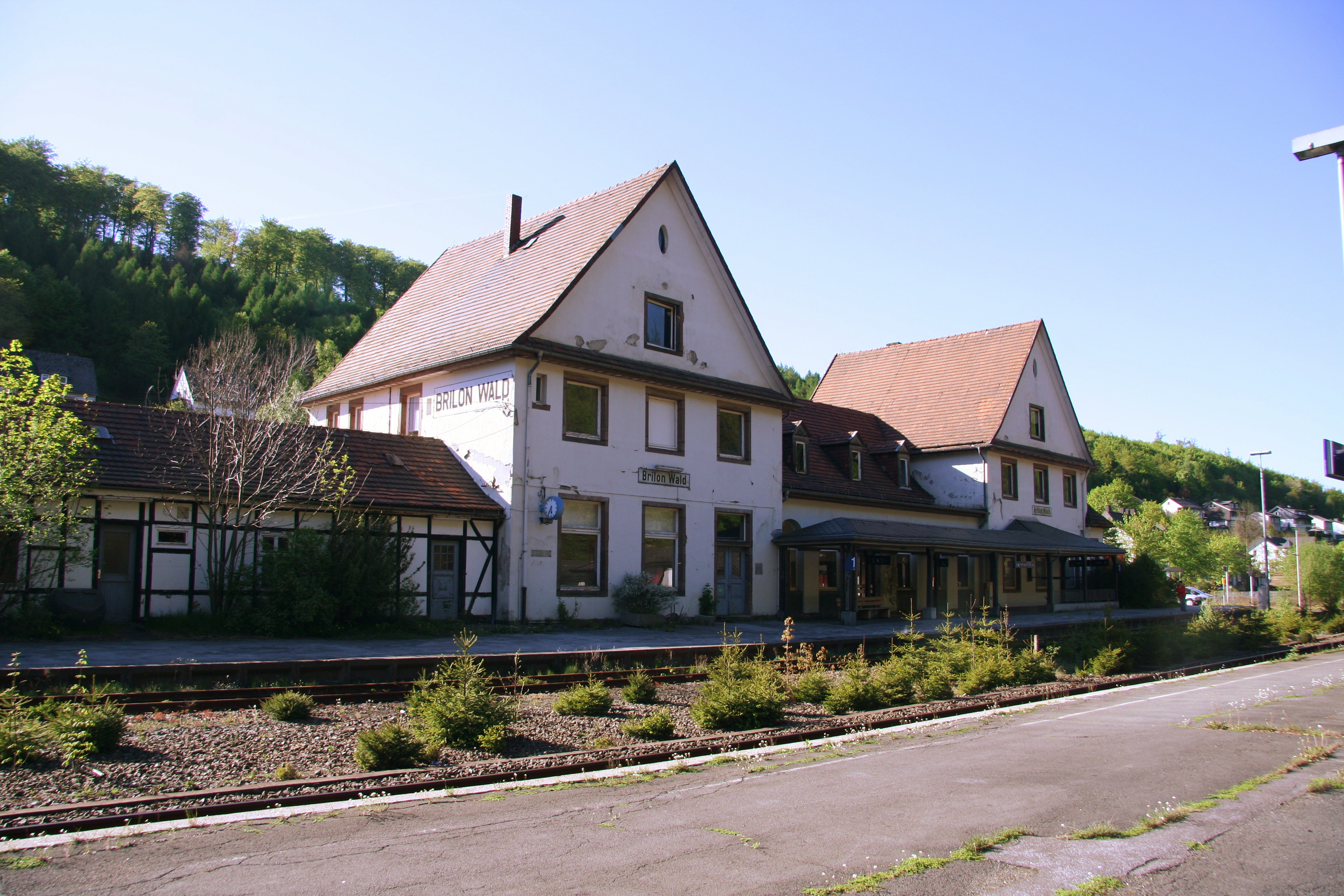

General information
- Location: Korbacher Straße 10, Brilon Wald, North Rhine-Westphalia; Germany
- Coordinates: 51°20′57″N 8°34′34″E
- System: Through station
- Owner: Deutsche Bahn
- Operator: DB Netz; DB Station&Service
- Lines: Upper Ruhr Valley Railway (KBS 435); Upland Railway (KBS 439); Alme Valley Railway (KBS 435)
- Platforms: 2

Construction
- Accessible: Yes

Other information
- Station code: 888
- DS100 code: EBRW
- IBNR: 8000054
- Category: 5
- Fare zone: Westfalentarif: 44786
- Website: www.bahnhof.de

History
- Opened: 10 February 1873

Services
Preceding station	DB Regio NRW	Following station
Olsberg towards Hagen Hbf	RE 17	Hoppecke towards Kassel-Wilhelmshöhe
Olsberg towards Dortmund Hbf	RE 57	Brilon Stadt Terminus
Preceding station	Kurhessenbahn	Following station
Brilon Stadt Terminus	RB 97	Willingen towards Marburg (Lahn)
Location
- Location within North Rhine-Westphalia

The Brilon Wald station is a station on the Upper Ruhr Valley Railway (German: Obere Ruhrtalbahn) in the German state of North Rhine-Westphalia. It was opened 5.5 km south of Brilon in the forest (Wald) with the construction of the line on 10 February 1873, as it was impractical to build the railway through Brilon. The station was called Brilon-Corbach until 1880, when the current name was adopted. The Bergisch-Märkische Railway Company (Bergisch-Märkische Eisenbahn-Gesellschaft) created the small town of Brilon Wald at the same time. The station is classified by Deutsche Bahn as a category 5 station.

Brilon Wald station is served by passenger services by line RE 17 (Sauerland-Express) every 60 minutes, line RE 97/RB97 (Lahn-Sauerland-Express) every 60 or 120 minutes and by RE 57 (Dortmund-Sauerland-Express) services every 120 minutes:

Line	Name	Route
RE 17	Sauerland-Express	Hagen – Fröndenberg – Arnsberg (Westf) – Brilon Wald – Warburg (–Kassel Hbf – Kassel-Wilhelmshöhe)
RE 57	Dortmund-Sauerland-Express	Dortmund – Fröndenberg – Arnsberg (Westf) – Bestwig –Winterberg (Westf) – Brilon-Wald – Brilon Stadt
RE 97/RB 97	Lahn-Sauerland-Express	Brilon Stadt – Brilon Wald – Willingen – Korbach – Frankenberg – Cölbe – Marburg

Brilon Wald station is also served by bus line 482 running between Brilon and Gudenhagen every 60 minutes.
