= Helle (Orke) =

River in North Rhine-Westphalia, Germany

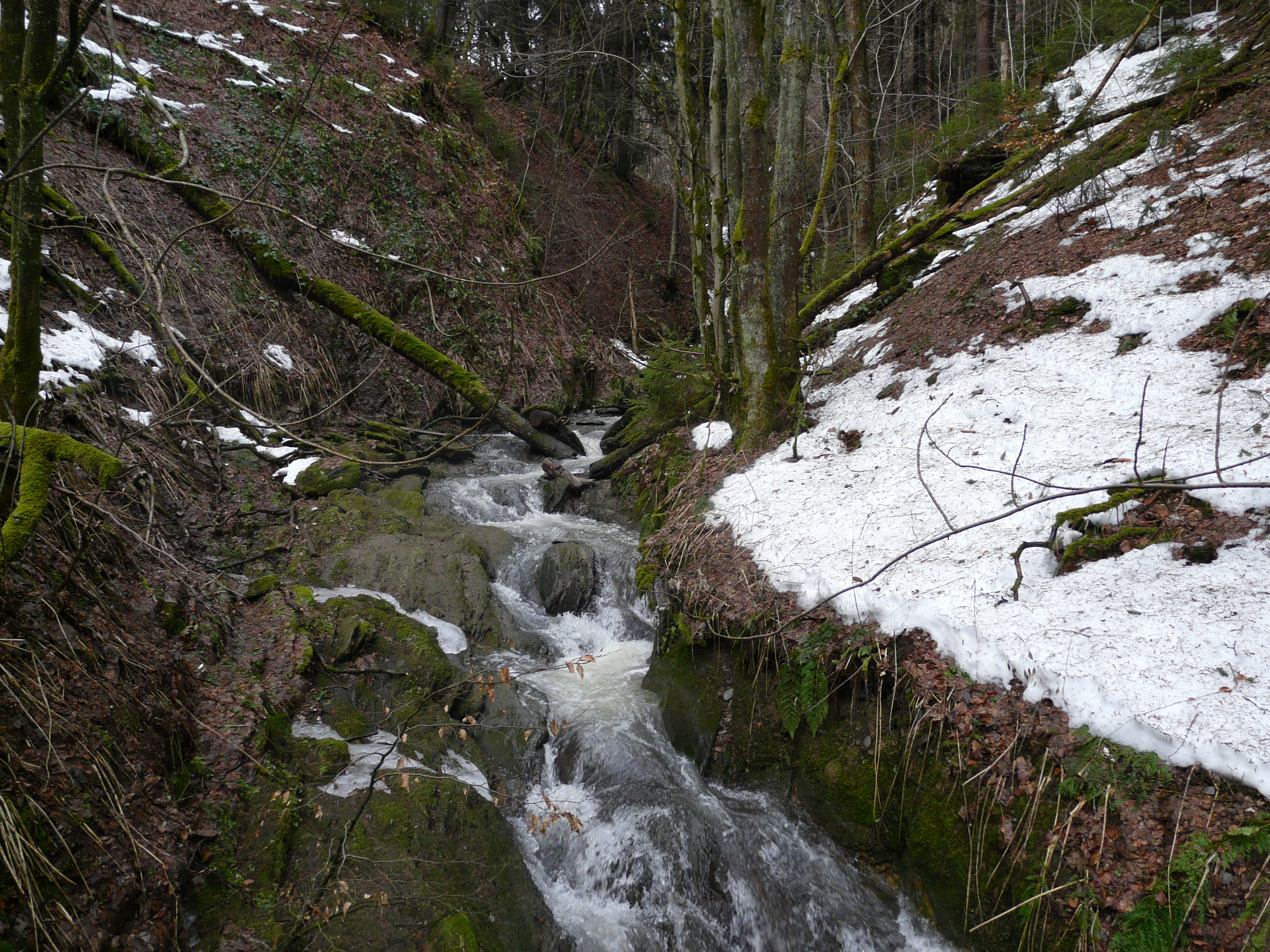

Location
- Country: Germany
- States: North Rhine-Westphalia

Physical characteristics
- Mouth
  - location: Orke
  - coordinates: 51.1964°N 8.5686°E

Basin features
- Progression: Orke→ Eder→ Fulda→ Weser→ North Sea

Helle is a small river of North Rhine-Westphalia, Germany. It is 3.7 km long and a right tributary of the Orke near Winterberg.

== See also ==
- List of rivers of North Rhine-Westphalia
