= Medebach (Orke) =

River in Germany

Location
- Country: Germany
- State: North Rhine-Westphalia

Physical characteristics
- Mouth
  - location: Orke
  - coordinates: 51.1726°N 8.7252°E
- Length: 7.9 km (4.9 mi)

Basin features
- Progression: Orke→ Eder→ Fulda→ Weser→ North Sea

Medebach (German pronunciation: [ˈmeːdəbax]) is a river of North Rhine-Westphalia, Germany. It is a left tributary of the Orke near the town Medebach.

== See also ==
- List of rivers of North Rhine-Westphalia
