= Alme Valley Railway =

Railway line in Germany

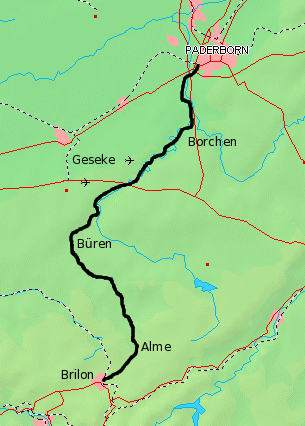
- Former route

Overview
- Native name: Almetalbahn
- Line number: 2961
- Locale: North Rhine-Westphalia, Germany
- Termini: Paderborn Hbf; Brilon Wald

Service
- Route number: ex 174d, 198p, 198e, 298g, 238e, 345

History
- Opening: 20 Oct. 1899
- Closure of passenger services: 30 May 1981

Technical
- Line length: 59.7 km (37.1 mi)
- Track gauge: 1,435 mm (4 ft 8 1/2 in) standard gauge
- Operating speed: <60 km/h (37.3 mph)

The Alme Valley Railway (German: Almetalbahn) was an approximately 60 km long, mostly single-track branch line from Paderborn via Buren to Brilon in the German state of North Rhine-Westphalia. It is named after the Alme river and runs through its valley in a north–south direction. The line is disused and dismantled between Paderborn and Büren-Weiberg, but it has not been formally closed. The remaining line between Büren-Weiberg and Brilon Wald (forest) was for a long time only used for freight and museum trains, but the section between Brilon Stadt (town) and Brilon Wald has been back in use by regional services since 2011.

== History ==
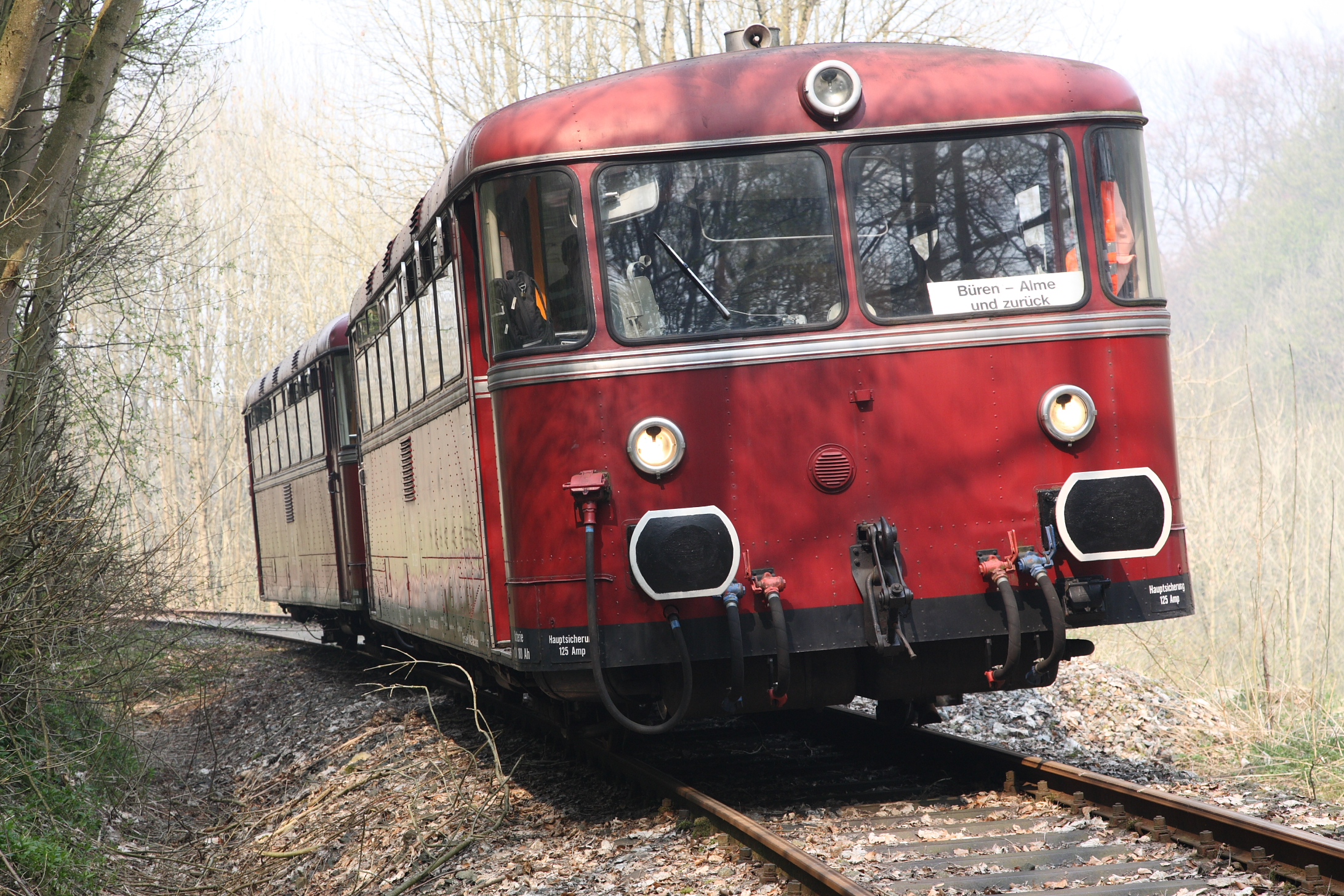
Uerdingen railbus on the line, April 2009

The line was opened between 1898 and 1901. At the same time the Geseke–Büren railway, which connected to the Hamm–Warburg railway, was planned and built.

=== Opening and operation ===
The northern section from Paderborn to Büren was opened on 20 October 1898 and the rest of the line between Büren and Brilon was completed on 1 April 1901. The line was used by passengers and freight traffic, originally hauled by steam locomotives and later by diesel locomotives. Passenger services were eventually operated with diesel multiple units.

The large air ammunition depot of Harth, which was concealed in the forest near Ringelstein from 1936 to 1945, was connected to the line at Ringelstein station. In the Second World War, the Alme Valley Railway was more frequently the target of strafing by the Allies from the beginning of 1945. For instance on 13 February 1945 Alme station was raided. Two locomotives were destroyed. Two buildings caught fire and several buildings were hit.

From 1950 onwards, the line was connected even to the long-distance network via the daily Heckeneilzug (hedgerow) service, running on the Bremen–Paderborn–Büren–Brilon–Frankfurt route.

=== Gradual closure of line and residual traffic ===
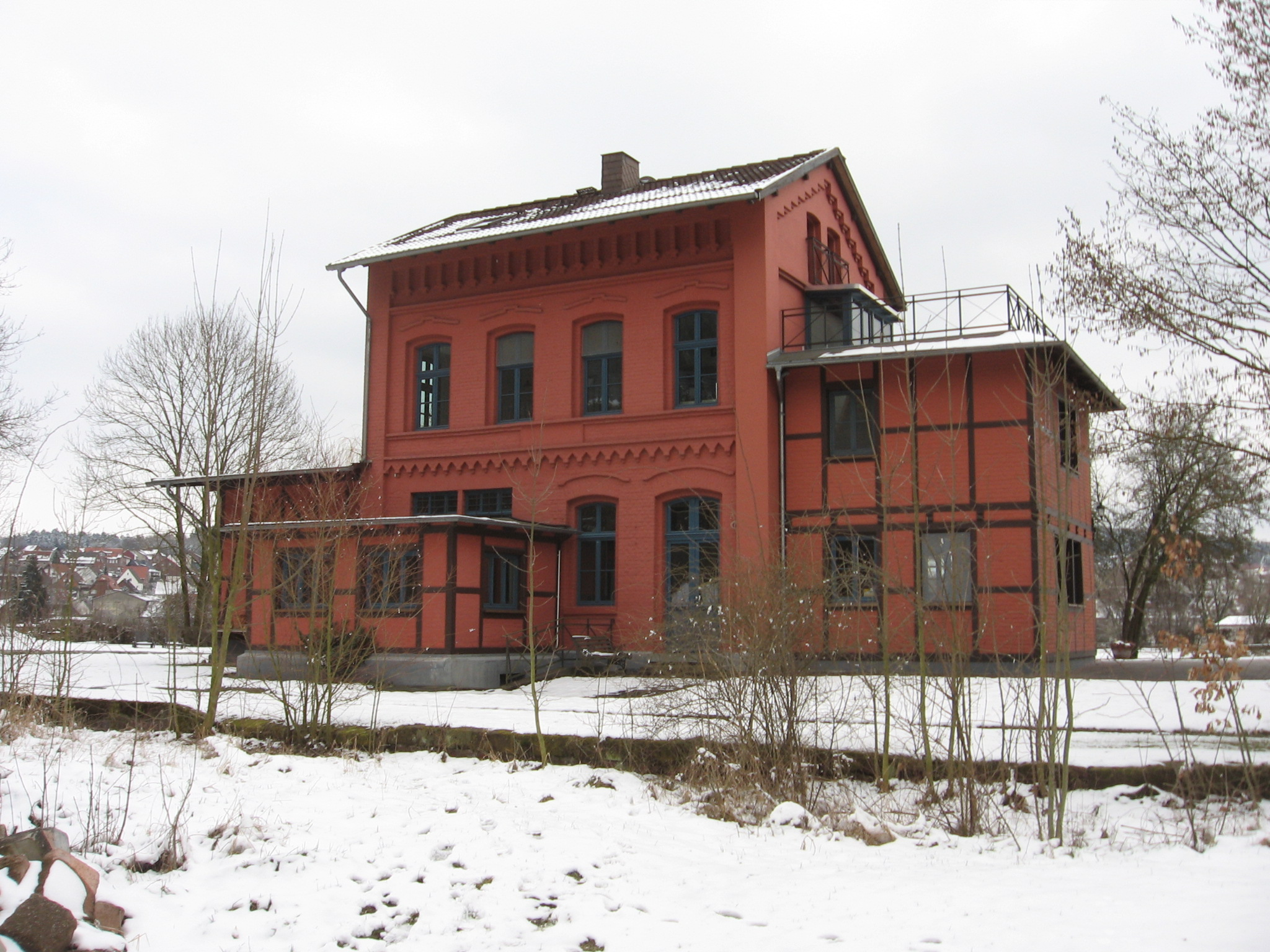
Former Alme Valley Railway station in Brenken

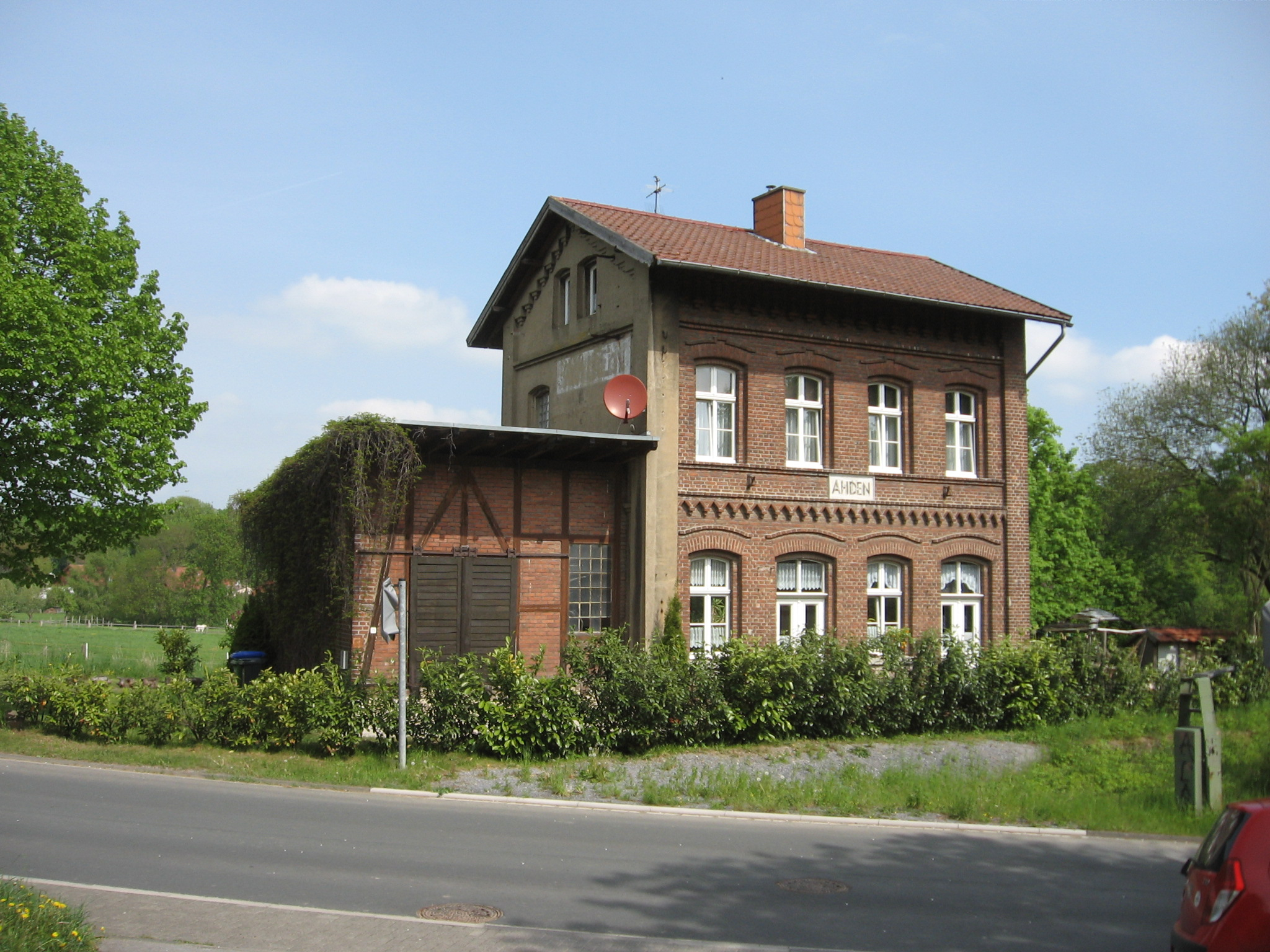
Former Alme Valley Railway station in Ahden

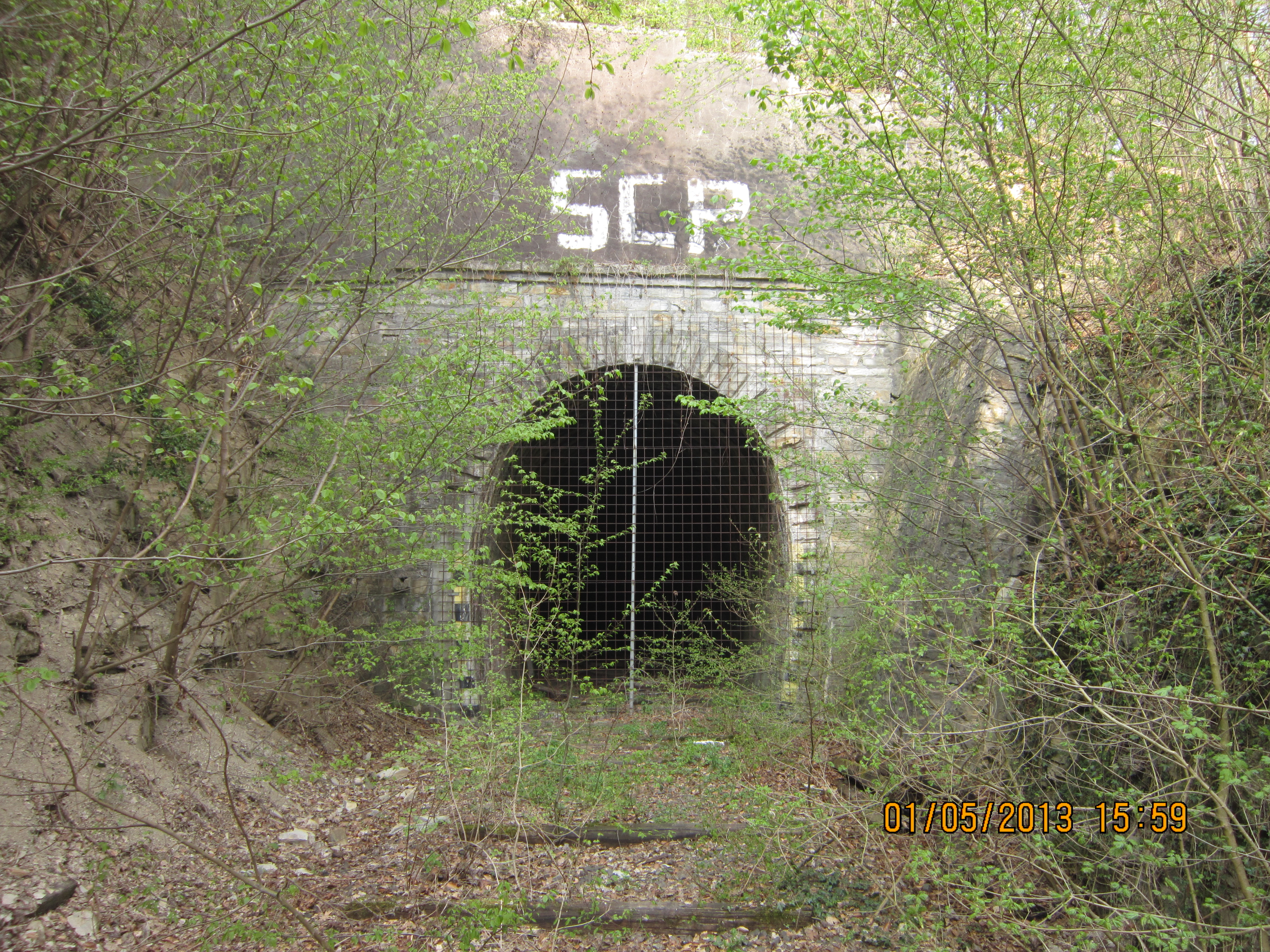
South portal of the Wewelsburg Tunnel with a length of 143 m

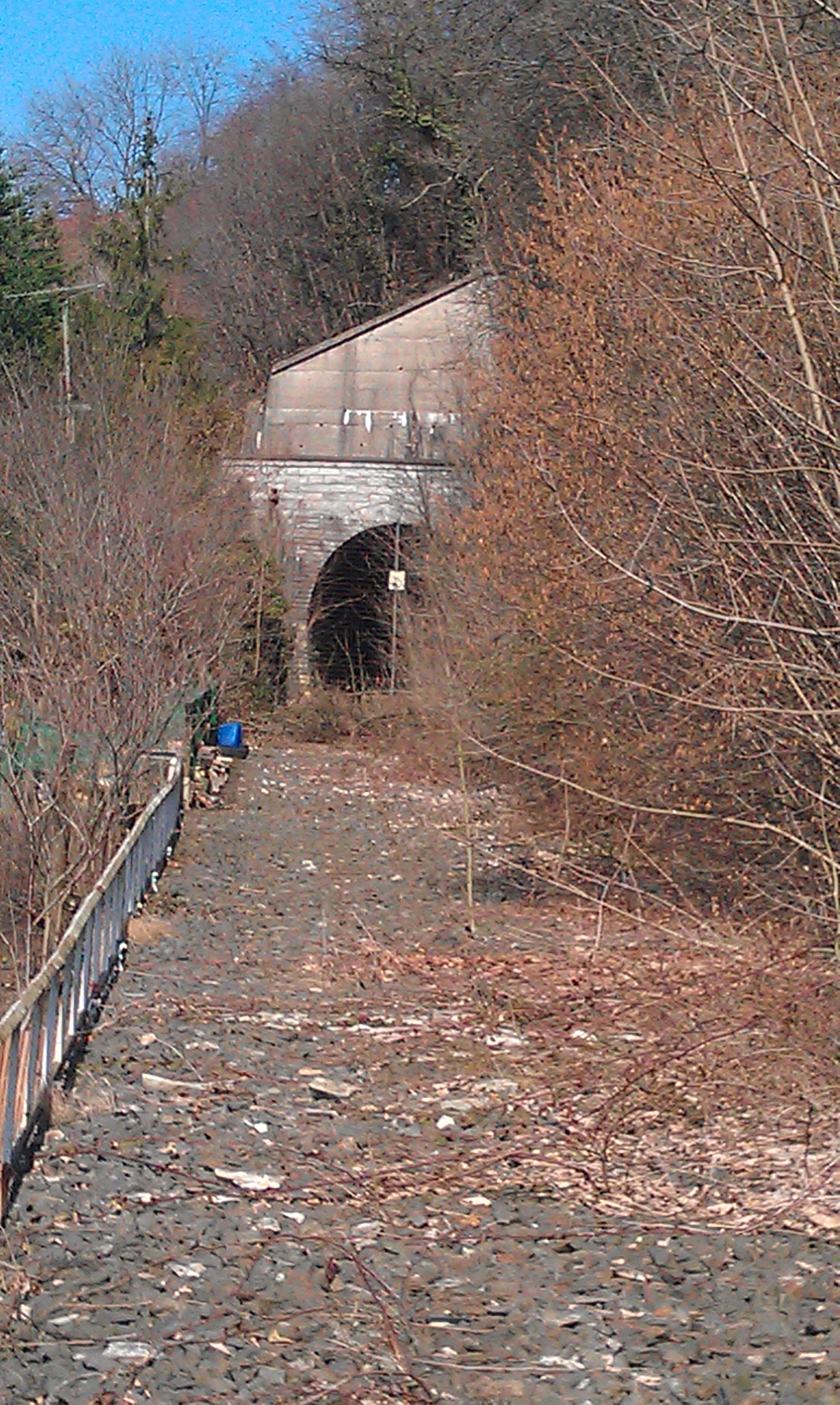
Vicinity of the south portal of the Ahden Tunnel with a length of 118 m

Regular passenger service between Büren and Brilon was closed on the section on 29 September 1974 due to superstructure defects. The Heckeneilzug service continued for some years from Brilon Wald via Warburg towards north Germany. On 30 May 1981, the remaining passenger services on the line were finally closed. There were still regular passenger services on the sections between Paderborn and Büren and Brilon Stadt and Brilon Wald.

The freight traffic had already been partially closed on 30 May 1965 between Büren and Ringelstein. Freight traffic ended between Ringelstein and Alme on 14 April 1975. Freight traffic ran to Alme until 31 July 1991 and to Thülen until 30 May 1992. North of Büren, the line was still in use for freight until the end of 1995, but it was then closed. The 10-km stretch between Brilon Wald and the Egger company in Brilon is still regularly used for freight transport and since the timetable change in December 2011 and the line between Brilon Wald and Brilon Stadt is again used for passenger services. The line between Brilon Egger and Büren-Weinberg, which is now used by the RWE company for the transport of transformers to the Brilon substation, has been sold and continues to be operated as a branch line.

=== Attempted revival of the northern section ===
In 1999, the Westphalian Almetalbahn GmbH (WAB) took over the Paderborn–Büren section in an attempt to revive the freight traffic and operate excursions with a historic steam train. However, it was only used for individual freight operations and steam excursions. This section of the line was closed on 30 June 2006 as remediation work was necessary and it was dismantled shortly afterwards.

== Current condition ==
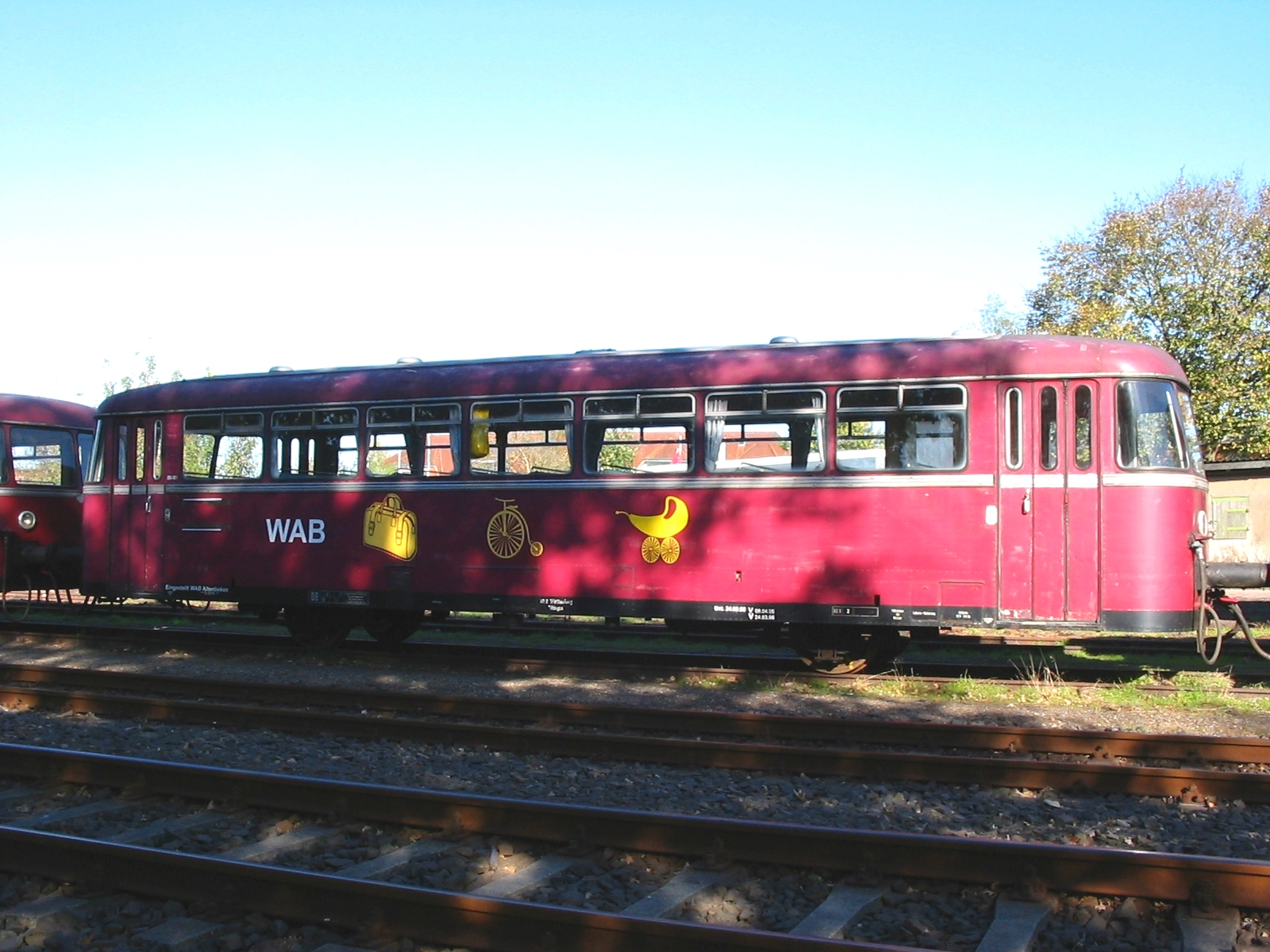
Former railbus of the Westfälischen Almetalbahn e. V. for reuse on a siding in Hagenow, October 2007

=== Northern section ===
The line is run down between Paderborn and Büren-Weinberg, but it has not been closed, and there were considerations of using it for a connection to Paderborn Lippstadt Airport. In 2011, the Nahverkehrsverbund (local transport association) Paderborn-Höxter decided not to proceed with this on cost grounds.

=== Southern section ===
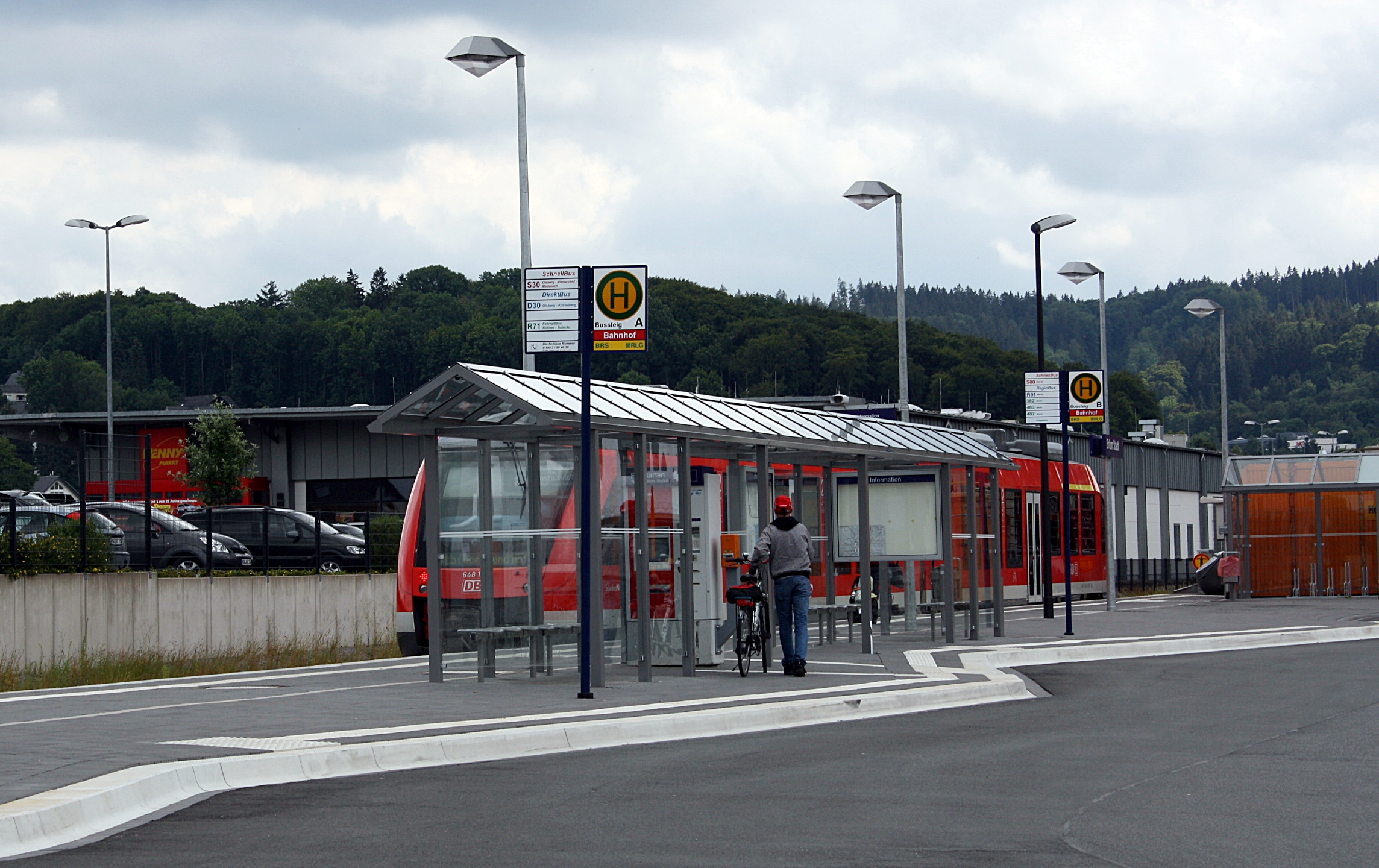
The Brilon Stadt station 2012

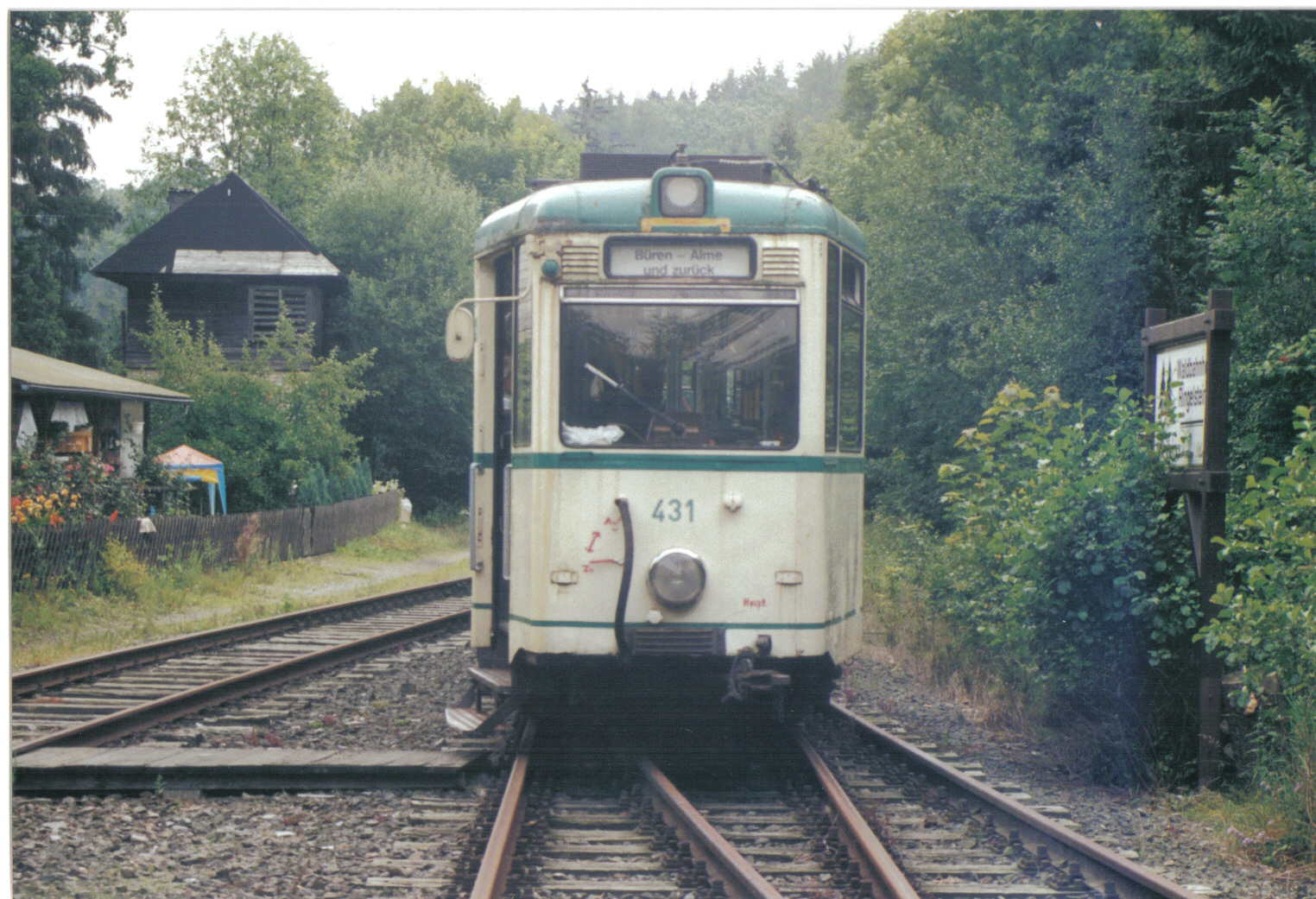
Museum tram 431 near Ringelstein in August 2000

The Büren-Weiberg–Thülen section was used in the summer months from 1981 for the operations of museum trains. This was operated by Dortmund railway enthusiasts as the Westfälische Almetalbahn e. V. (WAB), using an old Dortmund GT4 431 tram together with a generator wagon. In 2001, the tram set was replaced by railcars. The association, however, ceased operations on the line several years ago, when the Waldbahn Almetal e. V. took over heritage railway operations on the lower Alme Valley Railway. It operates two Uerdingen railbuses of class 798. The tram is now in the Mooskamp Tram Museum (Nahverkehrsmuseum Dortmund) in Dortmund-Nette.

DB Schenker Rail Germany and the Westfälische Landes-Eisenbahn (WLE) operate freight for the Egger company on the section from Brilon Wald via Brilon Stadt to Brilon Egger. The section between Thülen and Büren, which is leased to RWE AG, is used for the transport of transformers between Buren and the Nehden substation.

In 2007, the track between Brilon Wald and Brilon Egger was restored because the Egger company had to increase its operations and rehabilitation of the line was a condition for expanding its site in Brilon.

In 2008, platform tracks 1 and 4–8 in Brilon Stadt station were demolished and the Brilon Arkaden shopping centre was built on the former railway land. Brilon Stadt now retained only two tracks and these were required for freight. Because of the lack of platforms, the museum trains have operated only as far as Thülen since 2008.

Since 11 December 2011, Regionalbahn services have extended beyond Brilon Wald to Brilon Stadt again. Its realisation has previously been postponed several times, but at the end of 2008 the Ministry for Construction and Transport of North Rhine-Westphalia agreed to add Brilon Stadt station to its infrastructure financing plan on condition that the Zweckverband SPNV Ruhr-Lippe (association for rail passenger transport of Ruhr-Lippe, ZRL) also funded the line from Brilon Wald to Brilon Stadt. The ZRL decided on 23 June 2009 to resume scheduled regional services on this section from the timetable change of December 2011. A central bus station was also established in Brilon Stadt.

A passenger train ran again on the section between Brilon Stadt and Brilon Stadt for the first time in over 30 years on 10 December 2011. Since then, through trains have run to and from Dortmund from Monday to Friday. On Saturdays, Sundays and public holidays trains run to and from Bestwig and Korbach.
