= Brilon Stadt station =

Railway station in Brilon, Germany

Brilon Stadt
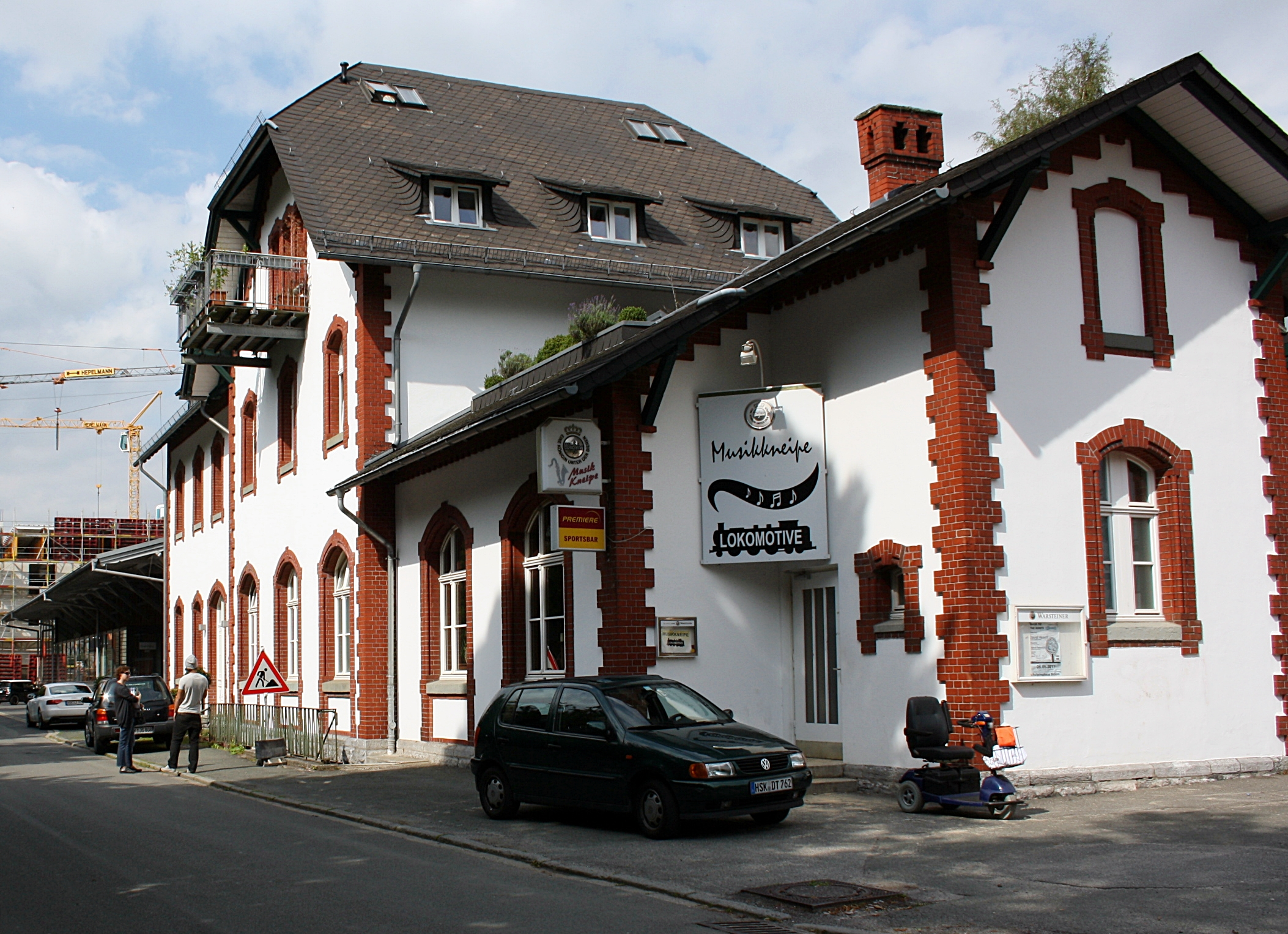
- Old station building

General information
- Location: Bahnhofstraße, Brilon, North Rhine-Westphalia; Germany
- Coordinates: 51°23′55″N 8°34′31″E
- System: Through station
- Owner: Deutsche Bahn
- Operator: DB Netz; DB Station&Service
- Lines: Alme Valley Railway (52.4 km) (KBS 435); Möhne Valley Railway (54.2 km) (closed)
- Platforms: 1

Construction
- Accessible: Yes

Other information
- Station code: 8251
- DS100 code: EBRS
- IBNR: 8001182
- Category: 7
- Fare zone: Westfalentarif: 44781
- Website: www.bahnhof.de

History
- Opened: 1 July 1900

Services
Preceding station	DB Regio NRW	Following station
Terminus	RE 57	Brilon Wald towards Dortmund Hbf
Preceding station	Kurhessenbahn	Following station
Terminus	RB 97	Brilon Wald towards Marburg (Lahn)
Location
- Location within North Rhine-Westphalia

Brilon Stadt (town) station is one of four passenger stations that are still in service in the town of Brilon in the German state of North Rhine-Westphalia. It is located near the centre of Brilon. The former goods shed of the station is a listed building.

== History ==
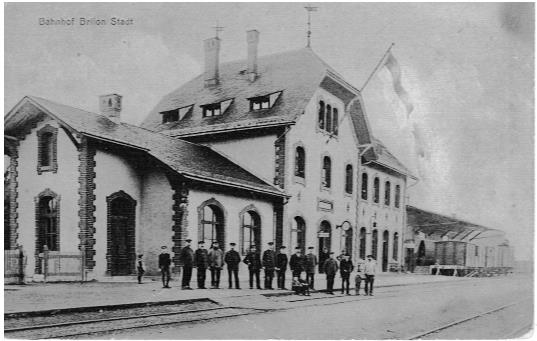
The station before 1918

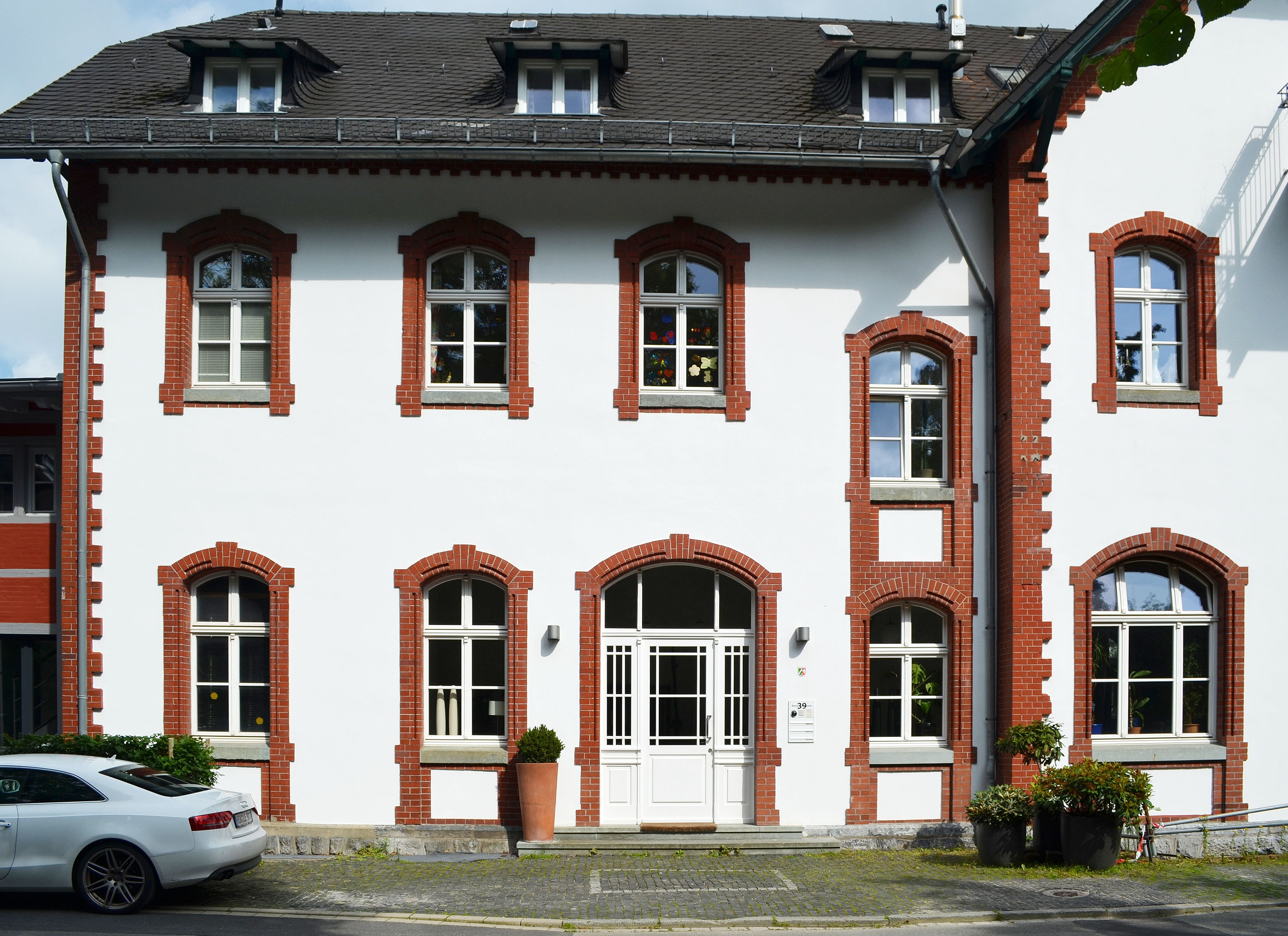
The left half of the former station building (2012)

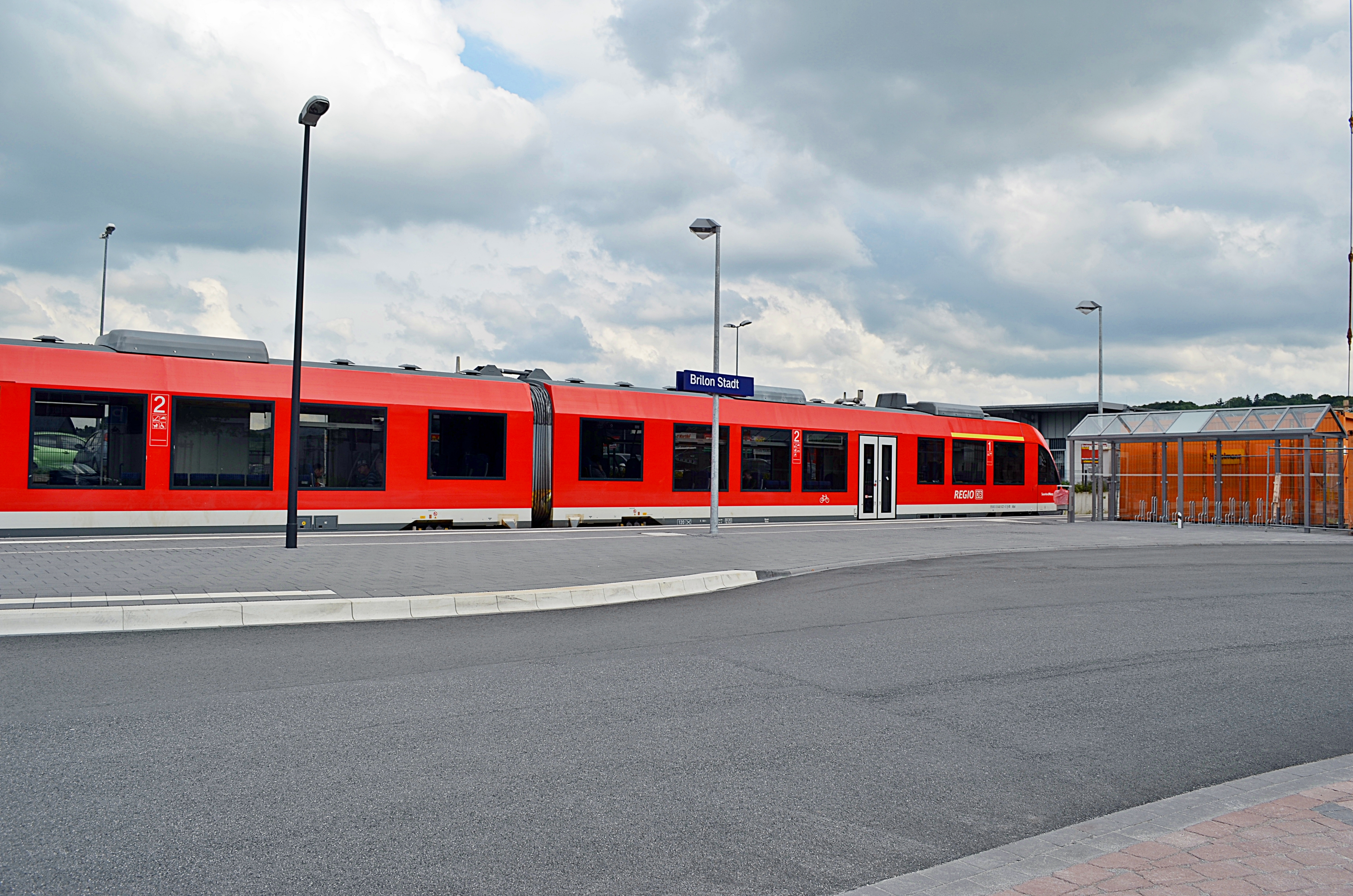
The station in 2012. On the right is the covered bicycle parking and the front of the bus station

Brilon Stadt station was opened by the Westfälische Landes-Eisenbahn (Westphalian Provincial Railway, WLE) on 1 December 1898 with the first section of the Möhne Valley Railway from Belecke to Brilon. Exactly one year later, it was extended from Belecke to Soest.

The section of the Alme Valley Railway from Büren to Brilon Wald was opened on 1 April 1901. This made Brilon Stadt station into a railway junction.

The regularly scheduled passenger services on the Möhne Valley Railway between Belecke and Brilon ended on 26 September 1958. Freight traffic between Brilon and Heidberg ended on 28 February 1979. The tracks were dismantled in the following year.

Passenger services on the route from Brilon Wald via Brilon Stadt, Thülen, Alme and Büren to Paderborn ended on 29 September 1974. The freight traffic between Brilon Stadt and the Egger company in Brilon has continued and is still operated regularly today.

Museum train services have operated in the summer months on the Brilon Stadt–Büren (Westf)–Weinberg section since 1981. The museum trains have operated only to and from Thülen since 2008 because of the absence of a platform in Brilon Stadt.

In 2007, the line between Brilon Wald and Brilon Egger was restored because the Egger company had to increase its operations and rehabilitation of the line was a condition for expanding its site in Brilon.

In 2008, platform tracks 1 and 4–8 in Brilon Stadt station were demolished and the Brilon Arkaden shopping centre was built on the former railway land. Brilon Stadt now retained only two tracks and these were required for freight.

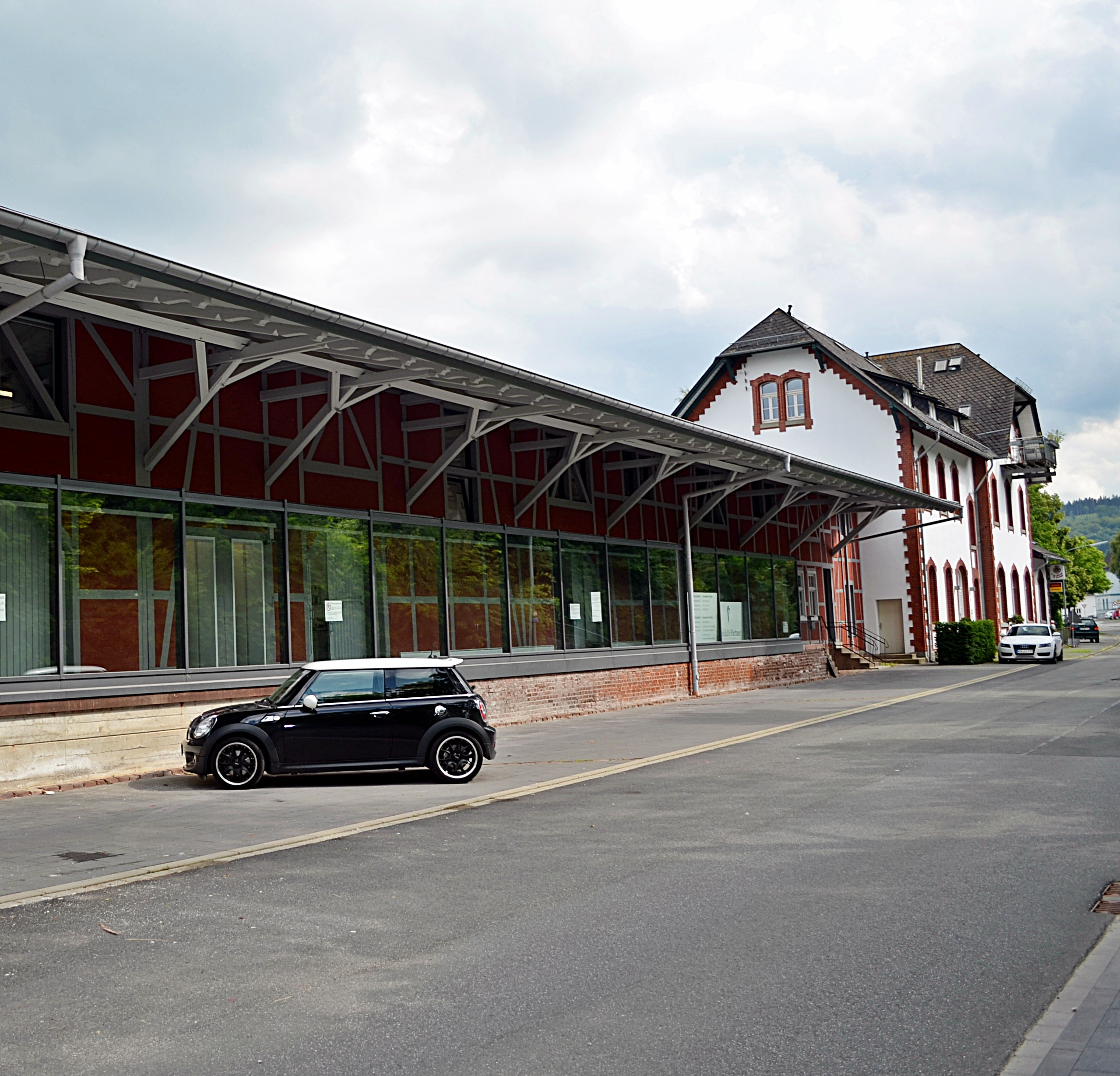
The former goods shed in 2012, the station building is in the background

From the timetable change of 2011/2012 on 11 December 2011, regional passenger services were extended beyond Brilon Wald to Brilon Stadt again. Its realisation has previously been postponed several times, but at the end of 2008 the Ministry for Construction and Transport of North Rhine-Westphalia agreed to add Brilon Stadt station to its infrastructure financing plan on condition that the Zweckverband SPNV Ruhr-Lippe (association for rail passenger transport of Ruhr-Lippe, ZRL) also funded the line from Brilon Wald to Brilon Stadt. The ZRL decided on 23 June 2009 to resume scheduled regional services on this section from the timetable change of December 2011.

A passenger train ran again on the section between Brilon Wald and Brilon Stadt for the first time in over 30 years on 10 December 2011. Since then, through trains have run to and from Dortmund from Monday to Friday. On Saturdays, Sundays and public holidays trains run to and from Bestwig and Korbach.

== Infrastructure ==
Until its closure in 2008, Brilon Stadt station had extensive trackage. All that is left of the once extensive trackage is one platform track (track 2) and one track without a platform (track 3) on which freight trains can be parked.

A platform that is accessible by the disabled was built for the reactivation of Brilon Stadt station. At the same time a new central bus station was built.

== Services ==
Brilon Stadt station is owned by the Verkehrsgemeinschaft Ruhr-Lippe (Transport Community Ruhr-Lippe, VRL). Rail services are regulated by the Zweckverband SPNV Ruhr-Lippe (association for rail passenger transport of Ruhr-Lippe, ZRL).

=== Passengers ===
DB Regio NRW has operated services on the line from Brilon Wald to Brilon Stadt again since 11 December 2011. Brilon has since been served by two lines:

- The Dortmund-Sauerland-Express (RE 57, KBS 435) runs from Dortmund Hbf—partly via Hagen Hbf—to Bestwig, where it is divided with one part continuing to Winterberg and the other part running to Brilon Wald and Brilon Stadt. On Friday and on the weekend some of the sections running to Willingen continue to Korbach. Often, however, the trains only begin in Bestwig and run from there to Brilon Stadt or Willingen. On weekends services run every two hours to Brilon Stadt.
  - Since the express runs only from Monday to Friday in the morning and afternoon or evening, there are (sometimes even on weekends) additional trains from Brilon Stadt to Brilon Wald. These are then coupled with the Dortmund-Sauerland-Express each hour.
- The Kurhessenbahn operates the Lahn-Sauerland-Express (RE/RB 97, KBS 439) service on the Wega–Brilon Wald railway from Brilon Wald to Willingen, Korbach, Frankenberg and Marburg at one or two hour intervals.

Line	Route	Frequency
RE 57 Dortmund-Sauerland-Express	(Dortmund Hbf – Arnsberg (Westf) –) Bestwig – Brilon Wald – Brilon Stadt / Willingen (– Korbach)	Every 2 hours
RE 97/RB 97 Lahn-Sauerland-Express	Brilon Stadt – Brilon Wald – Willingen – Korbach – Frankenberg – Cölbe – Marburg	Every 1 or 2 hours

The running time from/to Korbach trains is usually about an hour. The travelling time from Brilon Wald to Brilon Stadt is about eight minutes.

=== Freight ===
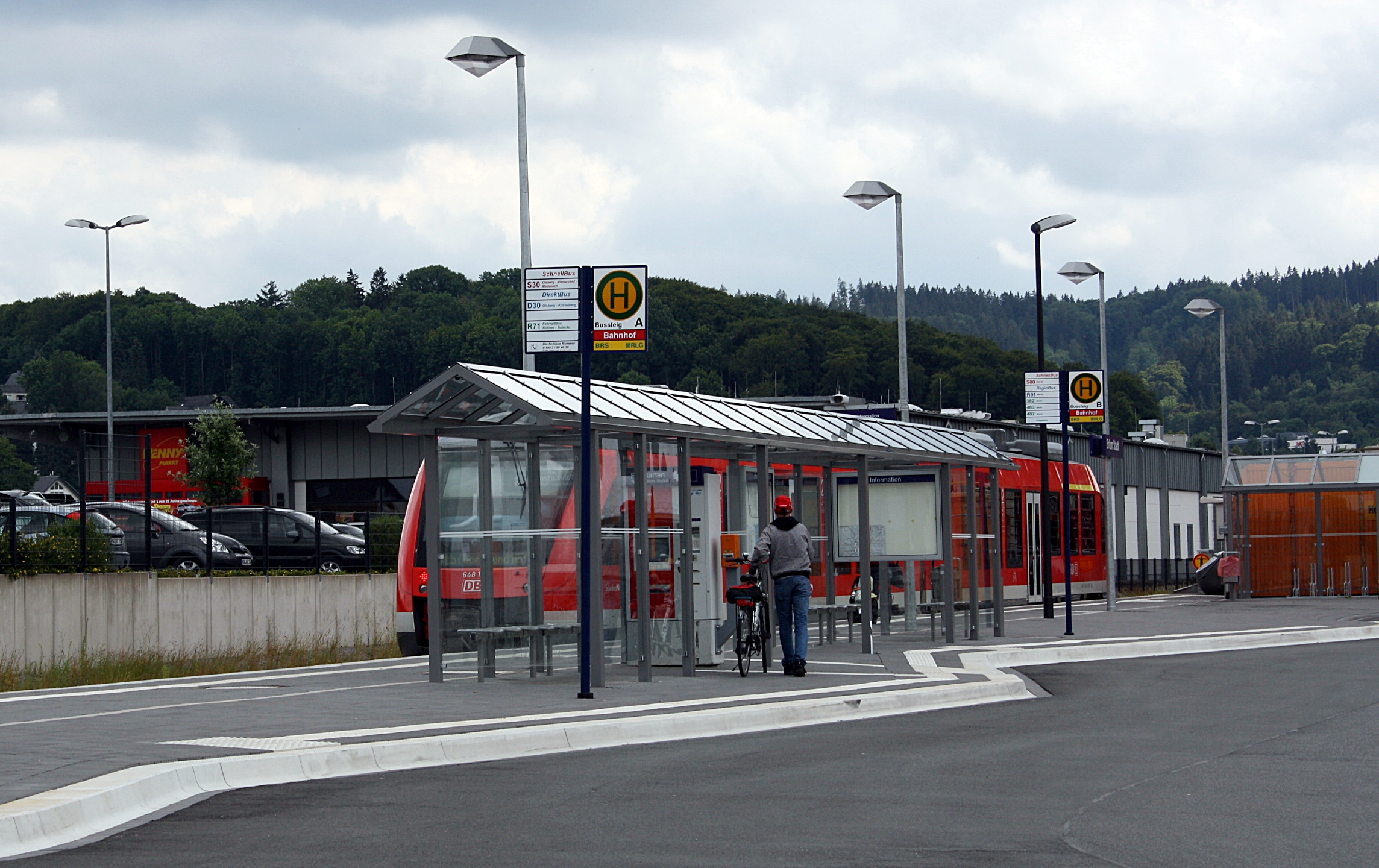
The station in 2012

DB Schenker Rail Germany and the Westfälische Landes-Eisenbahn (WLE) operate freight for the Egger company on the 10 km long section from Brilon Wald via Brilon Stadt to Brilon Egger.

=== Buses ===
Buses of the Regionalverkehr Ruhr-Lippe GmbH (RLG), a subsidiary of Westfälische Verkehrsgesellschaft (WVG) and Busverkehr Ruhr-Sieg GmbH (BRS), a subsidiary of WB Westfalen Bus GmbH (itself owned by Deutsche Bahn), began to run from the newly built central bus station in December 2011.
