= Neerdar (Wilde Aa) =

River in Germany

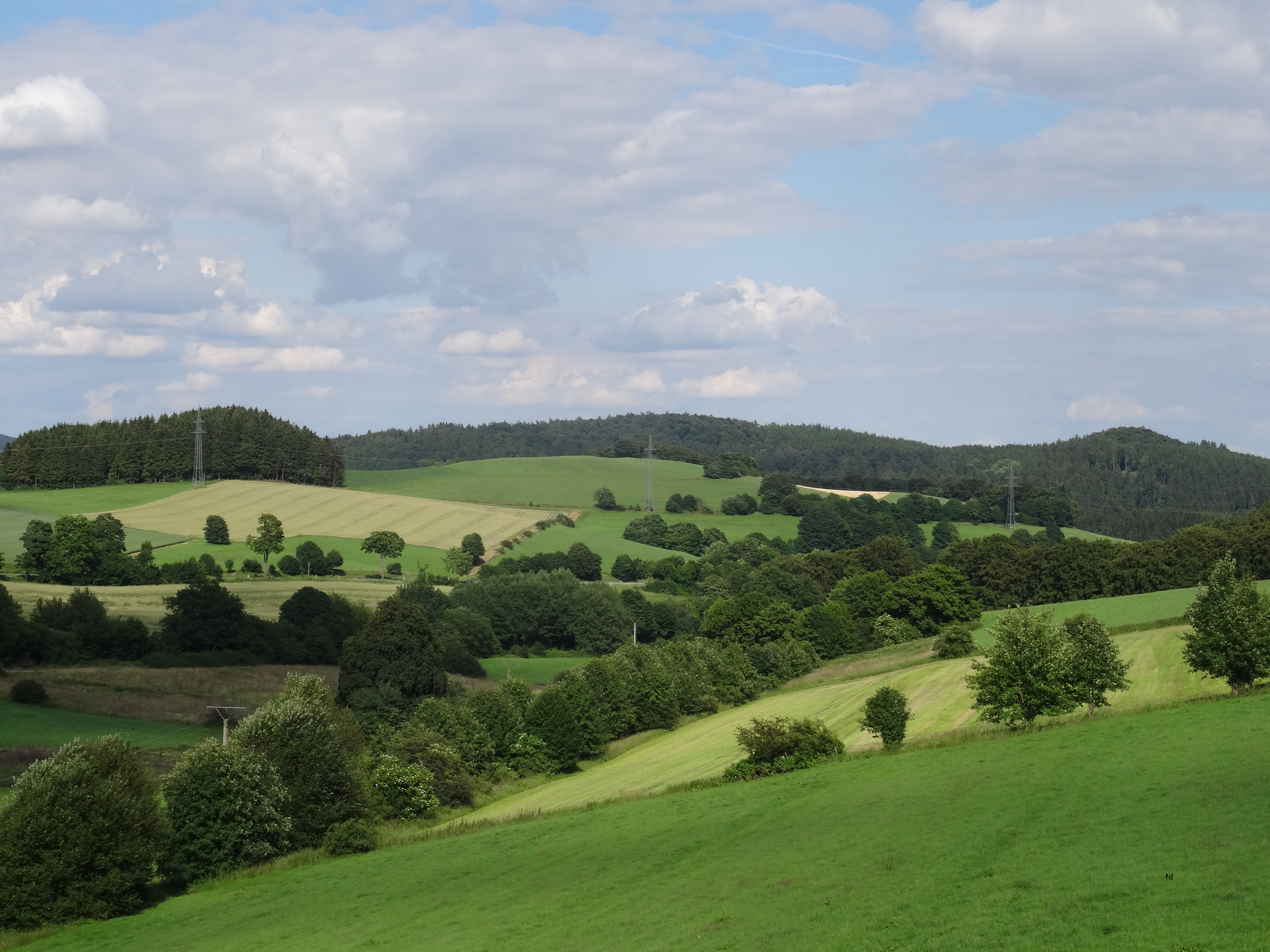

- Location within Germany

Location
- Country: Germany
- States: North Rhine-Westphalia; Hesse

Physical characteristics
- Mouth
  - location: Wilde Aa
  - coordinates: 51.2516°N 8.7677°E
- Length: 14.6 km (9.1 mi)

Basin features
- Progression: Wilde Aa→ Orke→ Eder→ Fulda→ Weser→ North Sea

Neerdar is a river of North Rhine-Westphalia and of Hesse, Germany. It is a left tributary of the Wilde Aa near Korbach.

== See also ==
- List of rivers of Hesse
- List of rivers of North Rhine-Westphalia
