= Wilde Aa =

River in Germany

Location
- Country: Germany
- States: North Rhine-Westphalia; Hesse

Physical characteristics
- Mouth
  - location: Orke
  - coordinates: 51°09′12″N 8°46′28″E
- Length: 27.1 km (16.8 mi)

Basin features
- Progression: Orke→ Eder→ Fulda→ Weser→ North Sea

Wilde Aa (in its lower course also: Aar) is a river of North Rhine-Westphalia and Hesse, Germany. It flows into the Orke near Lichtenfels.

== See also ==
- List of rivers of Hesse
- List of rivers of North Rhine-Westphalia
