= Orke =

River in Germany

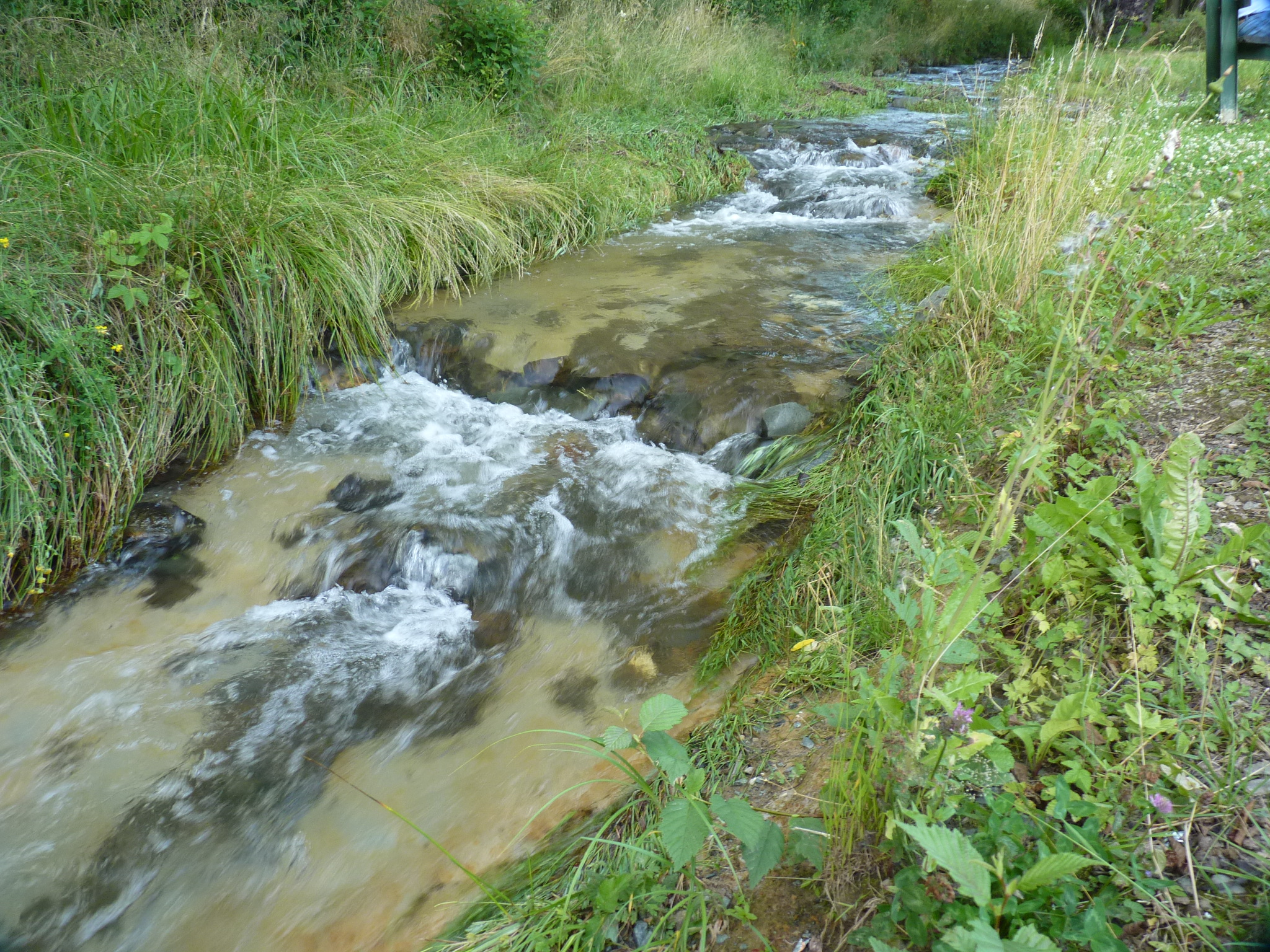
- Orke near town Elkeringhausen

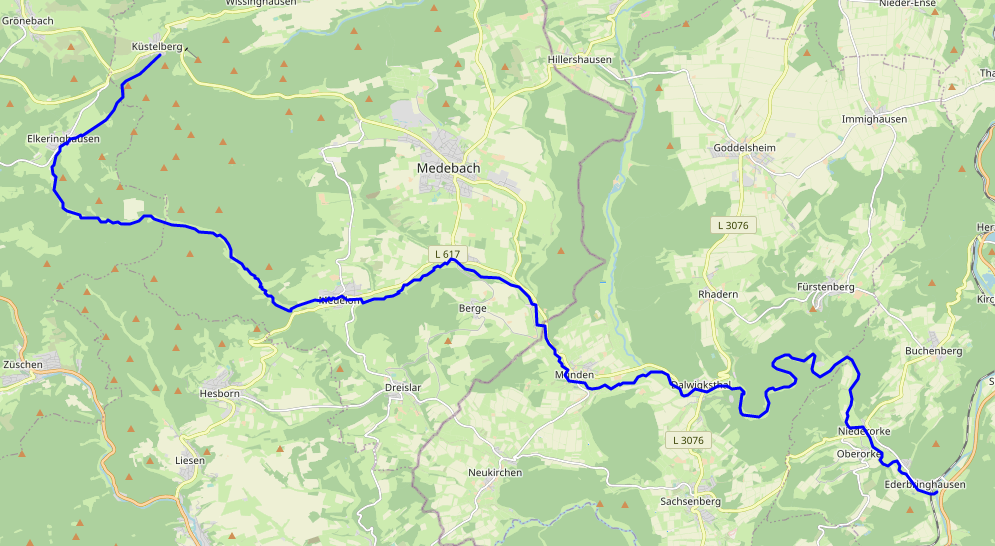

Location
- Country: Germany
- States: North Rhine-Westphalia and Hesse

Physical characteristics
- Source
  - location: Near Küstelberg
  - coordinates: 51°13′18″N 8°30′20″E
  - elevation: 645 m (2,116 ft)
- Mouth
  - location: Eder at Ederbringhausen
  - coordinates: 51°7′39″N 8°52′18″E
  - elevation: 256 m (840 ft)
- Length: 38.2 km (23.7 mi)
- Basin size: 279.1 km^{2} (107.8 sq mi)

Basin features
- Progression: Eder→ Fulda→ Weser→ North Sea
- Tributaries
  - left: Medebach, Wilde Aa, etc.
  - right: Helle, Schwelgersbach, etc.

Orke (German pronunciation: [ˈɔʁkə]) is a river of North Rhine-Westphalia and of Hesse, Germany. It flows into the Eder in Ederbringhausen, Hesse.

== See also ==
- List of rivers of North Rhine-Westphalia
- List of rivers of Hesse
