= Usingen station =

Railway station in Usingen, Germany

Usingen
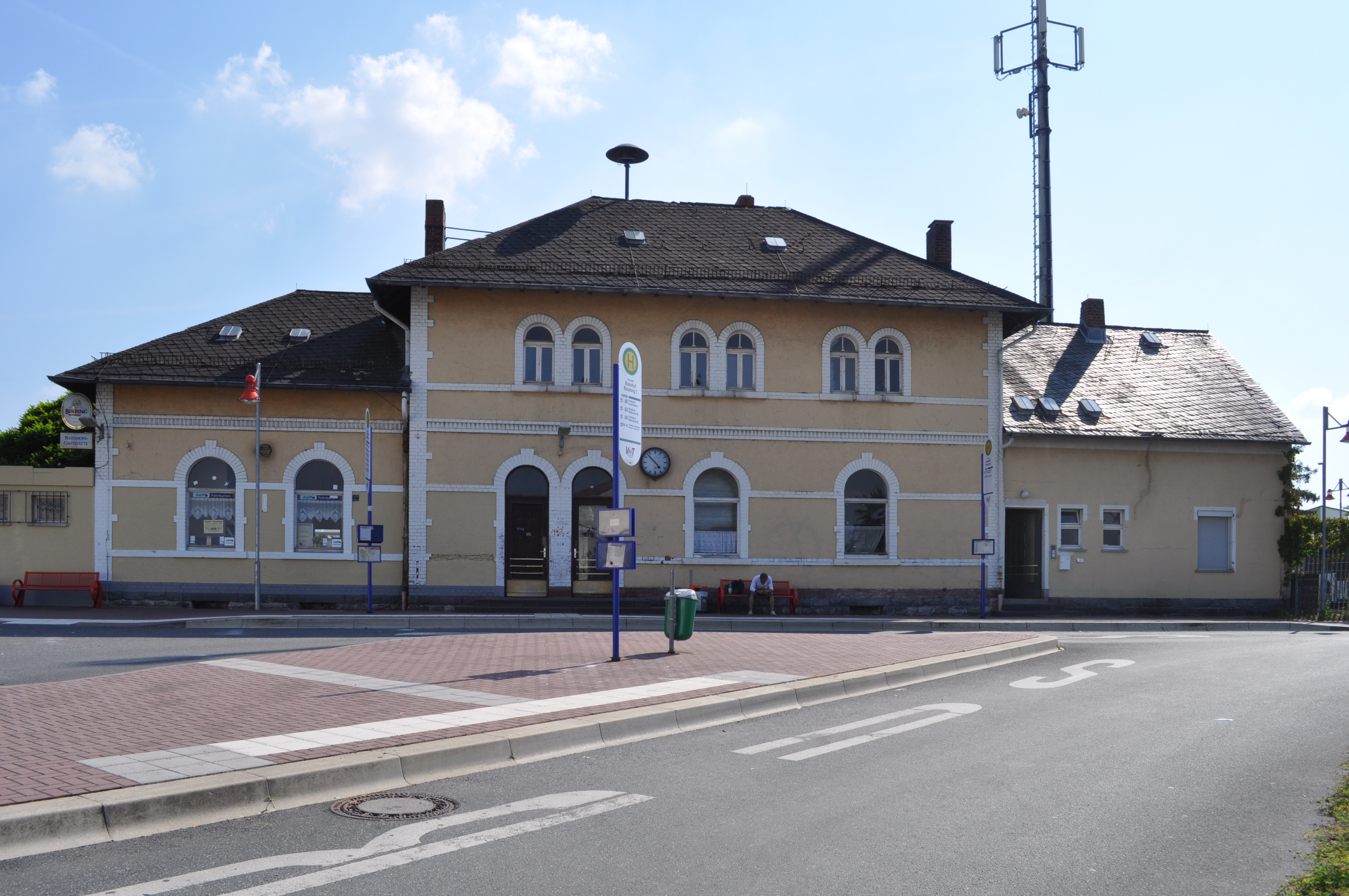
- Entrance building

General information
- Location: Bahnhofstraße 32, Usingen, Hesse; Germany
- Coordinates: 50°19′51″N 8°31′40″E
- System: Through station
- Lines: Taunus Railway (km 17.7) (KBS 637)
- Platforms: 2

Other information
- Station code: n/a
- DS100 code: FUSI
- IBNR: 8007852
- Fare zone: : 5206

History
- Opened: 15 October 1895
Location
- Location within Hesse

Usingen station is the station of Usingen in the German state of Hesse) and the operations centre of the Taunus Railway from Brandoberndorf via Grävenwiesbach and Usingen to Bad Homburg. The entrance building is heritage-listed.

== History ==
On 15 October 1895, the Usingen Railway (Usinger Bahn), the section of the current Taunus Railway (Taunusbahn) from Bad Homburg to Usingen, was opened as an extension of the Homburg Railway from Frankfurt to Bad Homburg, which had been operated since 1860. This connected Usingen to the rail network.

Usingen was the terminus for trains from Bad Homburg until 1 June 1909. The Usingen Railway was then extended via Grävenwiesbach to Weilmünster and Usingen station became a through station. For topographical reasons a zig zag had to be installed in Grävenwiesbach to continue the line to Weilmünster and later to Weilburg.

The Solmsbach Valley Railway (Solmsbachtalbahn) was opened from Grävenwiesbach to Albshausen on 1 November 1912 as an extension of the Usingen Railway and later extended to Wetzlar.

After planning in 2005, the island platform at Usingen station was extended in the autumn of 2006 to accommodate trains consisting of four Linke-Hofmann-Busch VT 2E two-car railcars or three LINT 41 sets. In November 2007, two additional platform displays were installed on the platform. Freight traffic to and from Usingen was abandoned on 6 November 2000.

== Station precincts ==
=== Entrance building ===
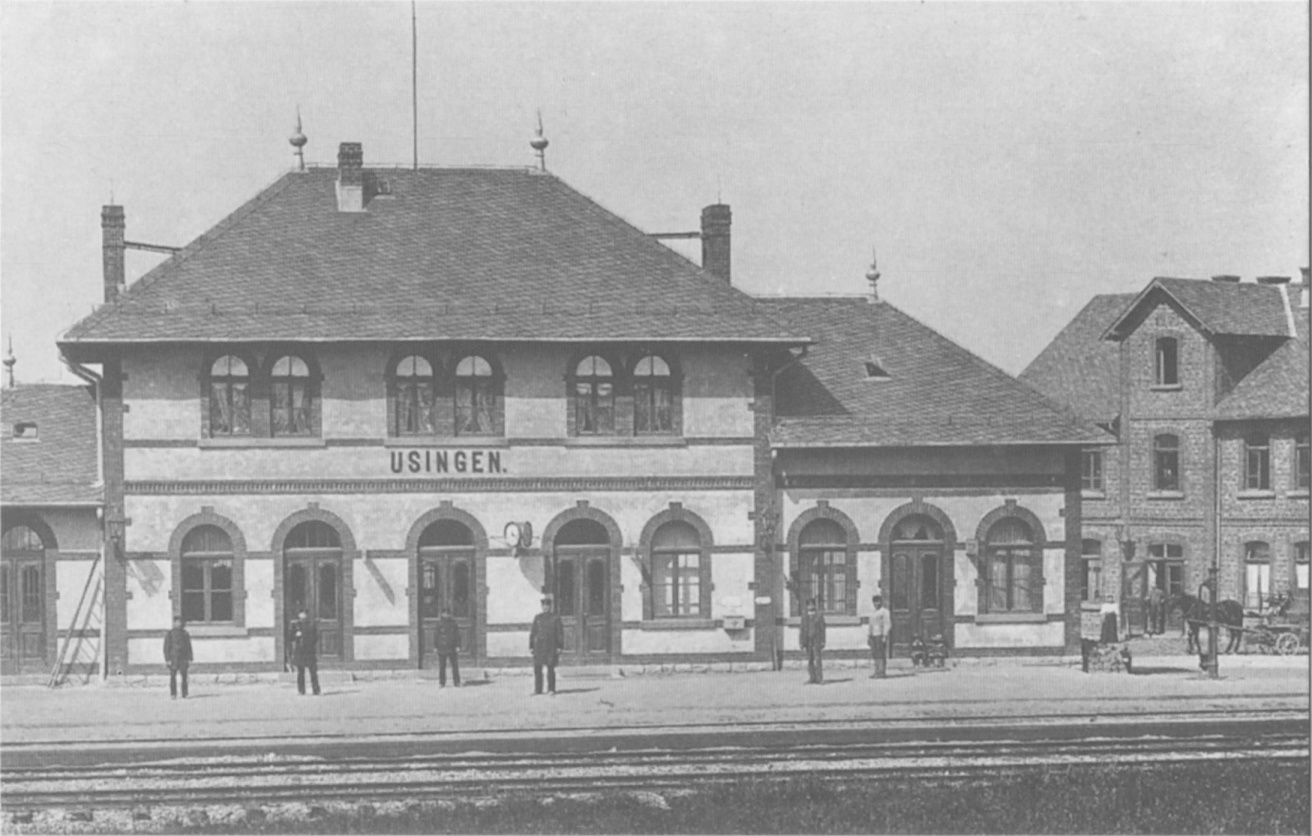
Entrance building in about 1900

The entrance building of Usingen station is now heritage-listed under Hessian law. The renovated station houses a branch of a bakery and a ticket office. The station's address is Bahnhofstraße 32.

The entrance building consists of a two-storey main building to which a slightly recessed single-storey annex is attached. The arched openings and hip roofs are striking. The vertical lines of the building are emphasised by lesenes in the corners. It is built in the style of Friedrichsdorf station.

There was originally another extension and a goods hall on the north side. This hall was destroyed in a fire.

=== Other infrastructure ===
The central signal box of the Taunus Railway is located in Usingen. Trains are stored, assembled, disassembled and refueled on the four platformless tracks.

This was formerly the location of the loading station of the 4 km-long narrow-gauge railway to a geyserite works (now Bremthaler Quarzitwerk) and a siding from Raiffeisen Waren-Zentrale Rhein-Main (an agricultural cooperative).

The section with the steepest grade (up to 2.147%) begins here. Wilhelmsdorf station, which is at the end of it, is 390 metres above sea level.

== Services ==
=== Rail ===
Usingen station is the Taunus Railway's centre of operations and is in the area where fares are set by the Rhein-Main-Verkehrsverbund (Rhine-Main Transport Association, RMV). Services are operated by the HLB Basis AG.

Usingen station has two tracks adjoining an island platform. The trains of the Taunus Railway (RMV line 15) can use either track to run to Brandoberndorf via Grävenwiesbach or to Bad Homburg via Neu-Anspach, Wehrheim and Friedrichsdorf. Services to Brandoberndorf generally use track 1, while the services to Bad Homburg generally use track 2. Usually, trains also cross here. Individual services begin or end in Usingen.

The Taunus Railway operates every half hour on weekdays from Grävenwiesbach to Bad Homburg; in addition, additional services run in the mornings and evenings in the peak hour, which operate to/from Frankfurt (Main) Hauptbahnhof and for operational reasons mainly run as RMV line 12 to/from Königstein. On Saturday there is—apart from a break in the morning—a half-hourly service between Grävenwiesbach and Bad Homburg until about 16:00; afterwards and on Sundays, services run hourly on the whole line. The timetable is designed so that there is always a connection to S-Bahn line S5 to/from Frankfurt.

=== Bus ===
On the opposite side of the entrance building is a bus station, formed of platforms 1–3. The local bus routes 59, 60, 62, 63, 64, 65, 66, 67, 82 and FB-35 leave from there and connect Usingen station with the towns and villages of the Hochtaunuskreis and the town of Bad Nauheim in Wetteraukreis (route FB-35). A late service on bus route 59, which runs from Grävenwiesbach via Usingen to Friedrichsdorf, where there is connection to the S5 service to Frankfurt, complements the evening rail services.

== Prospects ==
It is currently proposed to electrify and upgrade the Taunus Railway by the end of 2022 to enable the extension of S-Bahn line S5 from Friedrichsdorf to Usingen.
