= Grävenwiesbach station =

Railway station in Grävenwiesbach, Germany

Grävenwiesbach
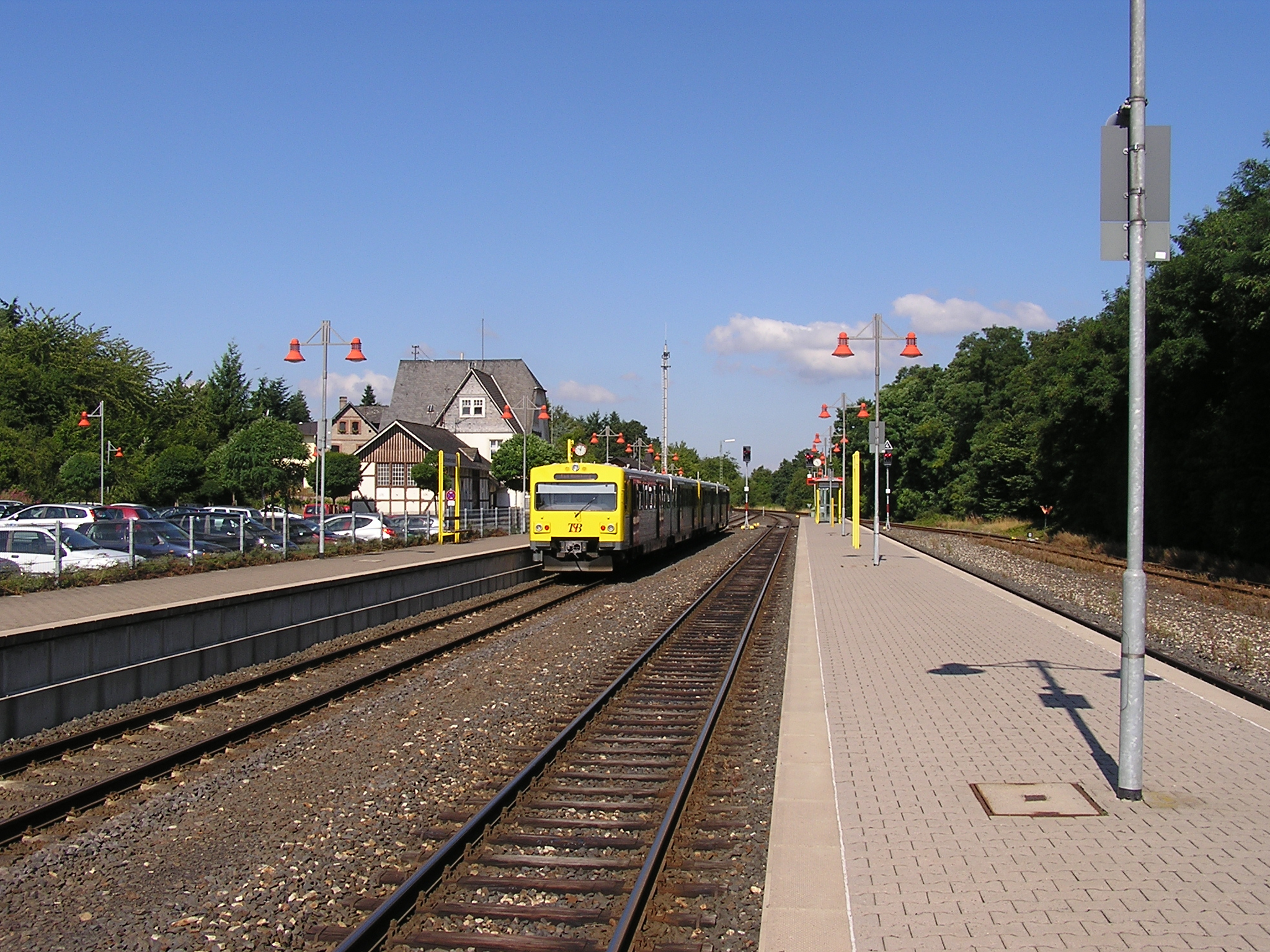
- Entrance building and platforms

General information
- Location: Grävenwiesbach, Hesse; Germany
- Coordinates: 50°22′56″N 8°27′30″E
- System: Through station
- Lines: Solmsbach Valley Railway (km 28.84) (closed); Taunus Railway (km 28.8) (KBS 637); Weil Valley Railway (km 22.1) (closed)
- Platforms: 3

Construction
- Architect: Eduard Goepfert

Other information
- Station code: n/a
- DS100 code: FGR
- IBNR: 8000132
- Fare zone: : 5216

History
- Opened: 15 October 1895
Location
- Location within Hesse

Grävenwiesbach station is the station of Grävenwiesbach on the edge of the Hochtaunuskreis in the German state of Hesse. It is located on the southern outskirts of the town centre. Previously, the station was a junction station that served trains running on the Weil Valley Railway to Weilburg via Weilmünster, on the Taunus Railway to Bad Homburg and on the Solms Valley Railway to Wetzlar.

== History ==
Grävenwiesbach station was opened on 1 June 1909 with the opening of the extension of the Usingen Railway from Usingen to Weilmünster, which connected with the Weil Valley Railway. Due to the typography of the line, it was built as a dead-end station with trains reversing to continue their journeys.

The Prussian state railways (Preußische Staatseisenbahnen) began planning a branch line through the Solmsbach valley to Wetzlar. The Solmsbach Valley Railway could not be opened between Grävenwiesbach and Albshausen (on the Lahn Valley Railway) until 1 November 1912, because several substantial structures had to be built first. Thus Grävenwiesbach became a junction station and the line to Weilmünster became part of the Weil Valley Railway.

Due to insufficient passenger volumes, the operation of passenger and freight traffic on the Weil Valley Railway was discontinued on 27 September 1969. There was still a 100 m long piece of the former line to Weilburg, which served as a headshunt, until the 1980s.

Passenger traffic ended on the Solmsbach Valley Railway on 31 May 1985 and freight traffic ended on 28 May 1988.

On 15 November 1999, the Grävenwiesbach–Brandoberndorf section of the Solmsbach Valley Railway was reactivated for passenger traffic and the section became part of the Taunus Railway.

== Station entrance building and freight hall ==
The entrance building was built from 1909 to 1912 to designs by Eduard Goepfert. It is heritage-listed along with the attached goods hall. The station entrance building is built in the style of a country house in various materials. The building has a visible framework and is covered with slate.

== Services ==
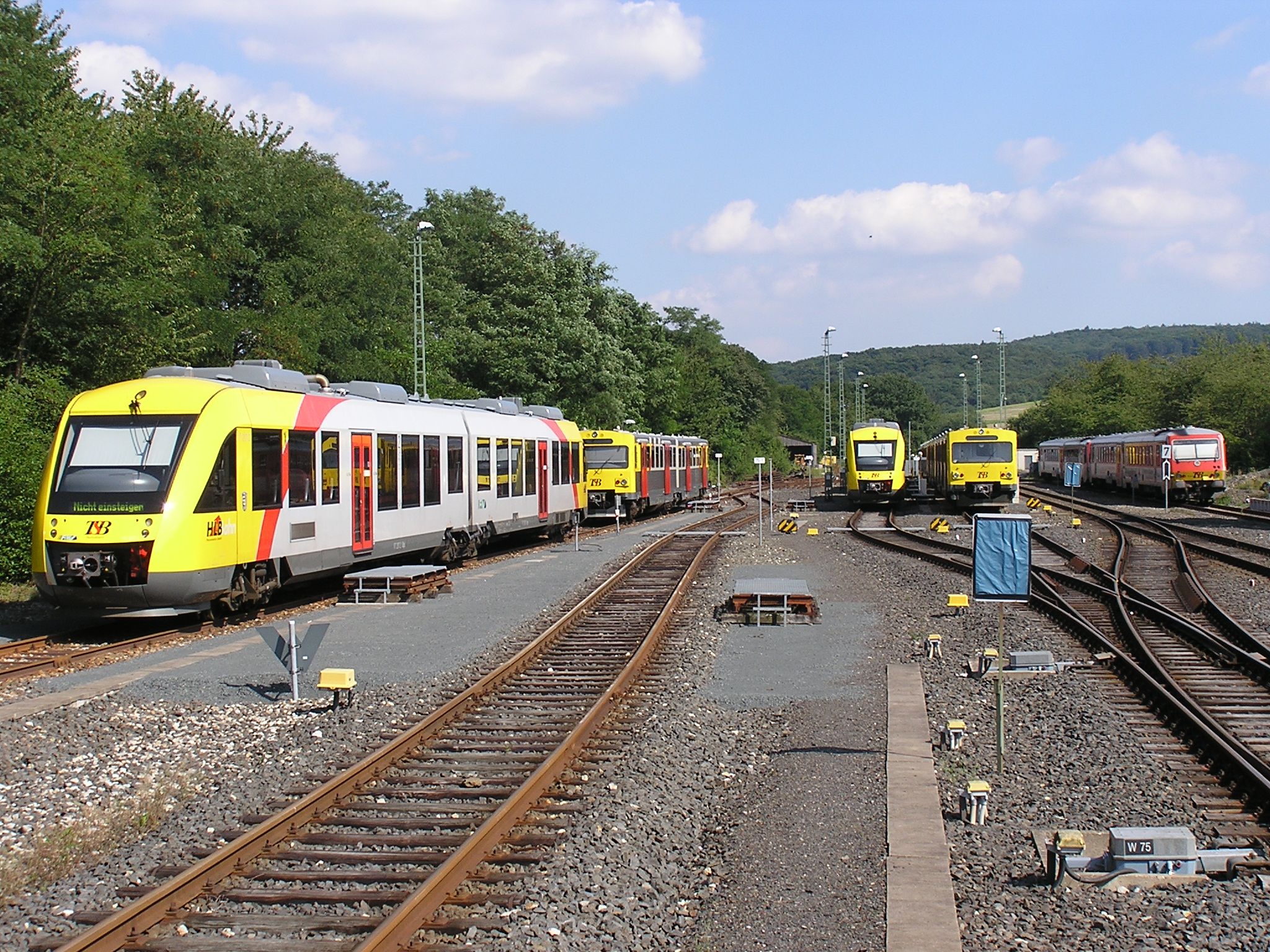
Sidings

=== Rail ===
Grävenwiesbach station is in the area where fares are set by the Rhein-Main-Verkehrsverbund (Rhine-Main Transport Association, RMV). Services are operated by HLB Basis AG.

Grävenwiesbach station has three platform tracks. The Taunus Railway (RMV line 15) can run on all three tracks trains to Brandoberndorf or to Bad Homburg via Neu-Anspach, Wehrheim and Friedrichsdorf.

The Taunus Railway operates every half hour on weekdays from Grävenwiesbach to Bad Homburg; additional services run in the mornings and evenings in the peak hour, which operate to/from Frankfurt (Main) Hauptbahnhof and for operational reasons mainly continue as RMV line 12 to/from Königstein. On Saturday there is, apart from a break in the morning, a half-hourly service between Grävenwiesbach and Bad Homburg until about 16:00; afterwards and on Sundays, services run hourly on the whole line. The timetable is designed so that there is always a connection to S-Bahn line S5 to/from Frankfurt.

=== Bus ===
Regional bus routes 50, 59, 68, 81 and 289 run from Grävenwiesbach station. Bus route 289 runs as a replacement for the Weil Valley Railway to the Lahn valley. Bus line 50 connects Grävenwiesbach via Weilrod and Schmitten with Oberursel and Bad Homburg vor der Höhe through the upper Weil valley. A late service on bus route 59, which runs from Grävenwiesbach via Usingen to Friedrichsdorf, where there is connection to the S5 service to Frankfurt, complements the evening rail services.

== Former planning ==
When the Grävenwiesbach–Brandoberndorf section of the Solmsbach Valley Railway was reactivated for passenger traffic in 1999, there was also discussion of the possible reactivation of the Grävenwiesbach–Weilmünster section of the Weil Valley Railway. These plans were not followed up concretely and were later rejected.
