= Hessenpark =

Open-air museum in Neu-Anspach, Germany

Coordinates: 50°16′30″N 8°31′52″E

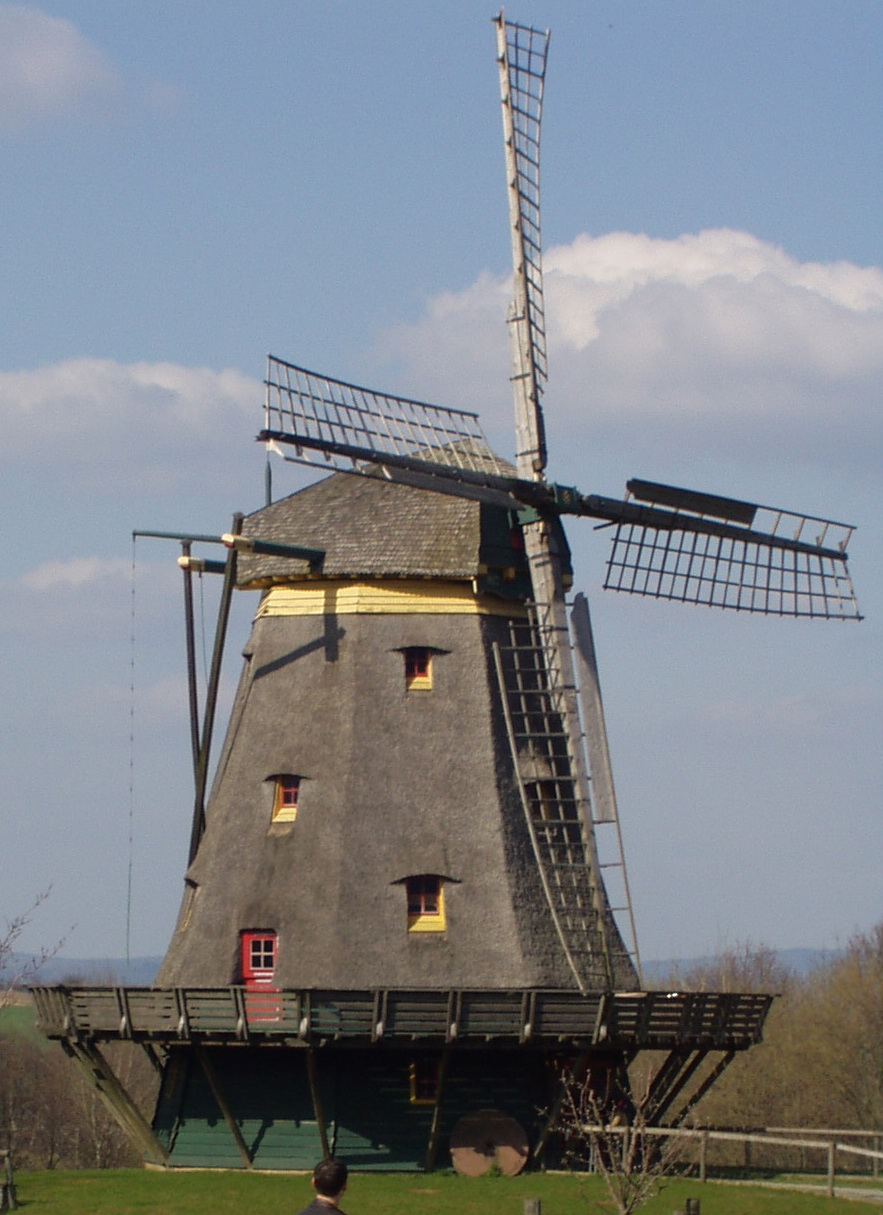
The windmill, one of the Hessenpark's attractions

The Hessenpark is an open-air museum in Neu-Anspach (near Wehrheim-Obernhain), Hesse, Germany. It was founded in 1974 by the Hesse State Government headed by Albert Osswald (SPD).

The museum showcases half-timbered buildings from the land of Hesse. As of 2006, there were almost 100 houses on display.

The Hessenpark is a popular family destination.

== Concept ==
One of the major goals of Hessenpark museum is to preserve and display traditional buildings from various regions around the state of Hesse. Exhibits are grouped into "Baugruppen" (building ensembles) that represent the way these buildings may have been found in their original locations, such as villages, farmsteads or workshops, often including historical furniture, tools and machinery.

Due to cultural heritage management laws in Germany, traditional buildings can only be moved or demolished under exceptional circumstances. Hessenpark represents one of the ways in which such a building may avoid demolition. In this case, the building is carefully deconstructed, moved to the museum grounds and re-erected. In this manner, the museum is able to provide its visitors with new exhibits on a regular basis.

Other goals of Hessenpark include

- to give an impression of typical village life in Hesse over the last centuries
- to preserve knowledge about traditional building techniques and materials
- to preserve and display crafts and trades typical for the region, such as basket weaving, bread making, beekeeping, metalworking, charcoal burning and others
- to use and demonstrate traditional farming methods, grow traditional crops and vegetables and keep farm animals that would have been typical for the time period.

Besides the educational aspects, Hessenpark is frequently used for events such as weddings. It also offers an annual christmas market. The marktplatz building ensemble hosts several restaurants, shops and a goldsmith.

== Landmarks ==
- the Village Church
- the Synagogue
- the Village School
- the Post Office
- the Market Place
- the Bakery
- the Windmills
- the Water Mill
- the Blacksmith's Shop
- the Typography

== Image gallery ==
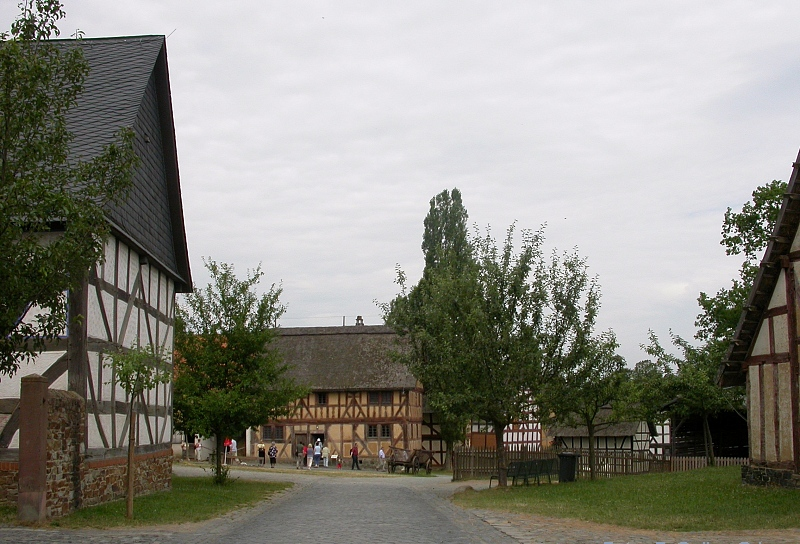
Hessenpark

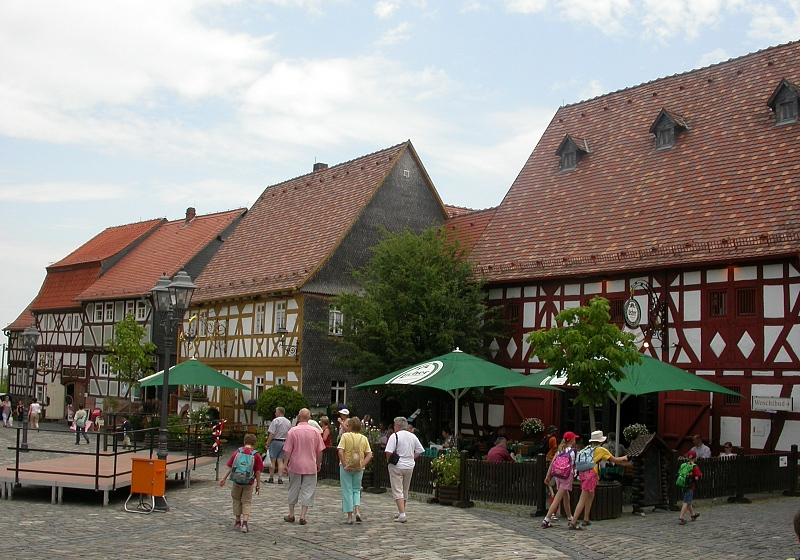
Marketplace

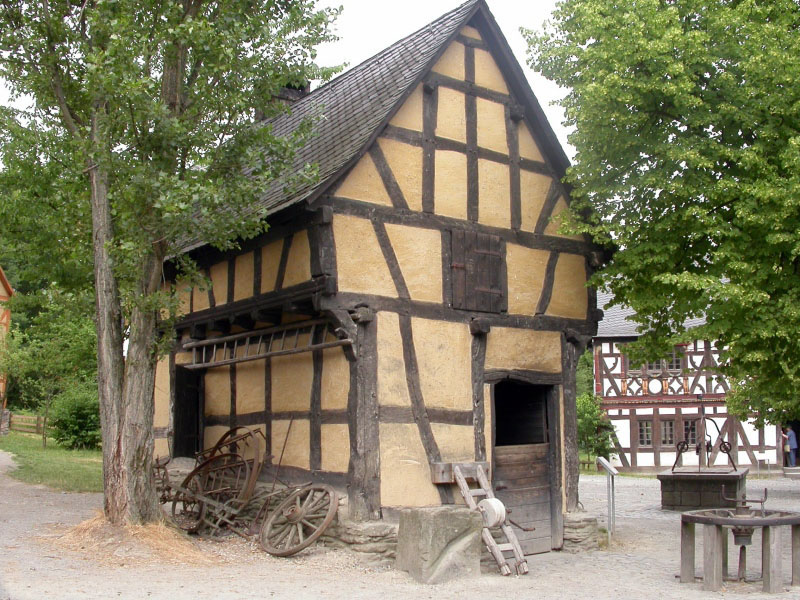
The Old Blacksmith's Shop

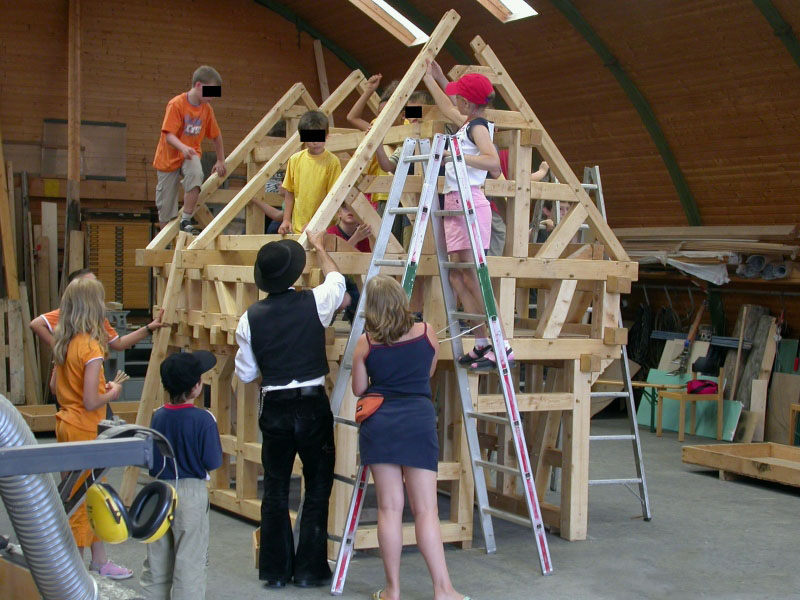
Children building a replica

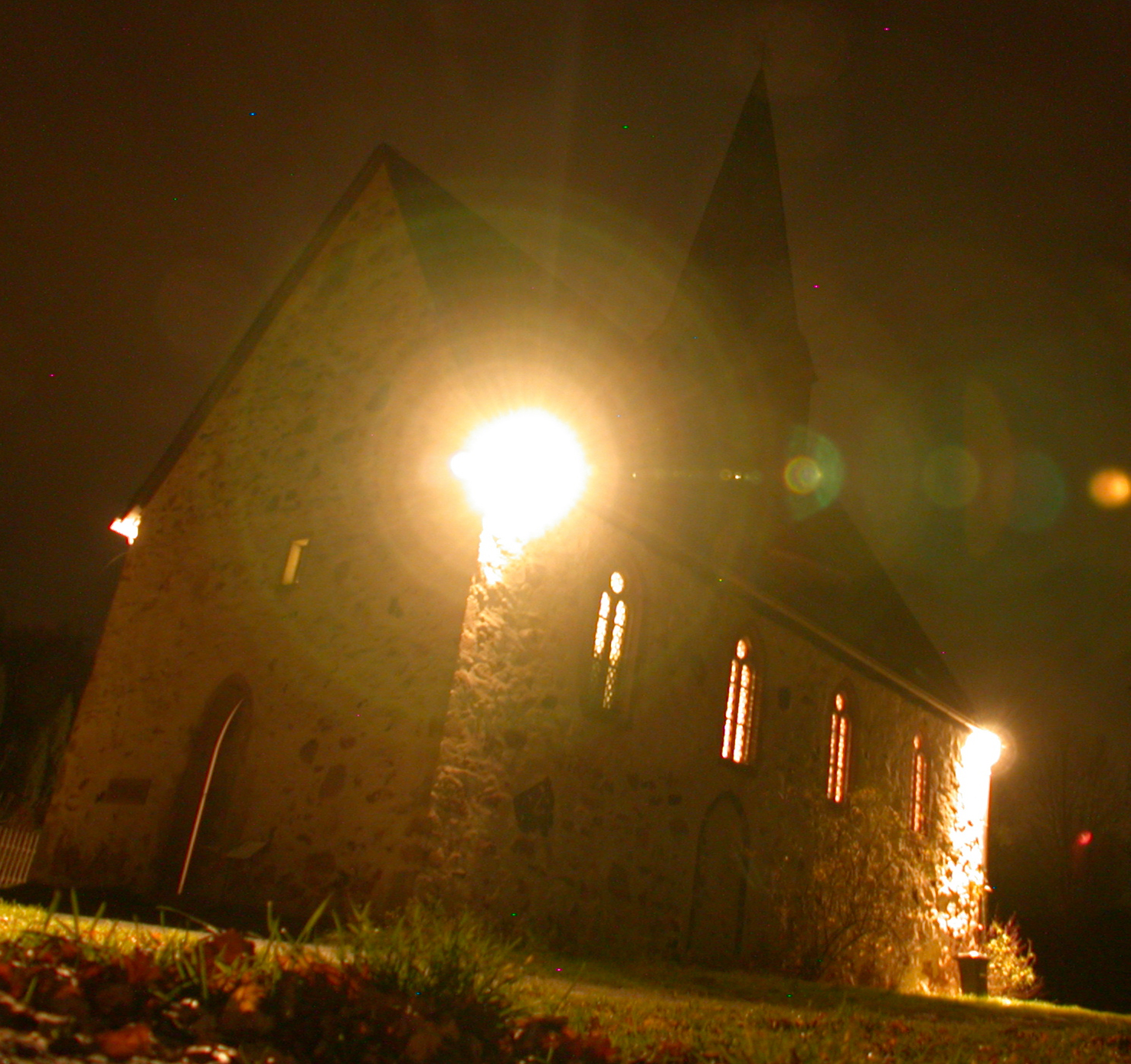
The Lollar Chapel at night
