= Grävenwiesbach =

- Municipality
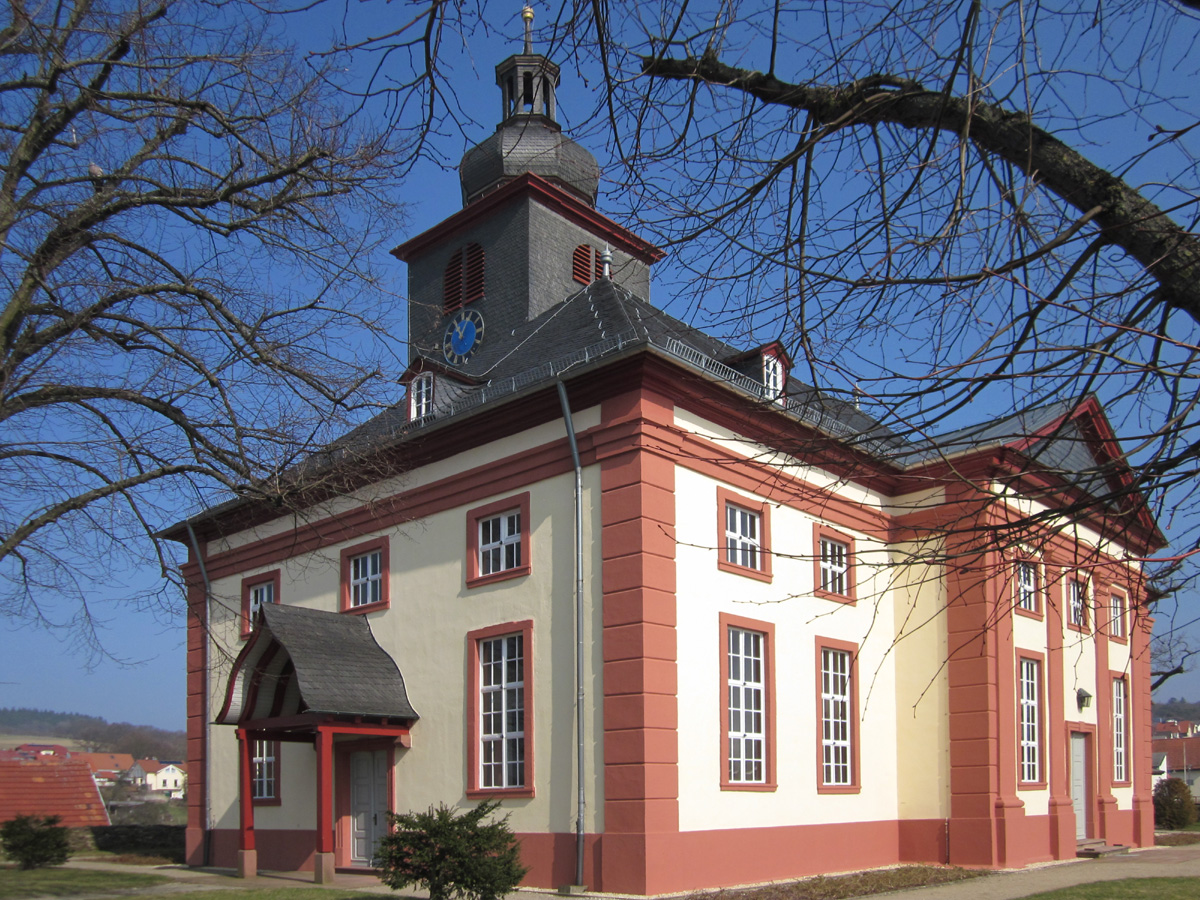
- Protestant church

- Flag Coat of arms

- Location of Grävenwiesbach within Hochtaunuskreis district
- Interactive map of Grävenwiesbach
- Location within Germany Location within Hesse
- Coordinates: 50°23′09″N 8°27′24″E
- Country: Germany
- State: Hesse
- Admin. region: Darmstadt
- District: Hochtaunuskreis

Government
  - Mayor (2017–23): Roland Seel (CDU)

Area
  - Total: 43.16 km^{2} (16.66 sq mi)
- Elevation: 326 m (1,070 ft)

Population (2025-12-31)
  - Total: 5,348
  - Density: 123.9/km^{2} (320.9/sq mi)
- Time zone: UTC+01:00 (CET)
  - Summer (DST): UTC+02:00 (CEST)
- Postal codes: 61279
- Dialling codes: 06086
- Vehicle registration: HG, USI
- Website: www.graevenwiesbach.de

Grävenwiesbach is a municipality in the Hochtaunuskreis in Hesse, Germany.

== Geography ==
=== Location ===
Grävenwiesbach lies between 300 and 600 m above sea level north of the Taunus Ridge. The nearest big towns are Wetzlar (20 km) to the north, Limburg (32 km) to the west and Frankfurt am Main (40 km) to the south.

=== Neighbouring communities ===
Grävenwiesbach borders in the north on the communities of Weilmünster (Limburg-Weilburg) and Waldsolms (Lahn-Dill-Kreis), in the east on the towns of Butzbach (Wetteraukreis) and Usingen, and in the south and west on the community of Weilrod (both in the Hochtaunuskreis).

=== Constituent communities ===
The community consists of the centres of Grävenwiesbach, Heinzenberg, Hundstadt, Laubach, Mönstadt and Naunstadt.

== History ==
Grävenwiesbach had its first documentary mention in 1280. As of 1326, the village belonged to the County – later Principality – of Nassau-Weilburg, with which it passed in 1806 to the newly created Duchy of Nassau. In 1866, Grävenwiesbach became Prussian.

== Politics ==
=== Municipal council ===
The municipal elections on 26 March 2006 yielded the following results:

FWG	8 seats
CDU	6 seats
SPD	6 seats
Greens	2 seats
FDP	1 seat

Note: FWG is a citizens' coalition.

=== Partnerships ===
Grävenwiesbach has maintained a partnership with Wuenheim in Alsace, France since 6 September 1980.

=== Coat of arms ===
Grävenwiesbach's civic coat of arms might heraldically be described thus: Or a spreadeagle sable armed and langued gules, above each wing a mullet of six azure.

The earliest town seals show this same composition, including one example known from 1534 but dating from the previous century. The arms have remained virtually unchanged since then, but were only officially granted in 1952, at which time the tincture azure (blue) was chosen for the mullets (stars), as that was Nassau's colour, under which Grävenwiesbach had lived for centuries. The reason for the mullets being in the arms, however, is not known. The eagle is, of course, the old Imperial eagle.

== Economy and infrastructure ==
=== Transport ===
On 1 June 1909, the Frankfurt - Bad Homburg - Usingen - Weilburg railway line also reached Grävenwiesbach. After a spur line to Wetzlar was opened on 1 November 1912, Grävenwiesbach station became a small railway hub. This was the beginning of moderate industrialization as well as the first step towards reorienting Grävenwiesbach towards the Rhine-Main economic area.

Nowadays, Grävenwiesbach is an operations centre for the Taunusbahn railway, run by the Start Deutschland GmbH , and running from Bad Homburg to Usingen and on to Brandoberndorf.

=== Education ===
In Grävenwiesbach there is only a primary school. A Hauptschule, a Realschule and a Gymnasium are available in Usingen.

== Literature ==
- So war es einst. Grävenwiesbach im Wandel der Zeiten. Publisher: Heimatverein Grävenwiesbach e.V., ISBN 3-00-010271-X
- Unsere Bahn. Publisher: Heimatverein Grävenwiesbach e.V.
