= Wehrheim =

- Municipality
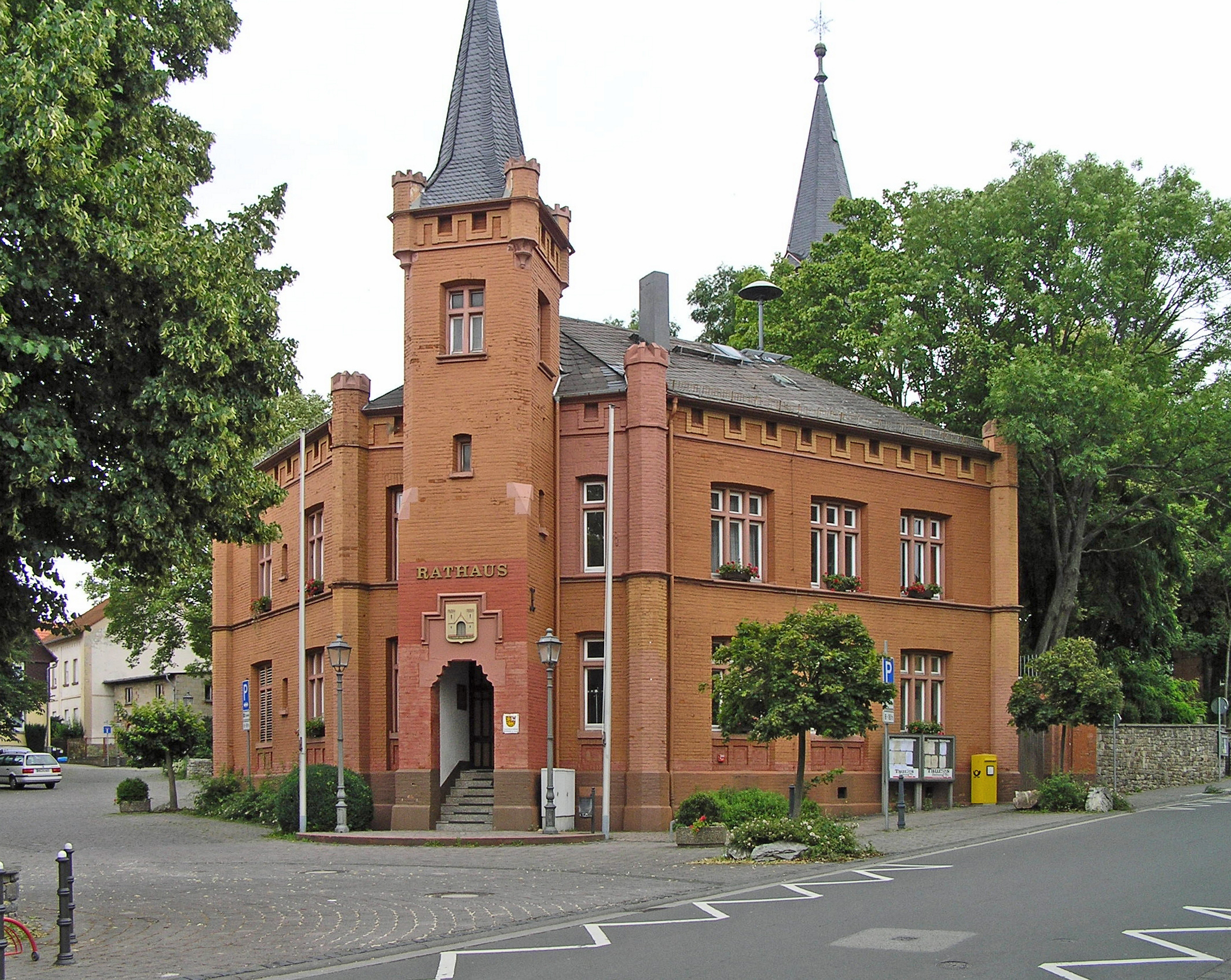
- Red town hall

- Flag Coat of arms

- Location of Wehrheim within Hochtaunuskreis district
- Interactive map of Wehrheim
- Location within Germany Location within Hesse
- Coordinates: 50°18′N 8°34′E
- Country: Germany
- State: Hesse
- Admin. region: Darmstadt
- District: Hochtaunuskreis

Government
  - Mayor (2019–25): Gregor Sommer (CDU)

Area
  - Total: 38.34 km^{2} (14.80 sq mi)
- Elevation: 305 m (1,001 ft)

Population (2025-12-31)
  - Total: 9,202
  - Density: 240.0/km^{2} (621.6/sq mi)
- Time zone: UTC+01:00 (CET)
  - Summer (DST): UTC+02:00 (CEST)
- Postal codes: 61273
- Dialling codes: 06081
- Vehicle registration: HG, USI
- Website: www.wehrheim.de

Wehrheim (German pronunciation: [ˈveːɐ̯haɪm]) is a municipality in Hesse, Germany, some 30 km (20 mi) north of Frankfurt am Main.

The town's nickname is "Apfeldorf Wehrheim" (Apple-village Wehrheim).

== Geography ==
=== Location ===
Wehrheim lies from 300 to 600 m above sea level on the north slope of the crest of the Taunus between Bad Homburg and Usingen im Taunus.

=== Neighbouring communities ===
Wehrheim borders in the north on the town of Usingen and the community of Ober-Mörlen (Wetteraukreis), in the east on the towns of Friedberg and Rosbach (both in the Wetteraukreis), in the south on the towns of Friedrichsdorf and Bad Homburg vor der Höhe, and in the west on the town of Neu-Anspach.

=== Constituent communities ===
The community has four centres named Wehrheim, Obernhain, Pfaffenwiesbach and Friedrichsthal.

== History ==
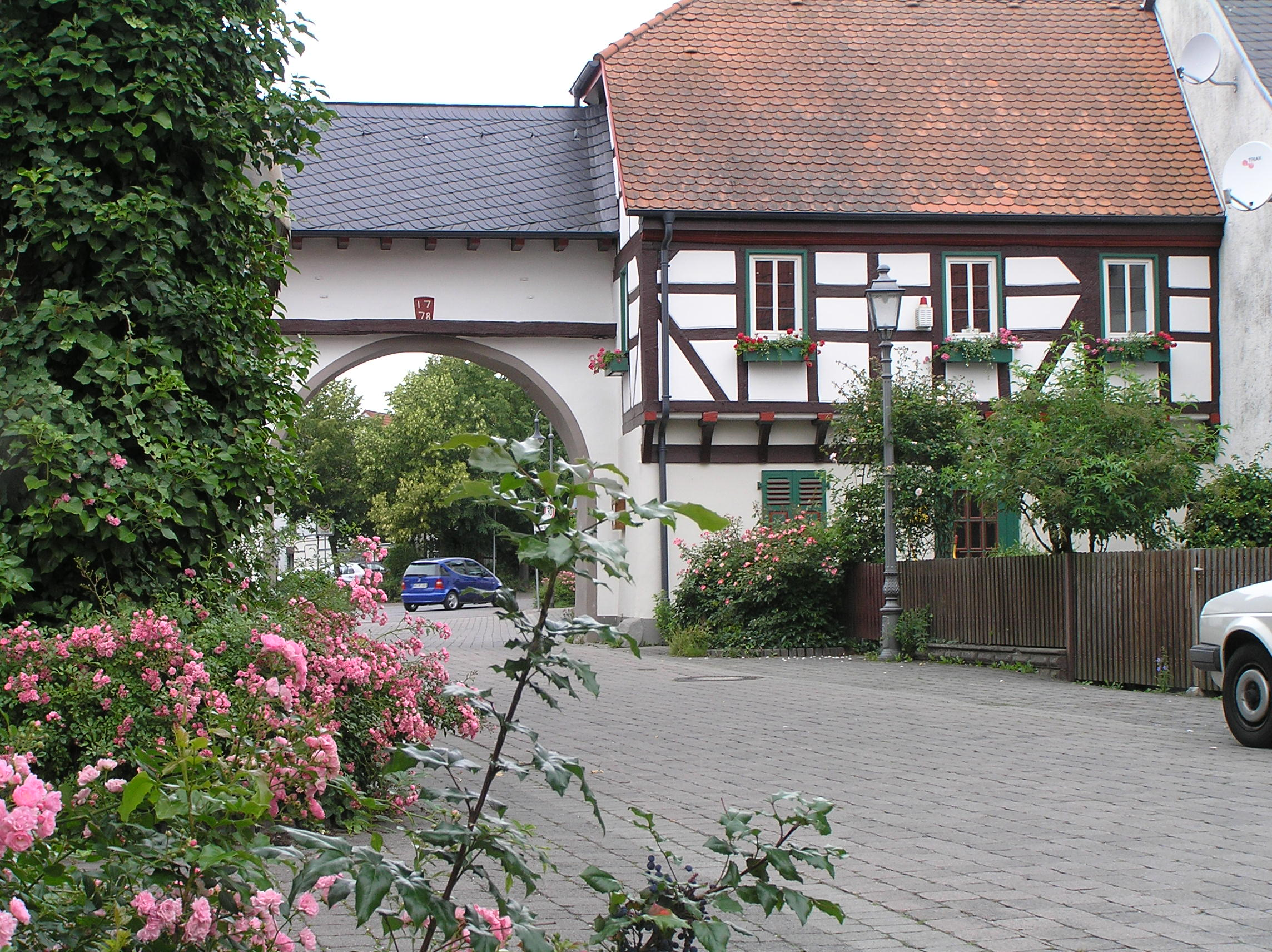
City gate

The first traces of settlement go back to the Bronze Age. In Wehrheim, a burying ground from the early to middle Urnfield culture (11th to 10th century BC) was discovered. Wehrheim im Taunus itself had its first documentary mention in 1046. In 1372, the village was granted town rights, which it however lost again in 1814. The town's overlords changed several times, from the Castle Counts of Friedberg to the Counts of Diez, the area then passing to Nassau-Dillenburg and finally to Prussia in 1866. In 1895 the railway line from Bad Homburg vor der Höhe – then still called Homberg – through Friedrichsdorf to Usingen came into operation, and was extended to Weilburg a few years later, linking the community a bit more closely with the Frankfurt area, a trend that would continue in the coming century.

As part of Hesse's municipal reforms, the communities of Wehrheim, Obernhain, Pfaffenwiesbach and Friedrichsthal merged into the new greater community of Wehrheim in 1972.

== Politics ==
=== Municipal council ===
The municipal elections on 6 March 2016 resulted in the following division of seats on town council: compared to previous local elections:

Parties and constituencies		% 2016	seats 2016	% 2011	seats 2011	% 2006	seats 2006	% 2001	seats 2001
CDU	CDU	46.2	14	43.3	13	51.4	16	47.2	15
SPD	SPD	23.9	8	24.8	8	26.3	8	28.3	9
Grüne	Greens	16.7	5	23.3	7	11.8	4	11.2	3
FDP	FDP	13.3	4	6.0	2	8.5	2	5.4	2
REP	REP	—	—	2.7	1	2.0	1	2.8	1
GOP-FWG	Councillors without party affiliation – Free voting community	—	—	—	—	—	—	5.1	1
Total		100.0	31	100.0	31	100.0	31	100.0	31
Voter turnout in %		61.1		56.5		54.8		63.9	

=== Mayor ===
Gregor Sommer (CDU) has been mayor since 2002.

Mayor	Tenure
Johann Peter Jäger	1849–1882
August Manck	1882–1900
Peter Eifert	1900–1908
Heinrich Velte	1908–1928
Otto Friedrich Manck	1928–1929
Karl Dillenmuth (SPD)	1929–1933
Heinrich Wilhelm (NSDAP)	1933–1945
Ludwig Bender (CDU)	1946–1959
Richard Wagner (SPD)	1960–1979
Josef König (CDU)	1980–1985
Aribert Oehm (SPD)	1986–1991
Helmut Michel (CDU)	1992–2002
Gregor Sommer (CDU)	2002–now

=== Sister cities ===
- Pilisvörösvár near Budapest in Hungary, since 1989.
- Meransen in the Puster Valley in Italy, since 2001.

=== Coat of arms ===
The community's current civic coat of arms was granted in 1953 and is based on seals known from the 15th century. The arms show the two lions of the Counts of Diez, and the letter is, of course, the community's initial.

Wehrheim once had another coat of arms after the original one was apparently forgotten. It appeared in the 19th century and featured a building with towers. This is believed to have been a canting symbol since it was a military structure (Wehr is a German word for "army"). These arms were used, without ever being officially approved, until the current arms were conferred in 1953.

== Economy and infrastructure ==
=== Transport ===
Despite its idyllic location in the Taunus, Wehrheim is advantageously placed for transportation. With the Friedberg interchange on Autobahn A 5 6 km away, and the Oberursel-Nord interchange on Autobahn A 661 only 8 km away it is well connected to the long-distance road network.

The community has at its disposal two stops, Wehrheim and Saalburg, on the Taunusbahn railway (officially called line 15 by the RMV, or Rhein-Main-Verkehrsverbund).

=== Established businesses ===
Earplugs made by the firm Ohropax GmbHA are well-known product from Wehrheim, marketed under the name Ohropax. Heraeus Medical, a division of Heraeus, the manufacturer of Palacos® bone cement, is also located in Wehrheim.

=== Educational institutions ===
Wehrheim has one primary school, the Limes-Schule. There is also a special school, the Heinrich-Kielhorn-Schule, named after an early pioneer in special education.

The Taunusheim, an orphanage established in 1943 to house war orphans, was until 1998 a home for children and youths run by the city of Frankfurt. Before that, the building housed the Waldfriede Hotel.

Taunusheim youth home, now boarded up

In the last twenty years of its existence, the Taunusheim was home to up to 18 children and young people from 6 to 18 years old, looked after round the clock in two groups. In 1994, a day group also attended the home.

The home was closed in 1998 for reasons of economy. The school for children with learning difficulties that was attached to the home remained until 2001, when it was moved to Frankfurt-Höchst.

Moving part of the Wehrheim primary school into the now empty building is being considered as a way of alleviating the dearth of school space.

== Culture and sightseeing ==
=== Museum ===
Inside the former town gate, a local landmark, is the Stadtormuseum Wehrheim ("Wehrheim Town Gate Museum"), where visitors can see the Bronze-Age archaeological finds from the Urnfield culture (see History).

=== Buildings ===
The Wehrheim municipal area contains 13 km of the Limes Germanicus which was declared a World Heritage Site in 2005 by UNESCO. One of Wehrheim's sights, near Pfaffenwiesbach, is an old Roman Limes Fort, the Kapersburg, on top of the Limes. There is another Roman fort in the main community, the Saalburg, which has been restored.

=== Other ===
The theme park Lochmühle is another one of Wehrheim's attractions, it features a combination of animals and theme park rides.
