= Taunus Railway (High Taunus) =

German railway line

Overview
- Native name: Taunusbahn
- Line number: 9374
- Locale: Hesse, Germany

Service
- Route number: 637

Technical
- Line length: 42 km (26 mi)
- Track gauge: 1,435 mm (4 ft 8 1/2 in) standard gauge
- Minimum radius: 200 m (660 ft)
- Operating speed: 80 km/h (50 mph) (maximum)
- Maximum incline: 2.17%

The Taunus Railway in the High Taunus (German: Taunusbahn (Hochtaunus)) is a railway route between Frankfurt (Main) Hauptbahnhof and Brandoberndorf via Bad Homburg, Usingen and Grävenwiesbach. It was operated from 1993 to 1995 by the Frankfurter Verkehrsverbund (Frankfurt transport association, FVV) as the T-Bahn and subsequently by the Rhein-Main-Verkehrsverbund (Rhine-Main transport association, RMV) as line 15 (RB 15). It is listed in table 637 of the Deutsche Bahn timetable. The Friedrichsdorf–Brandoberndorf line, which has the infrastructure number of 9374, forms part of the old Friedrichsdorf–Wetzlar line, which was known as the Taunusbahn. The line is owned by the Verkehrsverband Hochtaunus (High Taunus transport association, VHT). The infrastructure is managed by HLB Basis AG on behalf of the VHT.

== Operations ==
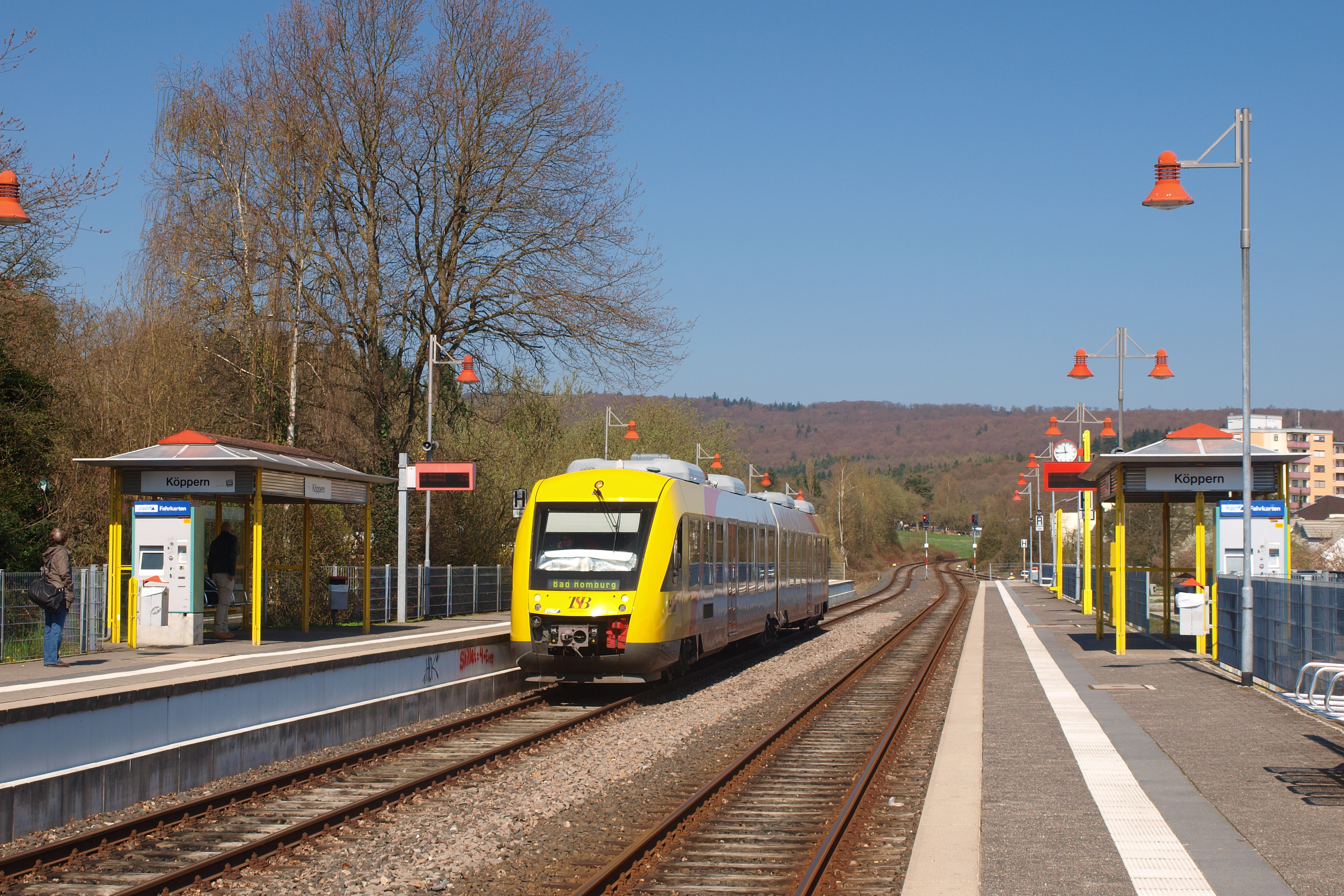
S-Bahn standards (high platforms and platform display) in Köppern station

The Taunus Railway is one of three S-Bahn-like suburban lines to the west of Frankfurt, which are operated by Hessischen Landesbahn GmbH (HLB) through its subsidiary HLB Hessenbahn GmbH. All stations have platform displays installed, which notify the next train.

975,000 train-kilometres per year are operated over the line, which can be operated over at up to 80 km/h (50 mph).

=== Rolling stock ===
The rolling stock used are LHB VT 2E diesel multiple units, which were modernised in 2006/2007. Eleven DMUs procured specifically for the Taunus Railway by the VHT were procured together with nine DMUs of the HLB to be used on the lines to Königstein and Bad Soden. Since the 2006 timetable change, they have been supported by ten LINT 41/H sets. From their procurement in 1994/1995 to their replacement by LINT sets, the Taunus Railway was also served by class 628 sets and two class 629 railcars.

=== Rail services ===
Services on the Taunus Railway operate every half hour on weekdays. In addition, four or five additional train pairs operate in the morning and afternoon peaks from Monday to Friday; these operate to/from Frankfurt (Main) Hauptbahnhof and, for operational reasons, run predominantly to/from Königstein. About every second train ends in Grävenwiesbach, while Brandoberndorf is served every hour. On Saturday, apart from a break in the morning, there is also a service every half hour between Grävenwiesbach and Bad Homburg until about 4 pm; and on Sundays there is an hourly service over the whole route. The timetable is designed so that the trains that end in Bad Homburg always has a connection to S-Bahn line S 5 to/from Frankfurt.

The towns and district that are away from the line are connected to the Taunus Railway by bus services that are commissioned by the VHT.

== Route ==
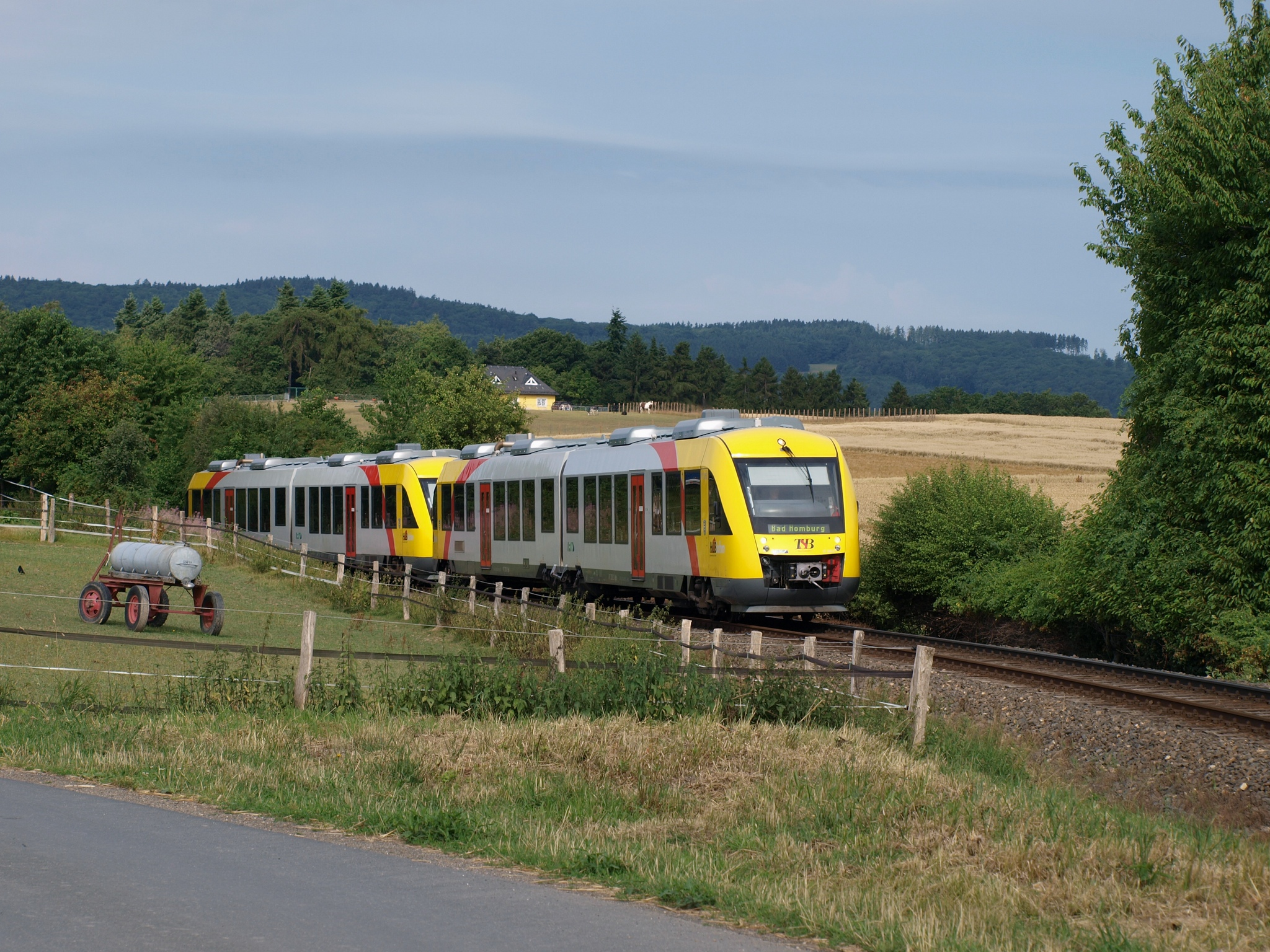
LINT double set shortly after Neu-Anspach

The line consists of part of the former Deutsche Bundesbahn Frankfurt–Wetzlar (Solmsbach Valley Railway) and Frankfurt–Weilburg (Weil Valley Railway) lines, which were closed by Deutsche Bundesbahn beyond Grävenwiesbach. Today services on the Taunus Railway run on the extension of the Homburg Railway to Friedrichsdorf, which they share with the S5 services. They continue to Brandoberndorf over the single-track and non-electrified line, which is the property of the Verkehrsverband Hochtaunus.

In the peak hour, trains start and end every hour at Frankfurt Hbf. In contrast to the S5, the trains do not stop underground, but on the above-ground long-distance tracks. While the S5 services turn to run on the Homburg Railway immediately north of Frankfurt West station, the Taunus Railway service (the RB 15) first runs on the regional tracks towards Frankfurt-Höchst (Taunus Railway) and then curves on the Rebstock lands on a connecting curve (Rebstockkurve) of the former Bad Nauheim–Wiesbaden railway (Bäderbahn) to join the route of the S5 shortly before Rödelheim station. It follows the S5 service with only two stops in Rödelheim and Oberursel to Bad Homburg

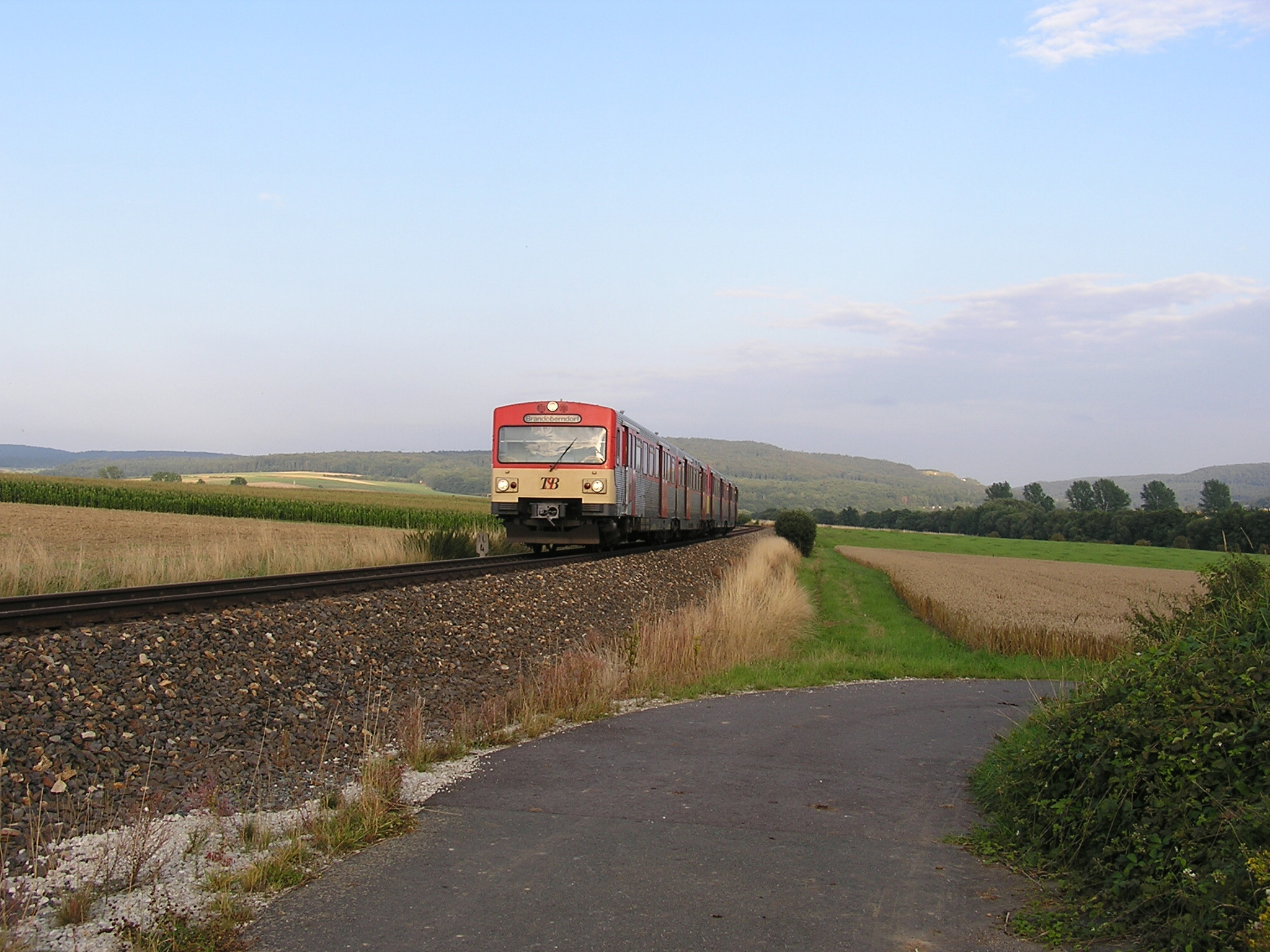
VT 2E of the Hessische Landesbahn on the Taunusbahn on the way from Wehrheim to Neu-Anspach

The regular interval services start In Bad Homburg. After Seulberg, where the Taunus Railway services to and from Frankfurt mostly do not stop, the Taunus Railway reaches Friedrichsdorf, the terminus of the RB 16 and the S5 services. This is the start of a moderate climb past the former Industrial siding from Rühl Chemie and the Tettauer glassworks to the first crossing station at Köppern, which has a short loading track next to the platform tracks. The line passes through the main ridge of the Taunus in the Köppern valley, following the Erlenbach, and passes through Saalburg station, which was designated as Saalburg/Lochmühle from 1993 to 2008, and the Limes. An uphill section begins after Wehrheim station, which also has a loading track. Over the hill, after passing an old brickyard (which once have a siding), a curved section leads to Neu-Anspach, which was the only station that had been reduced to a halt (Haltepunkt, that is, has no sets of points) before the modernisation of the line. It was re-equipped with points in 1992. Just under a kilometre further is the halt of Hausen.

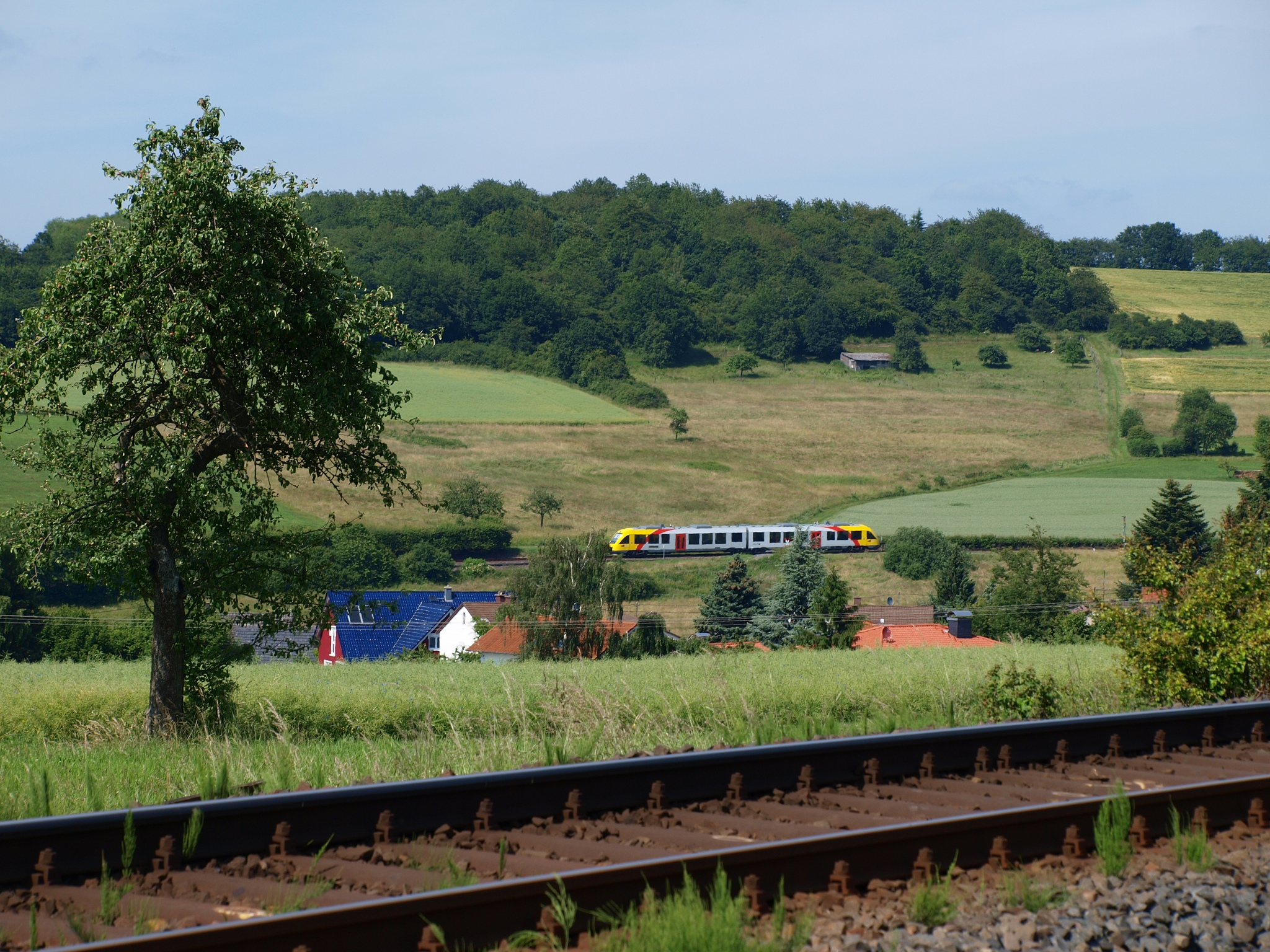
LINT on the Hundstadt Curve

A long run through open fields leads to Usingen, where the line's central signal box is located and trains are stored, assembled, disassembled and refueled. This was formerly the location of the loading station of the 4 km-long narrow-gauge railway to a geyserite works (now Bremthaler Quarzitwerk) and a siding from Raiffeisen Waren-Zentrale Rhein-Main (an agricultural cooperative). The section with the steepest grade (up to 2.147%) begins there; Wilhelmsdorf station, which is at the end of it, is a good 390 metres above sea level. A narrow gauge railway branched off here against the direction of travel to Merzhausen military airfield (now used for the Erdfunkstelle Usingen, Usingen earth station). After another slight climb past the junction of the BGS camp, the line reaches its high point at the edge of the forest. From there it goes to Grävenwiesbach, where some trains can be stored, and down around a loop to Hundstadt.

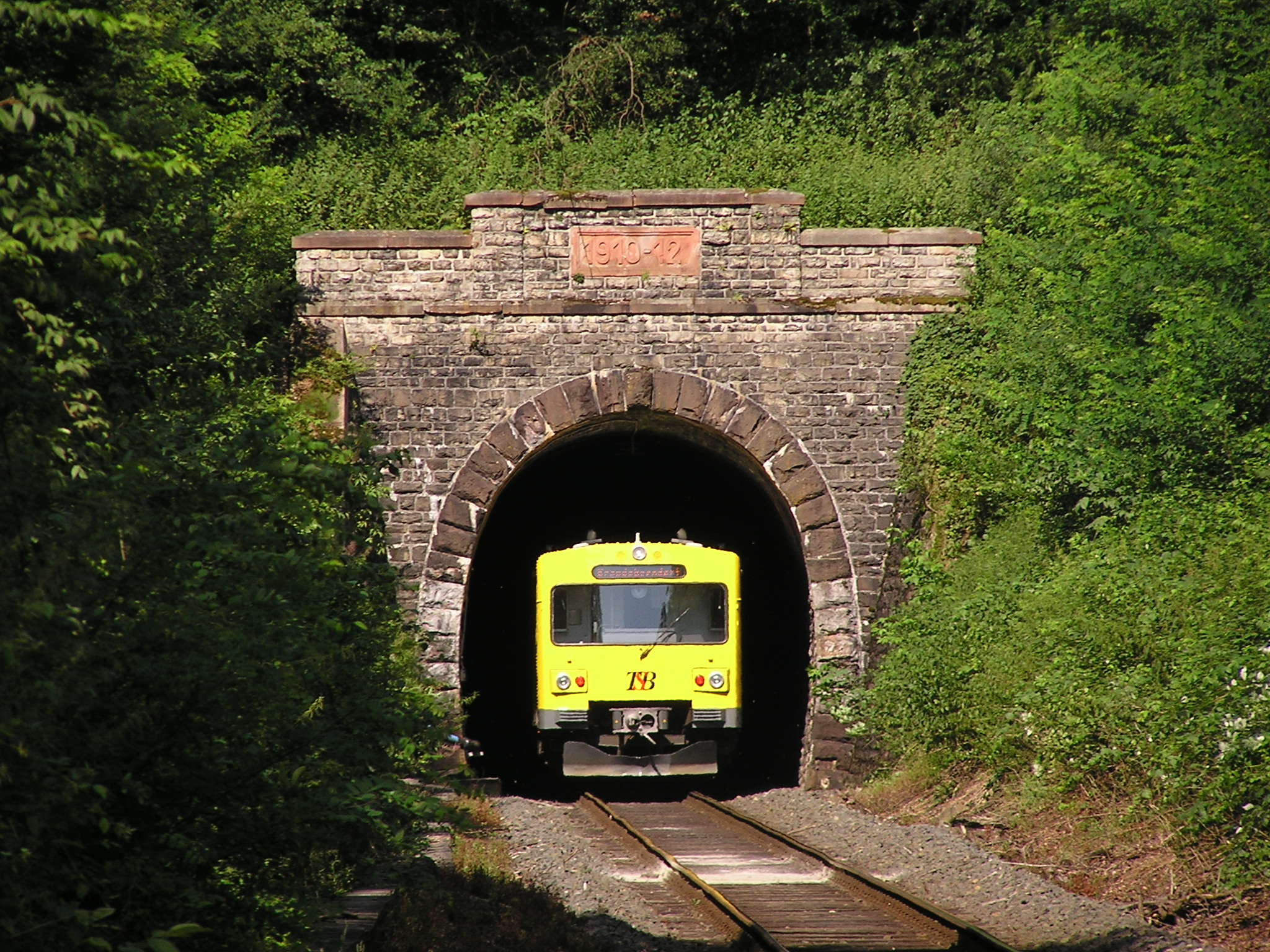
Hasselborn Tunnel (1,300 m)

The continuation of the line, on the route of the original Solmsbach Valley Railway (Solmsbachtalbahn), climbs past the former Jägerhaus timber loading point, which was used in freight operations from 1913 to 1985 and for passenger traffic from 1954 to 1981, and immediately afterwards passes through the Hasselborn Tunnel, which passes through the border into the Lahn-Dill-Kreis. The 1,300 m-long tunnel lies on a slight incline and is almost straight. During the war, it was originally supposed to be used for the safe storage of the special trains of Adolf Hitler while he was in the nearby Adlerhorst. Due to the increasing air raids on Frankfurt around 1941, the VDM copper works at Heddernheim shifted parts of the war production here and used forced labourers, which is commemorated on a plaque near the south portal. Shortly after the end of the tunnel is the new halt of Hasselborn which was moved from the old station about 100 metres closer to the village in 1999. Behind it, the line continues descending, until the final station is finally reached in Brandoberndorf, which is in the municipality of Waldsolms. It is located a few metres south of the old station. There are two unused sidings in the station area.

The stations of Köppern, Saalburg, Wehrheim, Neu-Anspach, Usingen and Wilhelmsdorf on the single-track section have two platform tracks, which are protected on both sides by exit signals, and allow trains to cross; Grävenwiesbach has three tracks. These passing loops mean that the line has significant capacity. There is no crossing loop on the section between Grävenwiesbach and Brandoberndorf.

== History ==
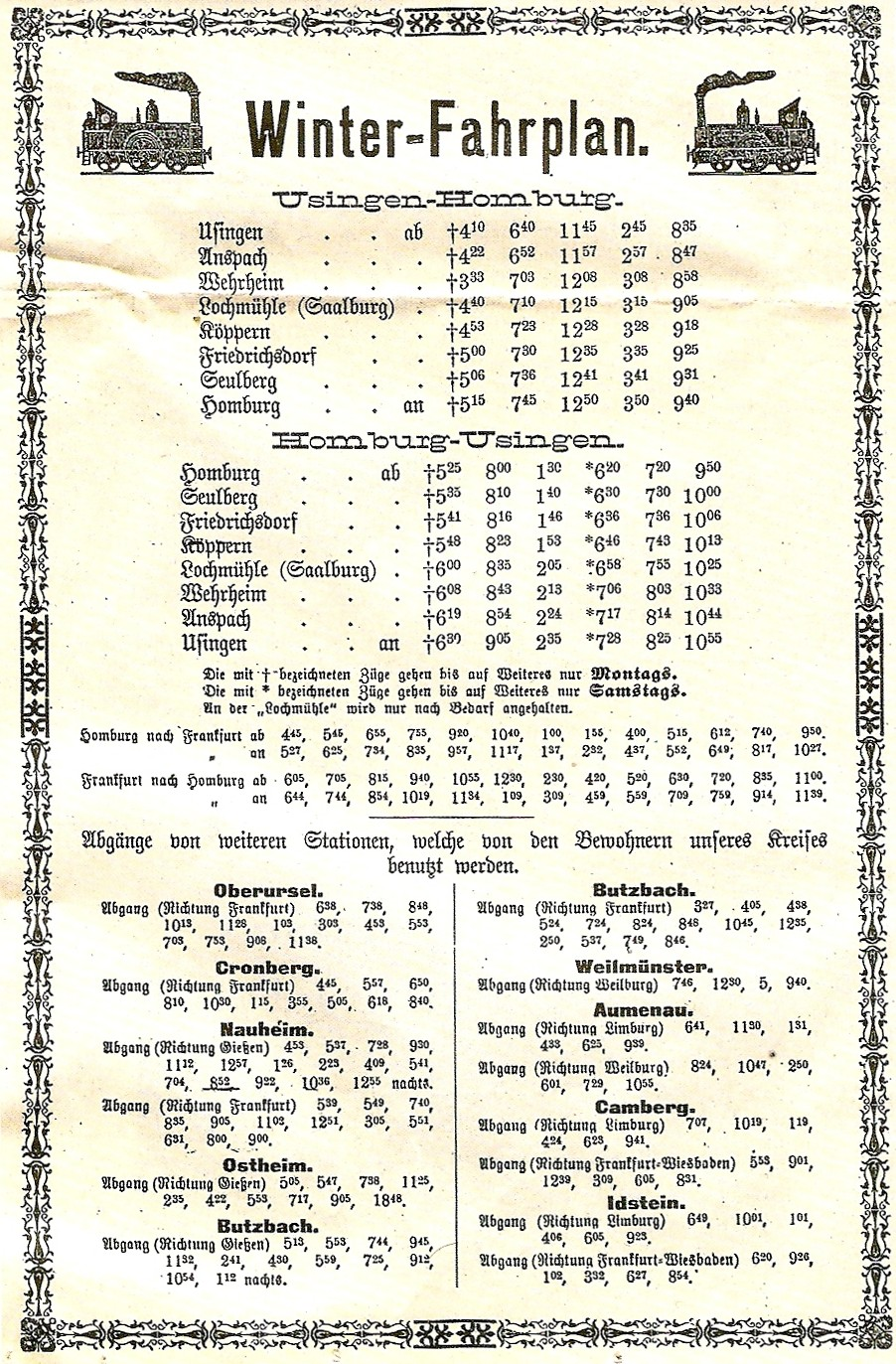
Fahrplan Usingen–Homburg 1895

On 15 October 1895, the Usingen Railway (Usinger Bahn) was opened as an extension of the Homburg Railway, which had opened in 1860. From 1 June 1909, it was extended via a zig zag in Grävenwiesbach to the Lahn valley at Weilburg. The Solmsbach Valley Railway (Solmsbachtalbahn) was opened to Albshausen on 1 November 1912. Initially a junction station, Bad Homburg Neu, was built in Bad Homburg; this was located some distance from the former terminus of the line from Frankfurt. Both stations in Bad Homburg were replaced by a central station on 26 October 1907, making possible the uninterrupted operation of trains from the Main to the Lahn for the first time. The Homburg Railway was also extended via Friedrichsdorf to Friedberg and later double-tracked. In the process the beginning of the Usingen Railway was moved from Bad Homburg to Friedrichsdorf.

On the evening of 4 October 1944, train no. 2021 from Frankfurt to Usingen was strafed shortly before the entrance to Köppern and 31 people died.

The Weil Valley Railway has not been used since 27 September 1969. Passenger traffic on the Solms Valley Railway was also discontinued on 31 May 1985.

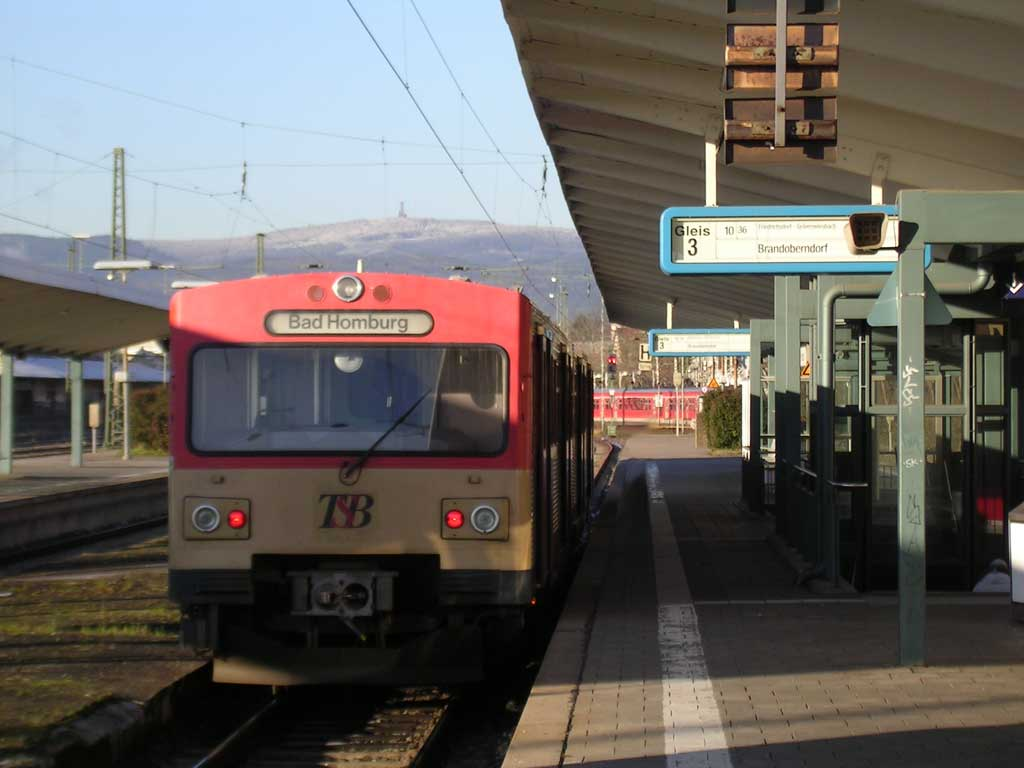
VT 2E railcar in Bad Homburg station

In 1988, a special association of 13 towns, municipalities and the Hochtaunus district founded the Verkehrsverband Hochtaunus (High Taunus transport association, VHT). The line from Grävenwiesbach to Friedrichsdorf (a station now served by the S-Bahn) was still open but threatened with closure, but it was taken over by the VHT in 1989. This was followed by an extensive modernisation of the signaling technology and of the stations over 18 months. The formerly parallel bus service was converted into a feeder route.

The former stations of Saalburg and Neu-Anspach, which had been reduced to halts had their sidings restored. Deutsche Bundesbahn initially continued operations. Since 27 September 1992, through tickets have been issued in the transport association's area in consultation with the Frankfurter Verkehrsverbund (Frankfurt transport association). On 26 September 1993, the Frankfurt-Königsteiner Eisenbahn AG (Frankfurt-Königstein Railway Company, FKE, then a subsidiary of HLB) took over the management of the line on behalf of the transport association and the line was also leased to the FKE. The Taunus Railway trains then ran from Bad Homburg and some ran from Frankfurt Hauptbahnhof in the peak. In contrast to practice in DB and FVV times, services on the Homburg Railway started and ended in Friedrichsdorf and no regular services still continued on the Taunus Railway.

The T-Bahn of the FVV was transferred on 26 May 1995 to the newly founded Rhein-Main-Verkehrsverbund (RMV) and received the regional route number of 15 with services at 30-minute intervals.

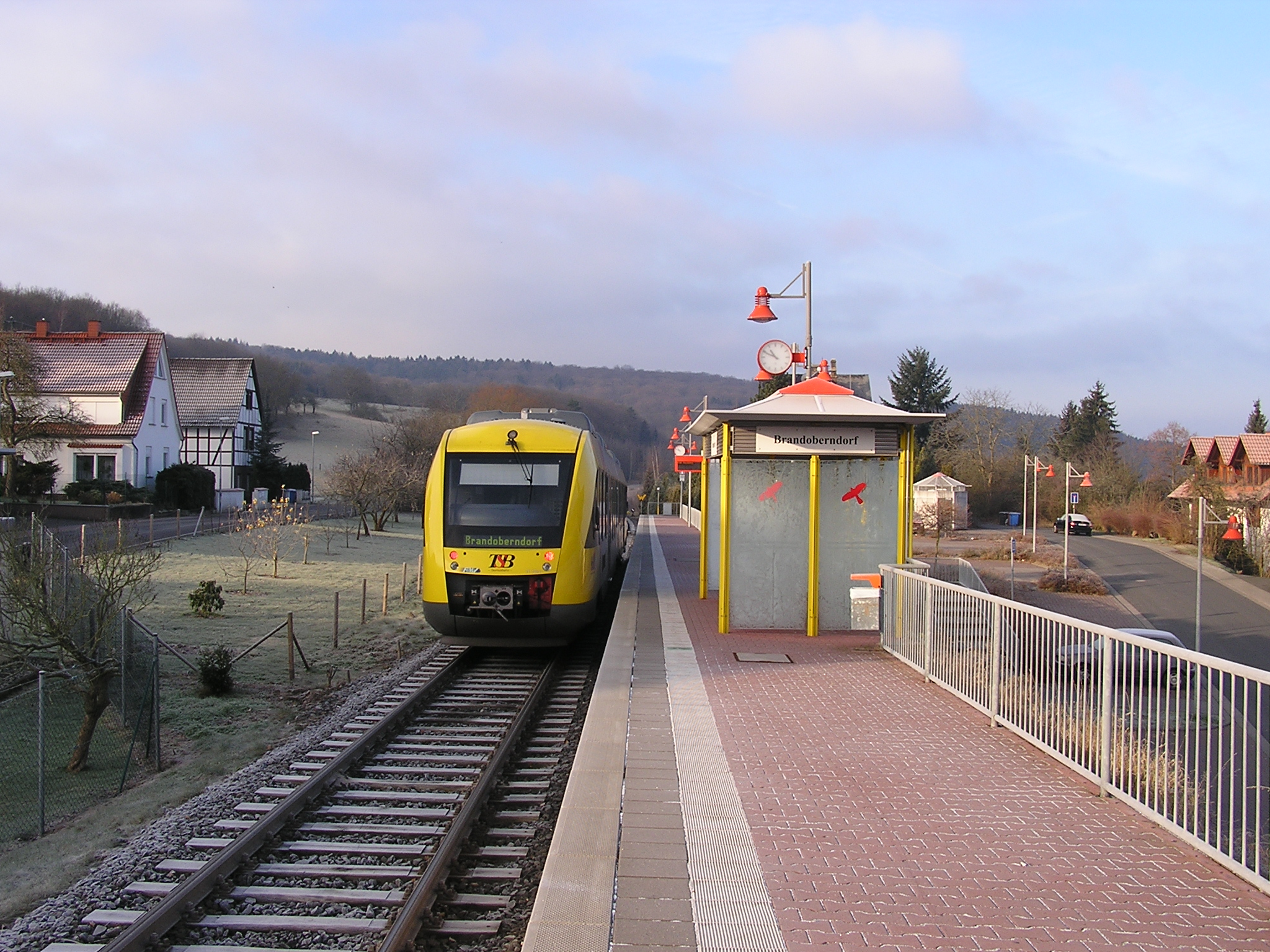
LINT set in the terminus of Brandoberndorf, with the old station in the background

Because of the great success of the new method of operation, the section to Brandoberndorf was reactivated by the VHT and the Verkehrsverbund Lahn Dill (Lahn Dill transport association, VLD) on 15 November 1999. In 1996, the Lahn-Dill-Kreis acquired the route of the eight-kilometre-long railway line between Brandoberndorf and Grävenwiesbach from DB AG and transferred it to the VHT. The Hasselborn Tunnel, which the section of line passes through, was still in an exceptional condition. The signalling was brought up to date and later renovated again. The low speed limit in the tunnel was raised in 2007.

In March 2006, the FKE transferred normal operations to the HLB subsidiary HLB Hessenbahn GmbH. Under the 2006/2007 timetable change, commencing in December 2006, services were cut on many routes due to cuts in local public transport funding, but the Taunus Railway was the only RMV line to gain services.

Following planning in 2005, the platforms of the stations from Köppern to Usingen were extended in the autumn of 2006 in order to enable the operation of trains made up of four VT 2E railcars or three LINT 41 railcars. In November 2007, train destination indicators were installed along the whole line. At the change of timetable on 9 December 2007, the control system was integrated with the signal boxes to clearly indicate departure times and any delays. In February 2008, regular operations were started.

Prior to its modernisation, traffic was forecast to increase from then 1,500 in 1989 to 4,000 passengers per day. 7,000 passengers were counted each day in 1995, 8,000 in 1998, 9,300 in 2005 and 11,000 in 2012.

Freight operations were taken over by DB AG in 1994. The operation were initially operated by a locomotive of the Butzbach-Licher Eisenbahn (BLE), but were later taken over by DB. It was operated ever more rarely and with the abandonment of standard freight rates on 5 November 2000, individual freight movements as required are unusual.

== Prospects ==
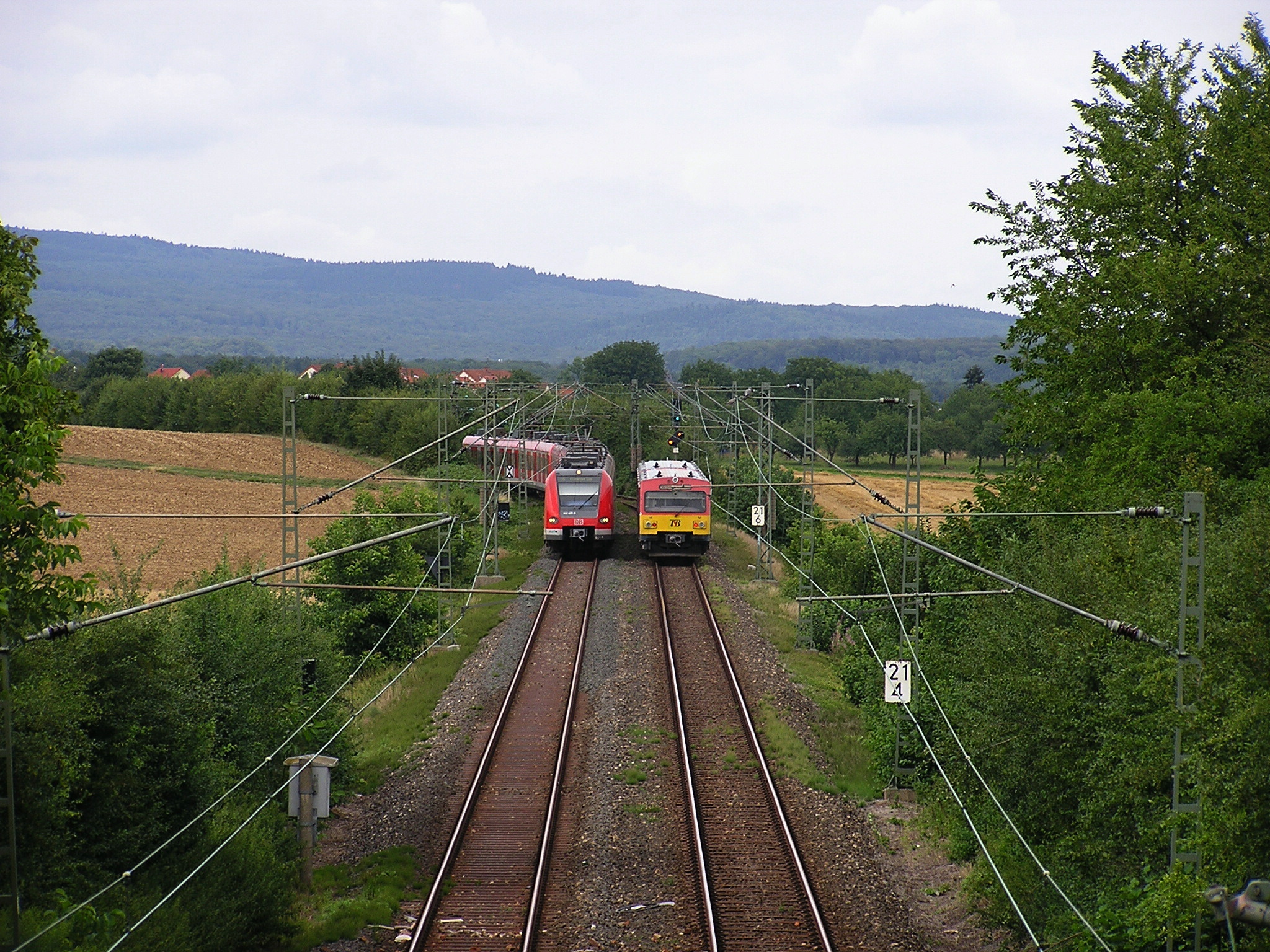
Between Friedrichsdorf and Bad Homburg, Taunusbahn services serve the line with the S-Bahn.

An upgrade of the line to provide better connections is discussed regularly. The current considerations and investigations envisage the electrification of the line to Usingen at the end of 2022 and the extension of S-Bahn line S5 services over this section. This would allow the existing class 423 sets would be used—which would create no additional costs—but new vehicles would need to be procured for electrical operations to Grävenwiesbach. This would have to be done before the start of the upcoming call for tenders for the operation of rail services. However, municipal committees and parties have demanded the electrification of the line beyond Usingen to Grävenwiesbach and Brandoberndorf, which would make its implementation uncertain.

On 18 May 2015, the district council of the Hochtaunuskreis unanimously voted to commission the Hochtaunus transport association to carry out the electrification of the Taunus Railway for the conversion to electrical operations at the timetable change in December 2019. In negotiations with the Rhein-Main-Verkehrsverbund a few points were to be ensured in relation to the operation of the Taunus Railway. These were designed for the long-term protection of the line, in particular the section beyond Usingen (including its possible later electrification), the maintenance of the through trains to and from Frankfurt, barrier-free interchange in Usingen and a coordinated operating concept including feeder buses. In mid-February, a cooperation agreement between the Verkehrsverband Hochtaunus and the Rhein-Main-Verkehrsverbund was concluded, after which the RMV promised to bear half of the planning costs of €4 million. The planning approval procedure would be initiated (according to the assessment at that time) in 2017 and the construction work would begin at the earliest in 2018. Accordingly, the original target date for the changeover to electric operations at the change to the 2019 timetable could not be met. The changeover would occur at the earliest at the timetable change in December 2020 with the introduction of operations under a new contract for the Taunus-Netzes (Taunus network). The feasibility of extending electric operations to Grävenwiesbach would be examined.

A further delay has arisen as a second cost-benefit analysis had to be carried out for the electrification to Grävenwiesbach, which was planned as a second stage. Therefore, the planning approval procedure for the electrification to Usingen will start in 2018. Accordingly, the Verkehrsverband Hochtaunus, as the owner of the line, had not yet announced the approval of the electrification works as of mid-2017. Electrical operations can therefore be started at the earliest at the timetable change in December 2022.

Extensive renovation of the Hasselborn tunnel is required for the extension of electrification to Brandoberndorf. The exact cost was expected to be known in May 2015. In November it was announced that the Rhine-Main Transport Association, the Hochtaunuskreis and the Lahn-Dill had agreed on the work. The RMV agreed to assume a 70% share of the €10 million costs. The rehabilitation is also only possible after the municipality of Waldsolms approved funding for an alternative drinking water supply for the district of Hasselborn (instead of water collected from leakage into the tunnel). Work was scheduled to start around the clock from the start of the summer 2016 holidays until the end of the autumn holidays in a multi-shift operation. On 31 October 2016, the work was completed after four months and the tunnel was reopened for traffic. In this work, 23 of 161 blocks (about 194 metres) of the tunnel were rehabilitated and the remaining blocks are to be rehabilitated in various stages of construction until 2021. The cost of the current construction stage amounts to €3.3 million and the entire renovation of the tunnel is currently estimated to cost about €10 million.

At the beginning of November 2014, it was announced that the Rhein-Main-Verkehrsverbund and Alstom had agreed to use new railcars with fuel cell propulsion (iLINT) on the lines of the Taunus network (12, 13, 15 and 21) from 2018 at the earliest. In the case of the Taunus Railway, the possible electrification would not be affected.
