= Wehrheim station =

Railway station in Wehrheim, Germany

Wehrheim
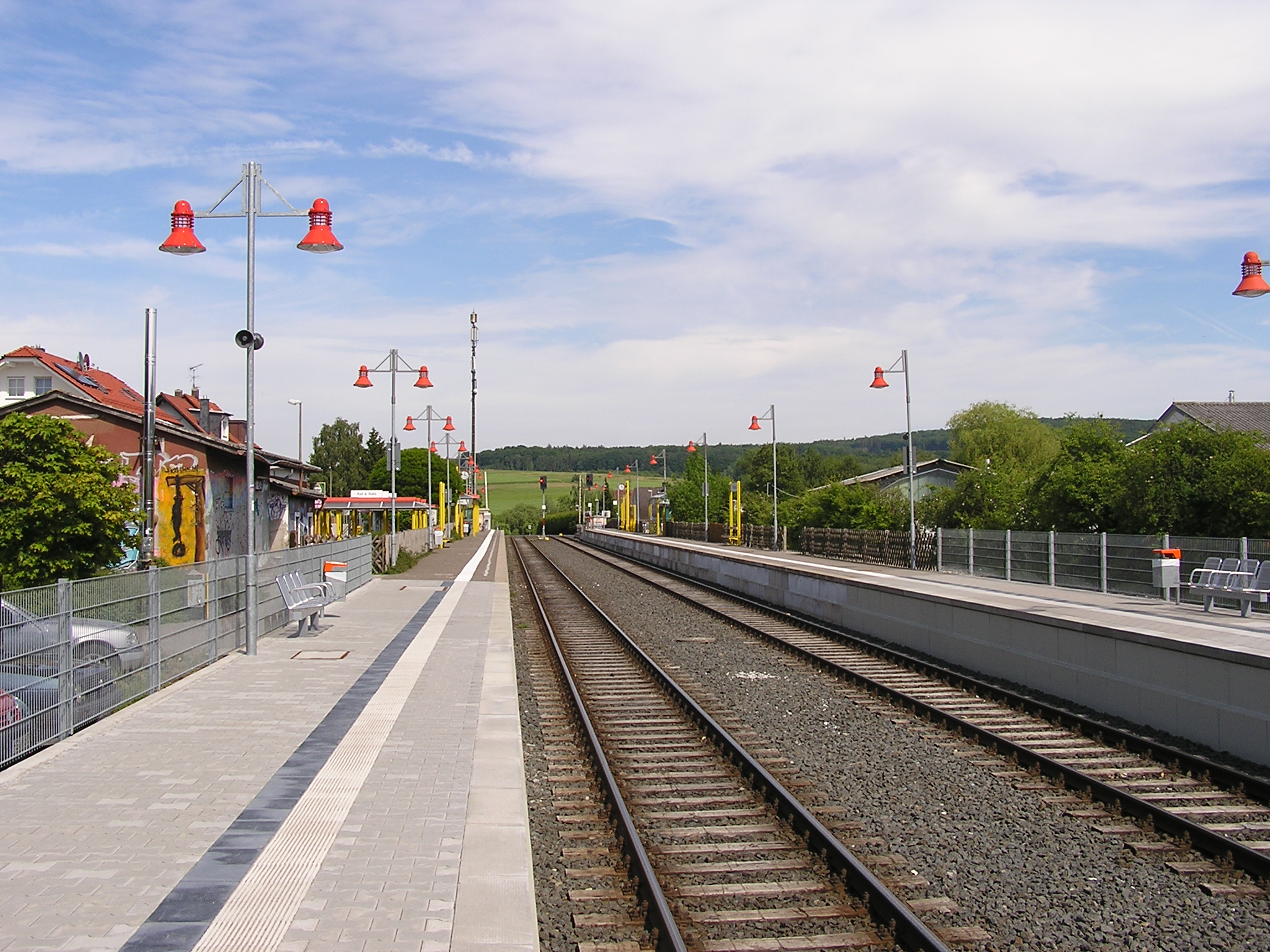
- View of the tracks and platforms

General information
- Location: Wehrheim, Hesse; Germany
- Coordinates: 50°17′47″N 8°34′00″E
- System: Through station
- Lines: Taunus Railway (km 9.2) (KBS 637)
- Platforms: 2

Other information
- Station code: n/a
- DS100 code: FWEH
- IBNR: 08007853
- Fare zone: : 5201

History
- Opened: 15 October 1895
Location
- Location within Hesse

Wehrheim station is the station of Wehrheim in the German state of Hesse. It is located on the Taunus Railway and the station building is heritage-listed.

== History ==
Stations of a standard type were built in Köppern, Anspach and Wehrheim for the Taunus Railway (Homburg–Usingen), which was opened on 15 October 1895. The Wehrheim station building at line-kilometre 9.2 is the only one of these buildings that has been preserved. It is an elongated brick building, consisting of the ticket hall, a dispatcher’s room connecting to the track and a goods shed. The building has been changed by the raising of the originally flat roof and the plaster has been changed significantly compared to its original state. While the station was built on a green field, both sides of the station are now surrounded by buildings.

The first stationmaster was Wilhelm Ernst. Boom barriers were installed in 1904 on the former Usingen–Bad Homburg district road (which formed part of federal road 456 until the construction of the Usingen–Bad Homburg bypass and is now called Bahnhofsstraße—meaning "station street") after an accident had occurred a few years earlier: a wagon had tried to cross the tracks quickly in front of a train. This failed and the driver and horse died. There was also an accident on Obernhainer Weg on the other side of the station on 28 June 1915: a cow-hauled wagon of the farmer Ludwig Bender was hit by a train and a cow died. This level crossing was later provided with flashing lights and then with half barriers in 1992.

After the Dahlerau train disaster, extension signals were retrofitted in Wehrheim and on many branch lines at the end of the 1970s. The entrance signals in Wehrheim were also replaced with branch-line colour light signals.

== Services ==
The single-track Taunus Railway has two platform tracks in the station. The trains of the Taunus Railway (RMV line 15) operate every half hour on weekdays, otherwise hourly. Basically, the tracks are used—even when there is no other train crossing—in directional mode: track 1 for trains to Usingen and track 2 for trains to Bad Homburg, although some non-crossing trains to Bad Homburg use track 1 because among other things it is more accessible for students.

The neighbouring stations are at Anspach and Saalburg (in the district of Saalburgsiedlung).
