= Neu-Anspach =

- Town
- Flag Coat of arms

- Location of Neu-Anspach within Hochtaunuskreis district
- Interactive map of Neu-Anspach
- Location within Germany Location within Hesse
- Coordinates: 50°17′35″N 08°30′32″E
- Country: Germany
- State: Hesse
- Admin. region: Darmstadt
- District: Hochtaunuskreis
- Subdivisions: 4 Stadtteile

Government
  - Mayor (2017–23): Thomas Pauli (SPD)

Area
  - Total: 36.12 km^{2} (13.95 sq mi)
- Elevation: 342 m (1,122 ft)

Population (2025-12-31)
  - Total: 14,302
  - Density: 396.0/km^{2} (1,026/sq mi)
- Time zone: UTC+01:00 (CET)
  - Summer (DST): UTC+02:00 (CEST)
- Postal codes: 61267
- Dialling codes: 06081
- Vehicle registration: HG, USI
- Website: www.neu-anspach.de

Neu-Anspach (German pronunciation: [nɔʏˈʔanspax]) is a town in the Hochtaunuskreis in Hesse, Germany.

== Geography ==
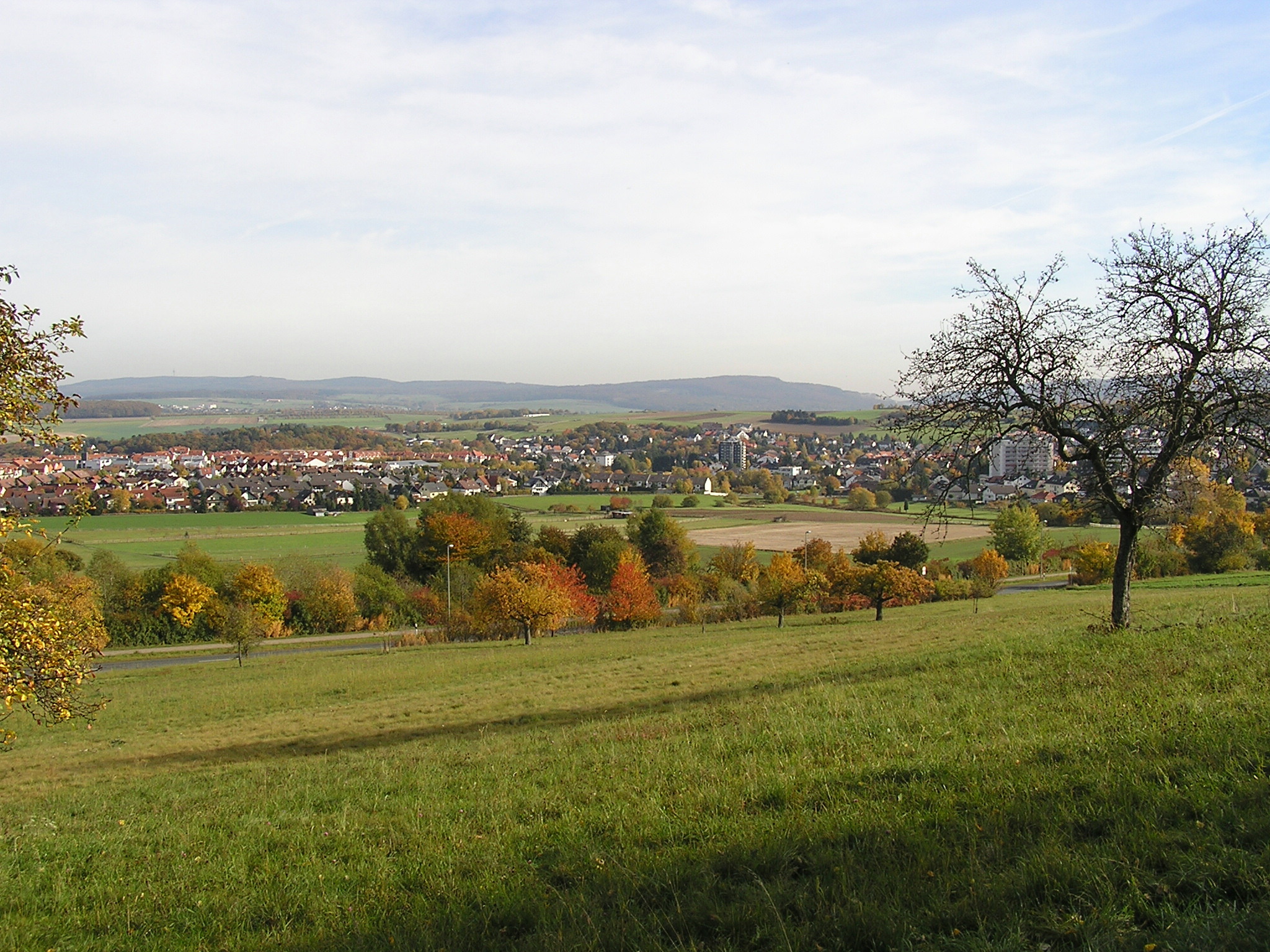
Neu-Anspach

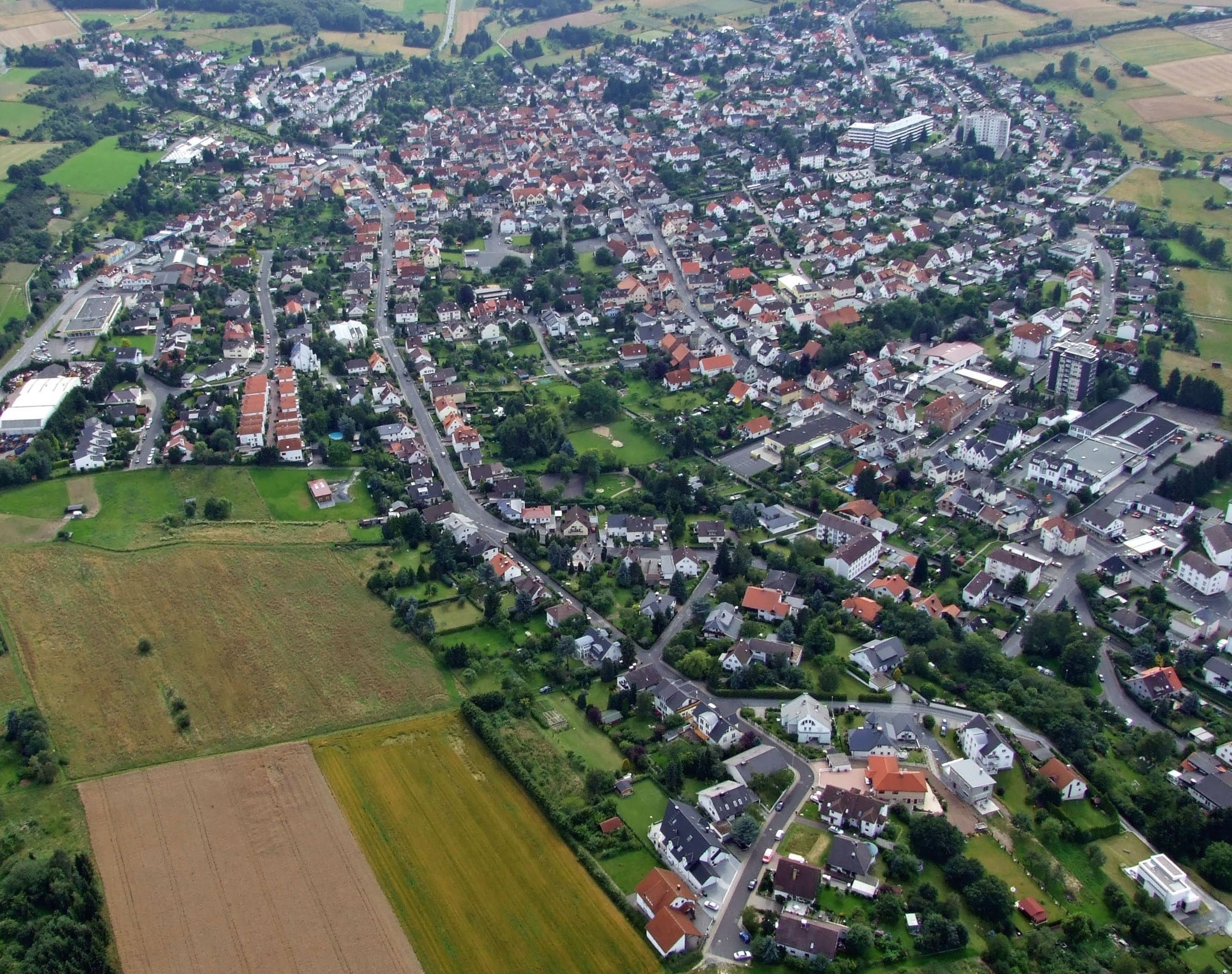
from above

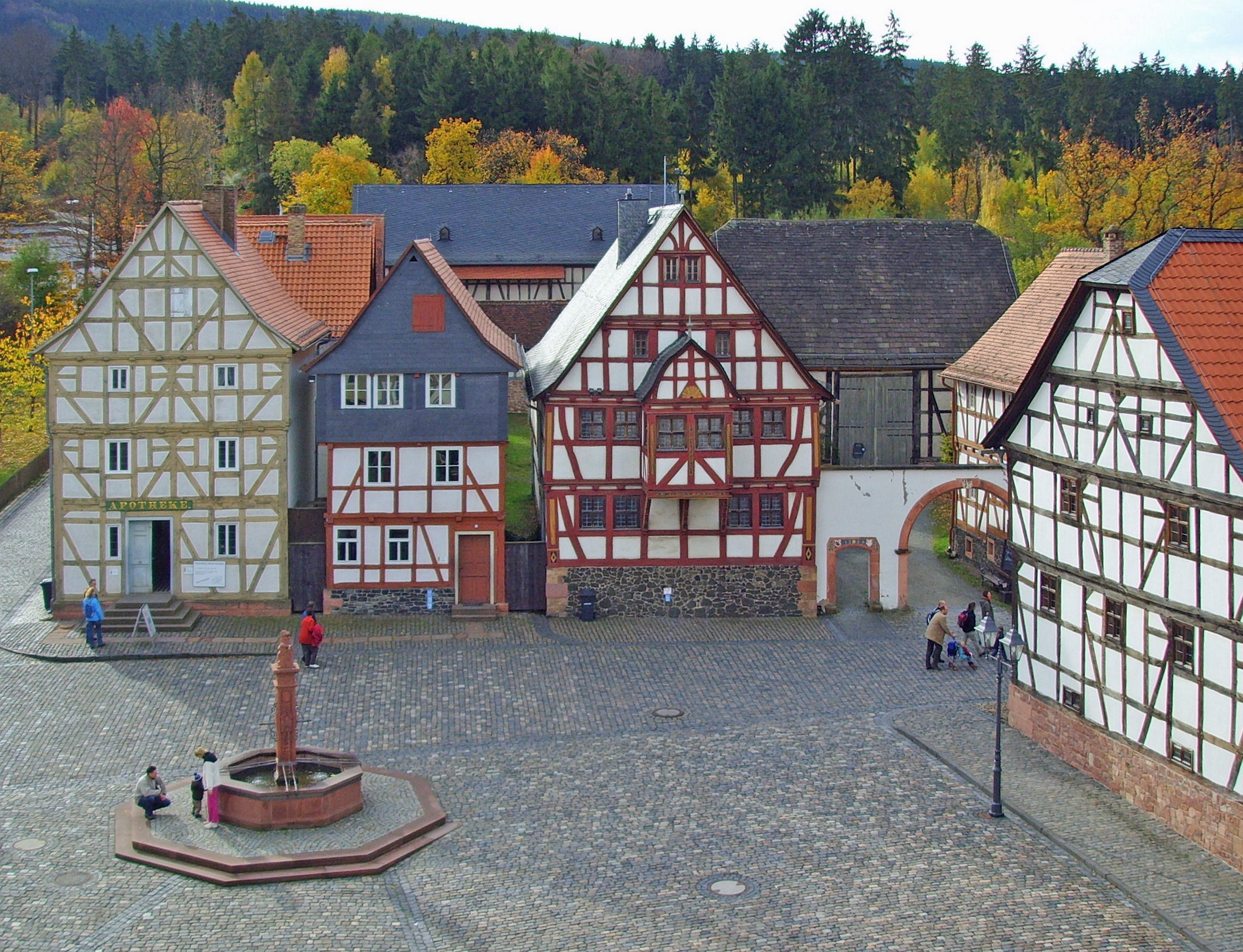
Market place located in Hessenpark

=== Neighbouring communities ===
Neu-Anspach borders in the north on the town of Usingen, in the east on the community of Wehrheim, in the south on the town of Bad Homburg and in the west on the community of Schmitten.

== Economy and infrastructure ==
=== Transport ===
The nearest Autobahn interchange on the A 661 is about 13 km from the community's centre. The interchange on the A 5 is about 15 km away, Bad Homburg about 12 km and Frankfurt International Airport about 35 km.

As for local public transport there are direct connections to Frankfurt am Main and Bad Homburg with the RMV (Rhein-Main-Verkehrsverbund or Rhine-Main Transport Network) line 15, known as the Taunusbahn. Moreover, there are buslines to Usingen and Königstein im Taunus.

Near Neu-Anspach lies the Anspach Airport.

== Educational institutions ==
In Neu-Anspach there is an integrated comprehensive school with a gymnasial upper level, the Adolf-Reichwein-Schule, as well as the primary school at the Hasenberg and the one on the Wiesenau.

Adolf-Reichwein-Schule takes part in a cultural exchange with Monroe High School located in Monroe, Wisconsin. This exchange takes place every other year with the German students going to Monroe in the fall of even numbered years, and the U.S. students going to Germany the following summer.

== Culture and sightseeing ==
The best known attractions are:

- the Hessenpark Open-Air Museum (Freilichtmuseum Hessenpark)
- the nearby Lochmühle Leisure Park (Freizeitpark Lochmühle)
- the Saalburg Roman Fort

== Mayors ==
- Fritz Jäger (1911–1918)
- Emil Becker (1918–1933)
- Rudolf Henrici (1933–1946)
- Heinrich Schneider (1946–1960)
- Rudolf Selzer (1960–1984)
- Heinz Born (1984–1991)
- Rudi Rübsamen (temporary) (1991–1993)
- Gerd Hillen (1993–2005)
- Klaus Hoffmann (2005–2017)
- Thomas Pauli (since 2017)
