= Platform display =

Device giving train passengers information

A platform display, destination display or train describer (British English) is supplementing the destination sign on arriving trains giving passengers an advance information. Historically they did only show the next destination and sometimes the type of train. In later usage they were replaced by passenger information display systems (PIDS) allowing for real-time passenger information.

The first railway stations had only a time table for passenger information. On larger stations the train porters would help passengers to board the correct train matching with their ticket. They were supervised by a station manager that would handle the security requirements for each departing train. The first help in that task was a bell to remind passengers to board the train in time which on smaller stations does also announce the next train. Different directions would then be called out on the platform. At the time that trains grew into mass transport systems this was not enough anymore. The train handling became optimized to allow for less than a minute from arrival to departure at a stop which triggered the usage of loudspeakers and platform displays. The mechanical types were not standardized and every station had its own range of facilities as they seemed useful.

A train describer is originally an additional apparatus at British railways that ensures that the identity of each train is displayed on the signalbox panel together with the indication of that train's presence, usually offering routing information. This routing information would then be passed through to the platform display for passenger information. Technically the train reporting number was pushed from one signal box to the next. A series of interconnected signal boxes form a train describer system (TDS) transferring train describer data to be shown on the respective signalbox panel in a train describer display. The electric relay interlocking boxes were later replaced by electronic control boards where the train indication is just a text element on the video display.

In a centralized electronic interlocking the current train location and identification is used to predict the arrival at the next stop allowing for countdown clocks for passenger information. The term passenger information display has widely replaced the term platform display as station design can include different types of information displays - like a departure board in the main hall, a shorter list in the tunnels and an announcement of the next train on each platform side - which all get their information from a central electronic railway control system. Additionally passenger information displays have come into use for bus and tram stops as well where the destination display equipment is technically similar.

== Gallery ==
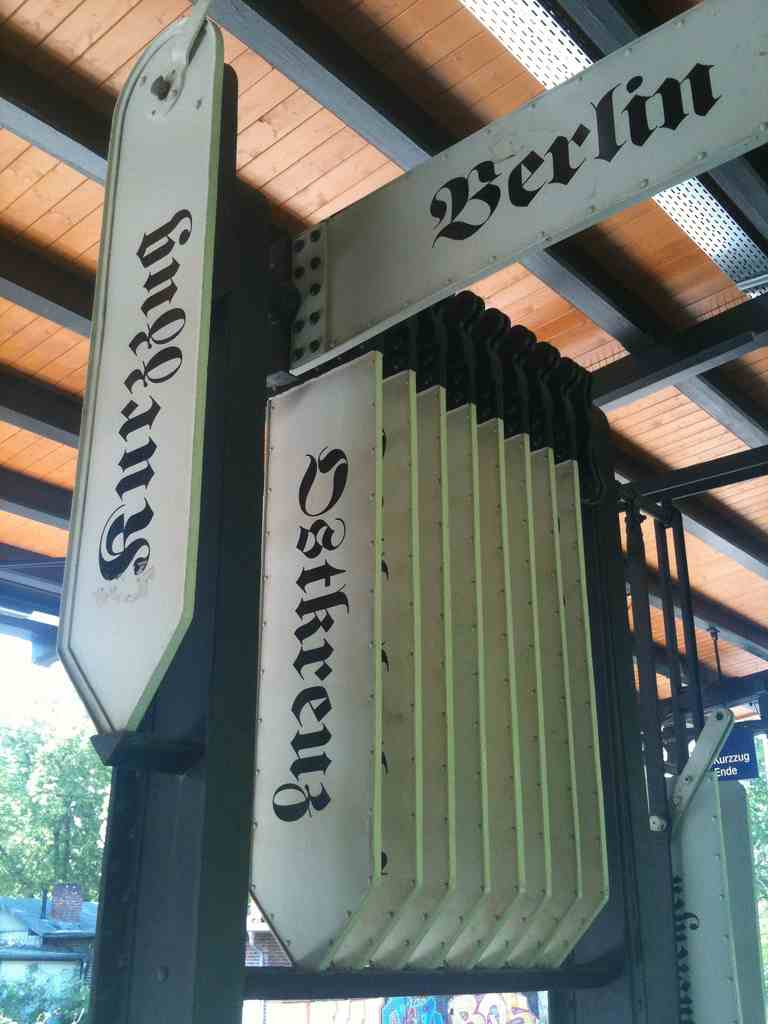
Mechanical platform display on a Berlin S-Bahn station from the 1900s, non-functional since installation of additional flap displays on the platform

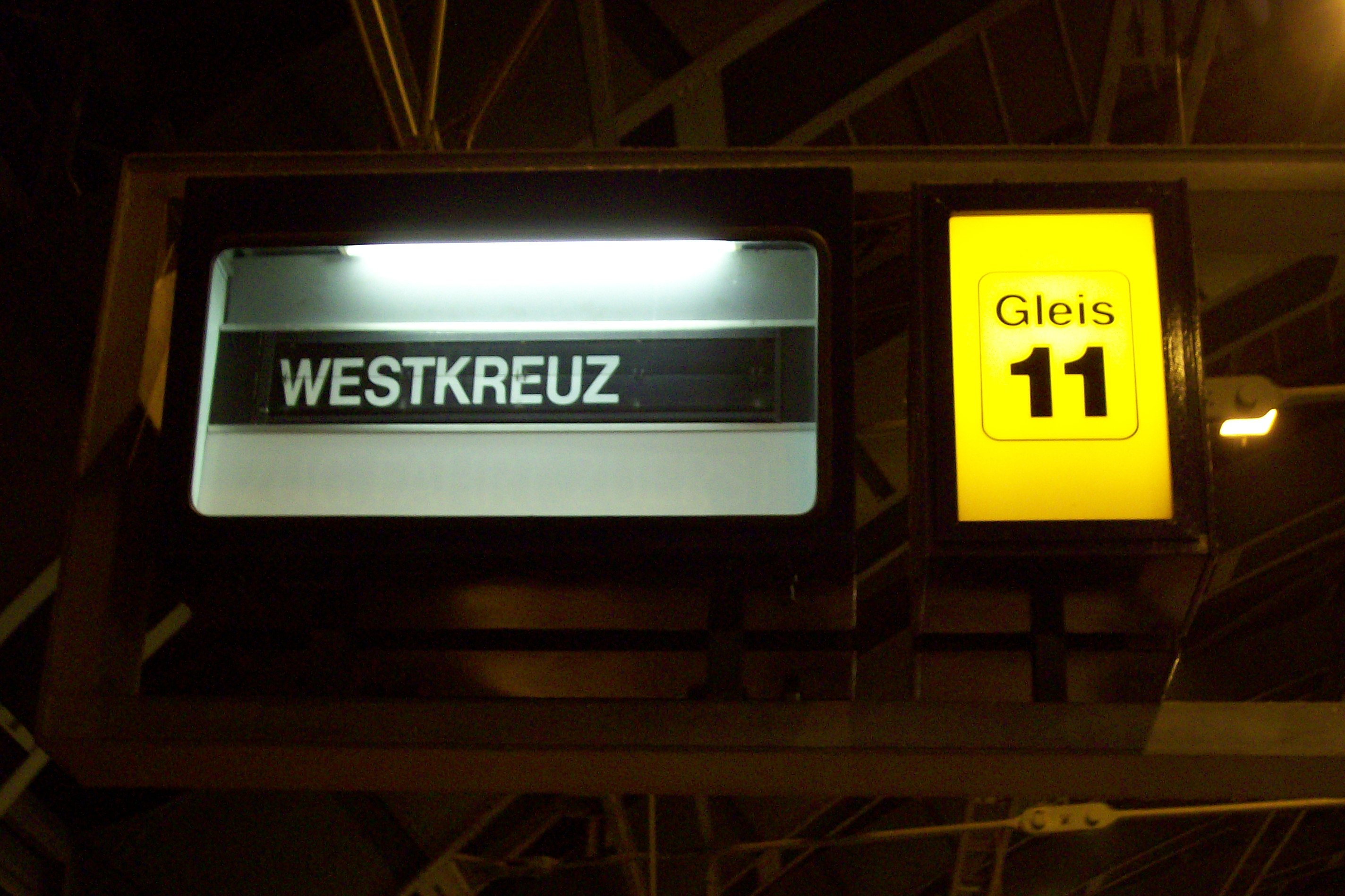
Flap display on the Berlin S-Bahn (mostly replaced by digital displays now)

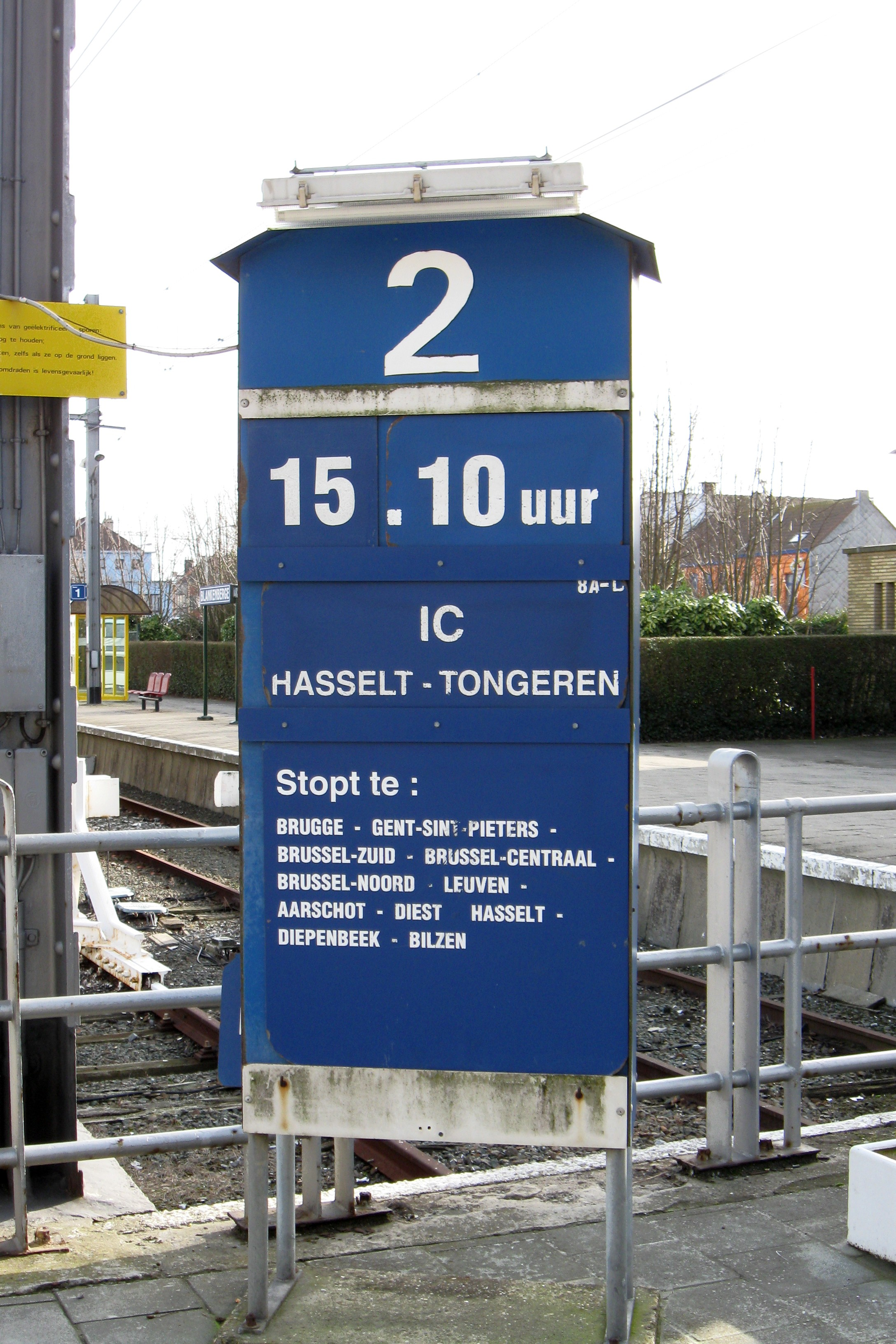
Simplest form of a train announcement posted on a platform in Belgium

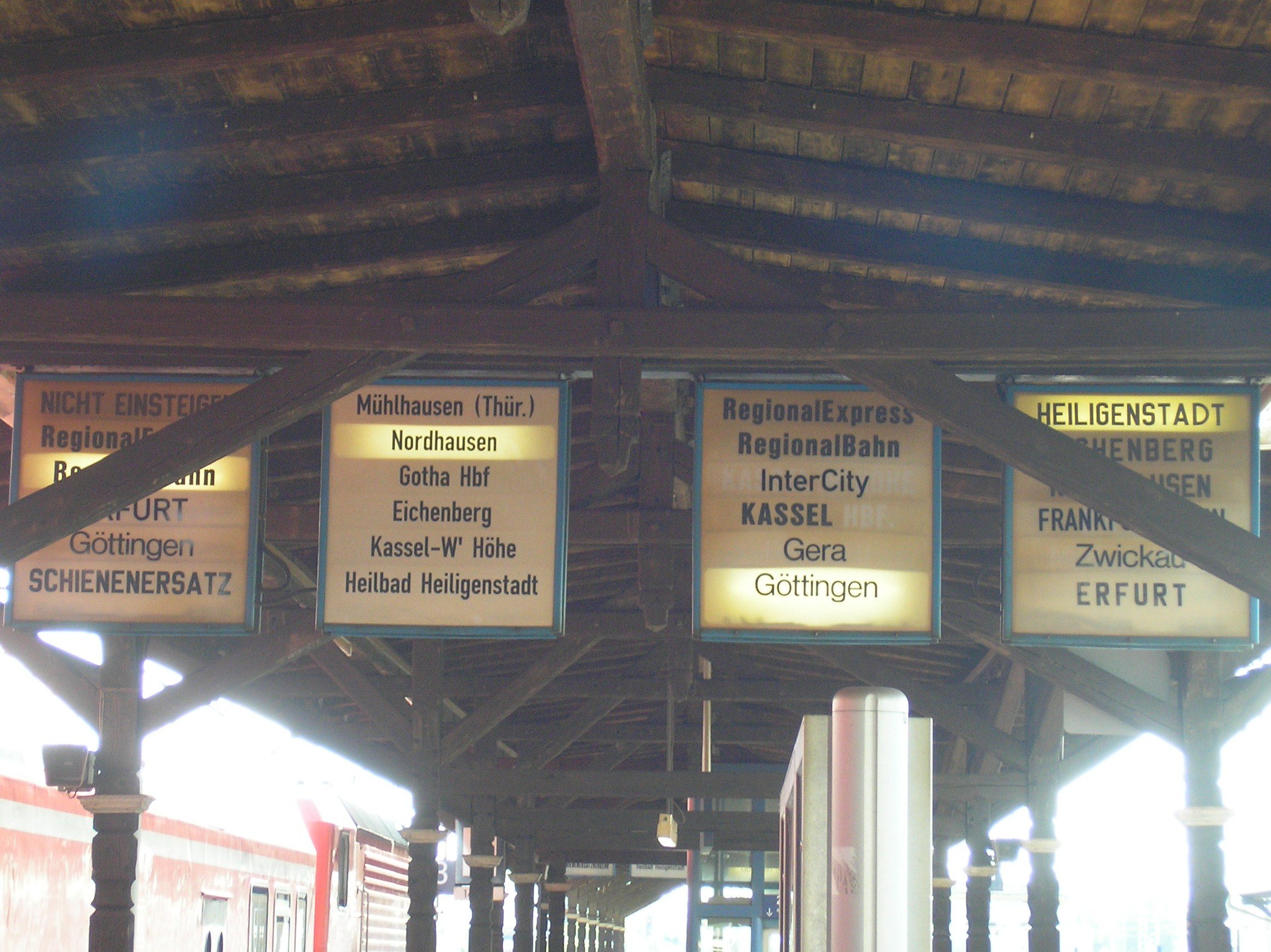
Platform display with an electric backlight for activation in Eastern Germany

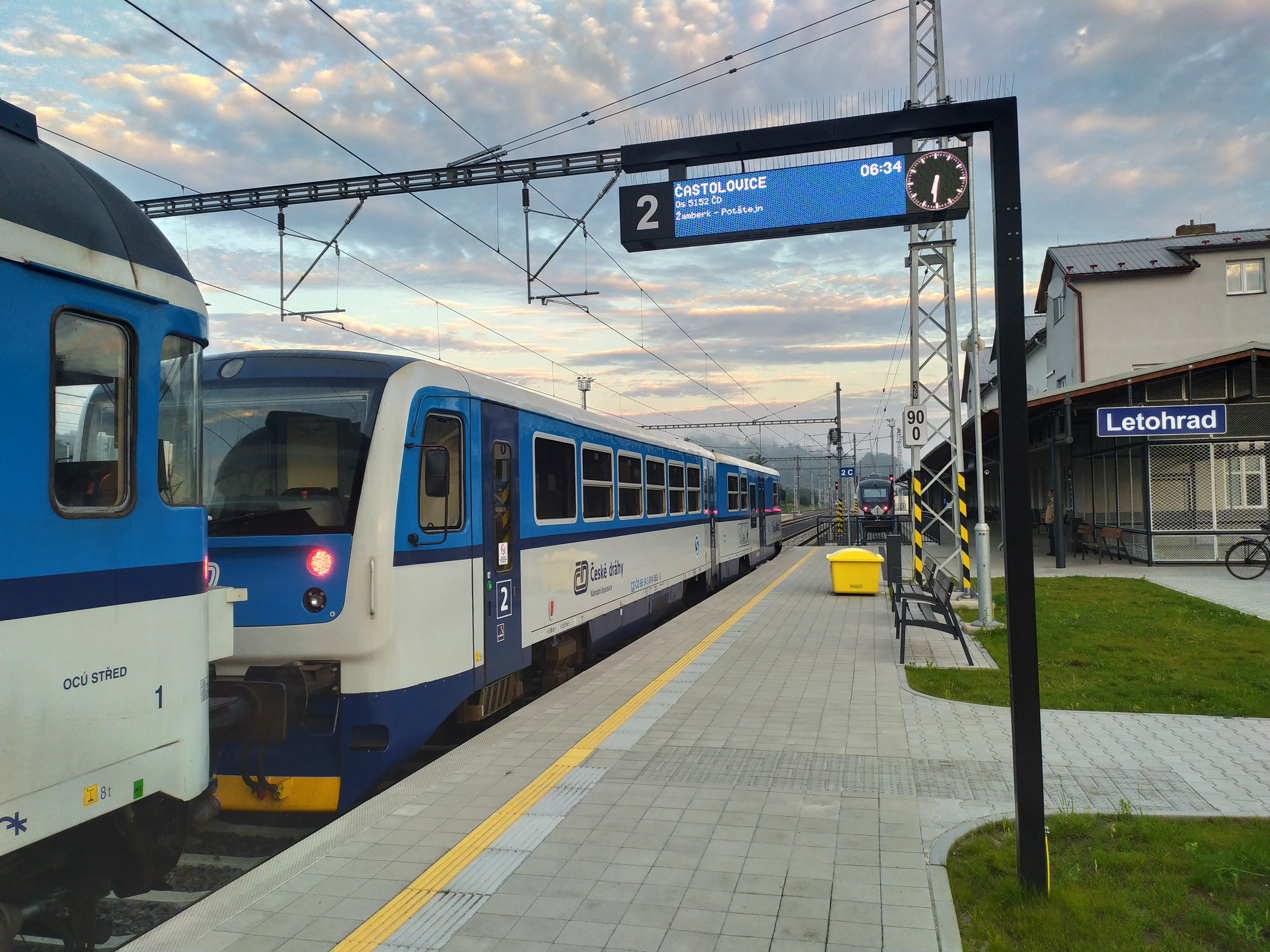
Czech LED-based display in Letohrad
