= Hochtaunuskreis =

Coordinates: 50°17′N 8°31′E

- District
- Flag Coat of arms
- Country: Germany
- State: Hesse
- Adm. region: Darmstadt
- Capital: Bad Homburg vor der Höhe

Government
  - District admin.: Ulrich Krebs (CDU)

Area
  - Total: 482.06 km^{2} (186.12 sq mi)

Population (31 December 2025)
  - Total: 241,730
  - Density: 501.45/km^{2} (1,298.8/sq mi)
- Time zone: UTC+01:00 (CET)
  - Summer (DST): UTC+02:00 (CEST)
- Vehicle registration: HG, USI
- Website: http://www.hochtaunuskreis.de

The Hochtaunuskreis is a Kreis (district) in the middle of Hesse, Germany and is part of the Frankfurt/Rhine-Main Metropolitan Region. Neighbouring districts are Lahn-Dill, Wetteraukreis, district-free Frankfurt, Main-Taunus-Kreis, Rheingau-Taunus-Kreis, Limburg-Weilburg.

The Hochtaunuskreis and the Landkreis Starnberg regularly compete for the title of the wealthiest district in Germany.

== History ==
The district was created in 1972 when the previous districts Obertaunus and Usingen were merged.

== Geography ==
Geographically it covers the Taunus mountains. The highest elevation of the Taunus, the 881 meter high Großer Feldberg, is in the district. Lowest elevation of the district with 130m is the village Ober Erlenbach. The wealthy towns in the district's densely populated southern part belong to the Frankfurt urban area.

== Coat of arms ==
The coat of arms is a dimidiation of the arms of the Obertaunus district in the left half and the Usingen district in the right half. It shows a lion, the left half in the red-white striped style of the Hesse lion, the right side the golden color lion of Nassau. Additionally in the left four bells which were taken from the counts of Kronberg, and in the right four trefoils from the coat of arms of the city of Usingen.

== Towns and municipalities ==
Clickable map of towns and municipalities in the district

Towns
1. Bad Homburg vor der Höhe
2. Friedrichsdorf
3. Königstein im Taunus
4. Kronberg im Taunus
5. Neu-Anspach
6. Oberursel (Taunus)
7. Steinbach (Taunus)
8. Usingen
Municipalities
1. Glashütten
2. Grävenwiesbach
3. Schmitten
4. Wehrheim
5. Weilrod

== Transport ==
Rhein-Main-Verkehrsverbund (RMV)

The district is located in the area of the transport association Rhein-Main-Verkehrsverbund (RMV).
