= List of railway stations in Hesse =

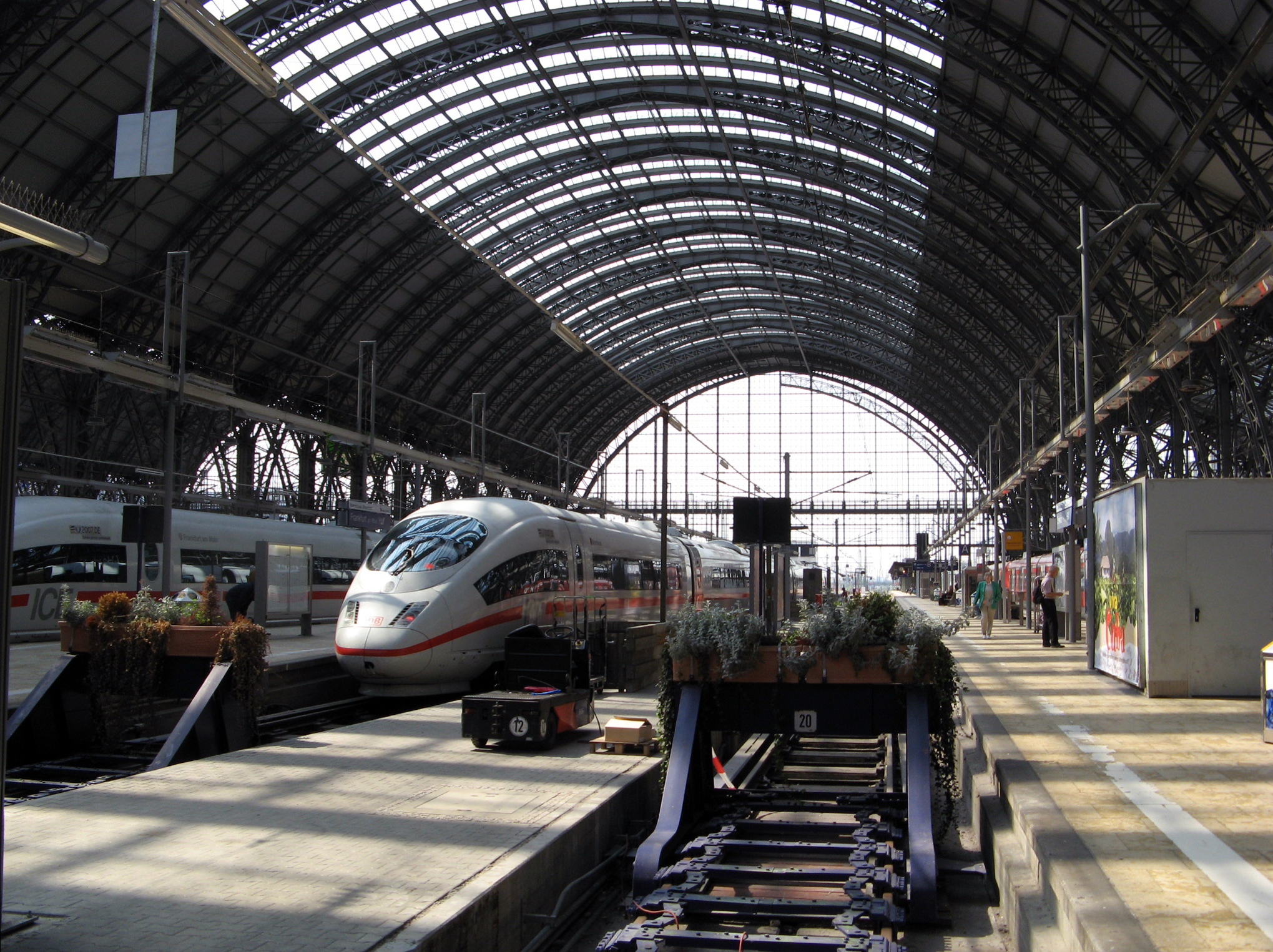
ICE 3 in Frankfurt Hauptbahnhof

This list covers all passenger railway stations and halts in the Hesse that are served by scheduled services.

== Description ==
- Station: current name of the station or halt.
- Type: Specifies the type of operating point, i.e. Station (Bf), station part (Bft) or Haltepunkt (a halt with no sets of points, Hp).
- Tracks: Specifies the number of platform tracks in-use.
- City/municipality: City, town or municipality of the station.
- County (Kreis): This columns gives the rural county or urban district in which the station is located. The abbreviations for these are given below and correspond to the German number plate scheme:

- Kreis Bergstraße (HP)
- Darmstadt and Landkreis Darmstadt-Dieburg (DA)
- Frankfurt am Main (F)
- Landkreis Fulda (FD)
- Landkreis Gießen (GI)
- Kreis Groß-Gerau (GG)
- Landkreis Hersfeld-Rotenburg (HEF)
- Hochtaunuskreis (HG)
- Kassel and Landkreis Kassel (KS)
- Lahn-Dill-Kreis (LDK)
- Landkreis Limburg-Weilburg (LM)
- Main-Kinzig-Kreis (MKK) with Hanau (HU)
- Main-Taunus-Kreis (MTK)
- Landkreis Marburg-Biedenkopf (MR)
- Odenwaldkreis (ERB)
- Offenbach am Main und Landkreis Offenbach (OF)
- Rheingau-Taunus-Kreis (RÜD)
- Schwalm-Eder-Kreis (HR)
- Vogelsbergkreis (VB)
- Landkreis Waldeck-Frankenberg (KB)
- Werra-Meißner-Kreis (ESW)
- Wetteraukreis (FB)
- Wiesbaden (WI)

- Opening: Specifies the opening period. The data refer to the initial opening of the station at its present location. Temporary closures or relocations are not included.
- TA: The stations of Hesse are integrated into three transport associations (Verkehrsverbünde): The northern part of the state is in the Nordhessischer Verkehrsverbund (North Hesse Transport Association, NVV), central Hesse in the Rhein-Main-Verkehrsverbundes (Rhine-Main Transport Association, RMV). The extreme south of the state belongs to the Verkehrsverbund Rhein-Neckar (Rhine-Neckar Transport Association, VRN). Fares that are located outside the core areas are shown in italics. This applies to the above three transport associations and the Rhine-Nahe-Nahverkehrsverbund (Rhine-Nahe Transport Association, RNN), the fares of which apply in Wiesbaden, also some statios are located in RMV area as well as in additional fare zones of the Verkehrsverbund Rhein-Mosel (VRM).
- Cat: The Cat column shows the current category of station as at 1 January 2018. This only applies to DB Station&Service stations and does not include stations run by private operators like the Hessische Landesbahn.
- L: Long-distance traffic stop; this is served by ICE, IC, EC, RJ, NJ, Flixtrain and TGV services
- R: Regional traffic stop; this is served by Regional-Express, Stadt-Express and Regionalbahn services of DB as well as similar services of private operators. A partial list of the lines found in the List of rail services of the Rhein-Main-Verkehrsverbund
  - S – Rhine-Main S-Bahn, Rhine-Neckar S-Bahn or RegioTram Kassel.
- Line – This column gives the railway on which the station is located. Only those routes which are still in operation are named.
- Remarks – In this column is additional information, particularly with regard to railway operators.

== Station overview ==
Station	Type	Tracks	City/ municipality	County	Opening	TA	Cat.	L	R	S	Line	Remarks
Ahnatal-Casselbreite	Hp	1	Ahnatal	KS	December 18, 2011	NVV				S	Volkmarsen–Vellmar	Regio-Netz Kurhessenbahn
Albshausen	Bf	2	Solms	LDK	January 10, 1863	RMV	5		R		Wetzlar–Koblenz	
Alheim-Heinebach	Bf	2	Alheim	HEF	August 29, 1848	NVV	6		R		Bebra–Kassel	
Allendorf (Dillkr)	Hp	1	Haiger	LDK		RMV	7		R		Betzdorf–Haiger	
Alsfeld (Oberhess)	Bf	3	Alsfeld	VB	July 29, 1870	RMV	5		R		Gießen–Fulda	
Altenfeld (Rhön)	Hp	1	Gersfeld (Rhön)	FD	October 1888	RMV	7		R		Fulda–Gersfeld	
Altenhasungen	Hp	1	Wolfhagen	KS		NVV				S	Volkmarsen–Vellmar	Regio-Netz Kurhessenbahn
Altenstadt (Hess)	Bf	2	Altenstadt	FB	October 1, 1905	RMV	6		R		Bad Vilbel–Glauburg-Stockheim	
Altenstadt-Höchst	Hp	1	Altenstadt	FB	October 1, 1905	RMV	6		R		Bad Vilbel–Glauburg-Stockheim	
Altenstadt-Lindheim	Hp	1	Altenstadt	FB	October 1, 1905	RMV	6		R		Bad Vilbel–Glauburg-Stockheim	
Altheim (Hess)	Hp	2	Münster	DA	November 15, 1858	RMV	6		R		Mainz–Aschaffenburg	
Angersbach	Hp	1	Wartenberg	VB	December 31, 1870	RMV	6		R		Gießen–Fulda	
Anzefahr	Hp	2	Kirchhain	MR		RMV; NVV	6		R		Kassel–Frankfurt	
Arfurt (Lahn)	Hp	2	Runkel	LM	October 14, 1862	RMV	6		R		Wetzlar–Koblenz	
Assenheim (Oberhess)	Bf	2	Niddatal	FB	September 15, 1881	RMV	6		R		Friedberg–Hanau	
Aßlar	Bf	2	Aßlar	LDK		RMV	6		R		Siegen–Gießen	
Assmannshausen	Bf	3	Rüdesheim am Rhein	RÜD	February 22, 1852	RMV	5		R		Köln–Wiesbaden	
Aumenau	Bf	2	Villmar	LM	January 10, 1863	RMV	6		R		Wetzlar–Koblenz	
Auringen-Medenbach	Hp	1	Wiesbaden	WI	July 1, 1879	RMV; RNN	6		R		Wiesbaden–Niedernhausen	
Babenhausen (Hess)	Bf	4	Babenhausen	DA	December 27, 1858	RMV	5		R		Hanau–Eberbach; Mainz–Aschaffenburg	
Babenhausen Langstadt	Hp	1	Babenhausen	DA		RMV	6		R		Hanau–Eberbach	
Bad Arolsen	Bf	2	Bad Arolsen	KB		NVV			R		Warburg–Sarnau	Regio-Netz Kurhessenbahn
Bad Camberg	Bf	2	Bad Camberg	LM	October 15, 1877	RMV	5		R		Frankfurt–Eschhofen	
Bad Hersfeld	Bf	5	Bad Hersfeld	HEF	January 22, 1866	NVV; RMV	3	L	R		Bebra–Fulda	
Bad Homburg	Bf	4	Bad Homburg v. d. Höhe	HG	October 26, 1907	RMV	3		R	S	Frankfurt–Friedrichsdorf	
Bad Karlshafen	Hp	1	Bad Karlshafen	KS	March 30, 1848	NVV	7		R		Ottbergen–Northeim	
Bad König	Bf	2	Bad König	ERB		RMV; VRN	6		R		Hanau–Eberbach	
Bad König-Zell	Bf	1	Bad König	ERB		RMV; VRN	7		R		Hanau–Eberbach	
Bad Nauheim	Bf	3	Bad Nauheim	FB	November 9, 1850	RMV	4		R		Kassel–Frankfurt	
Bad Salzhausen	Hp	1	Nidda	FB	about 1900	RMV	6		R		Beienheim–Schotten	
Bad Salzschlirf	Bf	2	Bad Salzschlirf	FD	December 31, 1870	RMV	6		R		Gießen–Fulda	
Bad Soden (Taunus)	Bf	2	Bad Soden am Taunus	MTK	May 22, 1847	RMV	5		R	S	Frankfurt–Bad Soden	
Bad Soden-Salmünster	Bf	3	Bad Soden-Salmünster	MKK		RMV	5		R		Fulda–Hanau	
Bad Sooden-Allendorf	Bf	2	Bad Sooden-Allendorf	ESW		NVV	6		R		Bebra–Göttingen	
Bad Vilbel	Bf	5	Bad Vilbel	FB	May 10, 1850	RMV	3		R	S	Bad Vilbel–Glauburg-Stockheim; Kassel–Frankfurt	
Bad Vilbel-Gronau	Hp	1	Bad Vilbel	FB		RMV	6		R		Bad Vilbel–Glauburg-Stockheim	
Bad Vilbel Süd	Hp	2	Bad Vilbel	FB		RMV	5			S	Kassel–Frankfurt	
Bad Wildungen	Bf	1	Bad Wildungen	KB	July 15, 1884	NVV			R		Wabern–Bad Wildungen	Regio-Netz Kurhessenbahn
Baunatal-Guntershausen	Bf	4	Baunatal	KS	September 25, 1849	NVV	5		R	S	Bebra–Kassel; Kassel–Frankfurt	
Baunatal-Rengershausen	Hp	2	Baunatal	KS		NVV	6			S	Bebra–Kassel; Kassel–Frankfurt	
Bebra	Bf	8	Bebra	HEF	August 29, 1848	NVV; RMV	3	L	R		Bebra–Göttingen; Bebra–Kassel; Halle–Bebra; Bebra–Fulda	
Beerfelden-Hetzbach	Hp	1	Beerfelden	ERB	March 1, 1882	RMV; VRN	6		R		Hanau–Eberbach	
Beienheim	Bf	3	Reichelsheim (Wetterau)	FB	October 1, 1897	RMV	5		R		Beienheim–Schotten; Friedberg–Mücke	
Bensheim	Bf	4	Bensheim	HP	June 22, 1846	VRN; RMV	4	L	R		Frankfurt–Heidelberg; Worms–Bensheim	
Bensheim-Auerbach	Bf	2	Bensheim	HP	1850	VRN; RMV	5		R		Frankfurt–Heidelberg	
Biblis	Bf	5	Biblis	HP	June 1, 1869	VRN; RMV	4		R		Mannheim–Frankfurt; Worms–Biblis	
Bickenbach (Bergstr)	Bf	3	Bickenbach	DA		RMV	5		R		Frankfurt–Heidelberg	
Biebesheim	Bf	3	Biebesheim am Rhein	GG		RMV	5		R		Mannheim–Frankfurt	
Biedenkopf	Bf	2	Biedenkopf	MR	March 19, 1883	RMV			R		Kreuztal–Cölbe	Regio-Netz Kurhessenbahn
Biedenkopf Schulzentrum	Hp	1	Biedenkopf	MR	August 31, 2003	RMV			R		Kreuztal–Cölbe	Regio-Netz Kurhessenbahn
Birkenau	Bf	2	Birkenau	HP		VRN; RMV	6		R		Weinheim–Fürth	
Birkenbringhausen	Hp	1	Burgwald	KB	July 1, 1890	NVV; RMV			R		Warburg–Sarnau	Regio-Netz Kurhessenbahn; relocated by 500 m in 2010
Bleichenbach (Oberhess)	Hp	1	Ortenberg	FB		RMV	7		R		Gießen–Gelnhausen	
Bobstadt	Hp	2	Bürstadt	HP		VRN; RMV	6		R		Mannheim–Frankfurt	
Borken (Hess)	Bf	3	Borken (Hessen)	HR		NVV	5		R	S	Kassel–Frankfurt	
Borsdorf (Hess)	Hp	1	Nidda	FB		RMV	6		R		Gießen–Gelnhausen	
Brandoberndorf	Hp	1	Waldsolms	LDK		RMV			R		Grävenwiesbach–Albshausen	EIU: VHT / EVU: HLB
Bruchenbrücken	Hp	2	Friedberg (Hessen)	FB		RMV	5			S	Kassel–Frankfurt	
Bruchköbel	Hp	2	Bruchköbel	MKK	October 15, 1881	RMV	6		R		Friedberg–Hanau	
Buchenau (Lahn)	Bf	2	Dautphetal	MR		RMV			R		Kreuztal–Cölbe	Regio-Netz Kurhessenbahn
Büches-Düdelsheim	Hp	1	Büdingen	FB		RMV	6		R		Gießen–Gelnhausen	
Büdingen (Oberhess)	Bf	2	Büdingen	FB	October 30, 1870	RMV	6		R		Gießen–Gelnhausen	
Burg (Dillkr) Nord	Hp	2	Herborn	LDK		RMV	6		R		Siegen–Gießen	
Burg- und Nieder Gemünden	Bf	1	Gemünden (Felda)	VB		RMV	6		R		Gießen–Fulda	
Bürgeln	Hp	2	Cölbe	MR		RMV; NVV	6		R		Kassel–Frankfurt	
Burghaun (Kr Hünfeld)	Bf	2	Burghaun	FD		RMV; NVV	6		R		Bebra–Fulda	
Burgholzhausen v d Höhe	Hp	1	Friedrichsdorf	HG		RMV	6		R		Friedberg–Friedrichsdorf	
Bürstadt	Hp	2	Bürstadt	HP		VRN; RMV	6		R		Worms–Bensheim	
Bürstadt (Ried)	Bf	2	Bürstadt	HP		VRN; RMV	5		R		Mannheim–Frankfurt	
Butzbach	Bf	3	Butzbach	FB	November 9, 1850	RMV	4		R		Kassel–Frankfurt	
Caldern	Hp	1	Lahntal	MR		RMV			R		Kreuztal–Cölbe	Regio-Netz Kurhessenbahn; request stop
Cölbe	Bf	4	Cölbe	MR	May 15, 1852	RMV; NVV	5		R		Kreuztal–Cölbe; Kassel–Frankfurt	
Darmstadt-Arheilgen	Bf	1	Darmstadt	DA	1885	RMV	6			S	Frankfurt–Heidelberg	
Darmstadt-Eberstadt	Bf	3	Darmstadt	DA		RMV	4		R		Darmstadt–Pfungstadt; Frankfurt–Heidelberg	
Darmstadt Hbf	Bf	11	Darmstadt	DA	1912	RMV	2	L	R	S	Darmstadt–Groß Umstadt; Frankfurt–Heidelberg; Mainz–Aschaffenburg	
Darmstadt-Kranichstein	Bf	2	Darmstadt	DA		RMV	6		R		Mainz–Aschaffenburg	
Darmstadt-Lichtwiese	Hp	1	Darmstadt	DA		RMV	6		R		Darmstadt–Groß Umstadt	
Darmstadt Nord	Bf	4	Darmstadt	DA	1912	RMV	5		R		Darmstadt–Groß Umstadt; Mainz–Aschaffenburg	
Darmstadt Ost	Bf	2	Darmstadt	DA	December 27, 1870	RMV	6		R		Darmstadt–Groß Umstadt	
Darmstadt Süd	Hp	2	Darmstadt	DA	1912	RMV	5		R		Frankfurt–Heidelberg	
Darmstadt-Wixhausen	Hp	1	Darmstadt	DA	1887	RMV	6			S	Frankfurt–Heidelberg	
Dieburg	Bf	5	Dieburg	DA	August 1, 1858	RMV	4		R		Mainz–Aschaffenburg; Offenbach–Reinheim	
Dietzenbach Bf	Hp Bft	1	Dietzenbach	OF		RMV	5			S	Offenbach–Dietzenbach	
Dietzenbach Mitte	Bf	2	Dietzenbach	OF		RMV	5			S	Offenbach–Dietzenbach	
Dietzenbach-Steinberg	Bft	2	Dietzenbach	OF		RMV	5			S	Offenbach–Dietzenbach	
Dillbrecht	Bf	2	Haiger	LDK	1910	RMV	6		R		Siegen–Gießen	
Dillenburg	Bf	5	Dillenburg	LDK		RMV	4		R		Siegen–Gießen	
Dorheim (Wetterau)	Bf	1	Friedberg (Hessen)	FB		RMV	6		R		Friedberg–Mücke	
Dortelweil	Hp	2	Bad Vilbel	FB		RMV	5			S	Kassel–Frankfurt	
Dreieich-Buchschlag	Bf	3	Dreieich	OF		RMV	4		R	S	Dreieich–Rödermark; Frankfurt–Heidelberg	
Dreieich-Dreieichenhain	Hp	1	Dreieich	OF		RMV	6		R		Dreieich–Rödermark	
Dreieich-Götzenhain	Bf	2	Dreieich	OF		RMV	6		R		Dreieich–Rödermark	
Dreieich-Offenthal	Hp	1	Dreieich	OF		RMV	6		R		Dreieich–Rödermark	
Dreieich-Sprendlingen	Bf	2	Dreieich	OF		RMV	6		R		Dreieich–Rödermark	
Dreieich-Weibelfeld	Hp	1	Dreieich	OF		RMV	6		R		Dreieich–Rödermark	
Dutenhofen (Kr Wetzlar)	Bf	2	Wetzlar	LDK		RMV	6		R		Siegen–Gießen; Wetzlar–Koblenz	
Echzell	Bf	2	Echzell	FB		RMV	6		R		Beienheim–Schotten	
Eddersheim	Hp	2	Hattersheim am Main	MTK		RMV	5			S	Frankfurt–Wiesbaden	
Ederbringhausen	Hp	1	Vöhl	KB		NVV			R		Warburg–Sarnau	Regio-Netz Kurhessenbahn; operates only in the summer months
Edermünde-Grifte	Bf	3	Edermünde	HR		NVV	6			S	Kassel–Frankfurt	
Edingen (Kr Wetzlar)	Hp	2	Sinn	LDK		RMV	6		R		Siegen–Gießen	
Effolderbach	Hp	1	Ortenberg	FB		RMV	7		R		Gießen–Gelnhausen	
Egelsbach	Hp	2	Egelsbach	OF	1873	RMV	5			S	Frankfurt–Heidelberg	
Ehringen	Hp	1	Volkmarsen	KB		NVV			R		Volkmarsen–Vellmar	Regio-Netz Kurhessenbahn; request stop
Ehringshausen (Kr Wetzlar)	Bf	2	Ehringshausen	LDK		RMV	6		R		Siegen–Gießen	
Ehringshausen (Oberhess)	Bf	2	Gemünden (Felda)	VB		RMV	6		R		Gießen–Fulda	
Eichenberg	Bf	7	Neu-Eichenberg	ESW		NVV	4		R		Bebra–Göttingen; Halle–Kassel	
Eichenzell	Hp	1	Eichenzell	FD		RMV	6		R		Fulda–Gersfeld	
Eltville	Bf	3	Eltville am Rhein	RÜD		RMV	5		R		Köln–Wiesbaden	
Elz (Kr Limburg/Lahn)	Hp	1	Elz	LM		RMV VRM	6		R		Limburg–Altenkirchen	
Elz (Kr Limburg/Lahn) Süd	Hp	1	Elz	LM		RMV VRM	7		R		Limburg–Siershahn	
Eppertshausen	Hp	1	Eppertshausen	DA		RMV	6		R		Offenbach–Reinheim	
Eppstein	Bf	2	Eppstein	MTK	October 15, 1877	RMV	4			S	Frankfurt–Eschhofen	
Eppstein-Bremthal	Hp	2	Eppstein	MTK		RMV	5			S	Frankfurt–Eschhofen	
Erbach (Odenw)	Bf	2	Erbach	ERB	December 24, 1871	RMV; VRN	6		R		Hanau–Eberbach	
Erbach (Odenw) Nord	Hp	1	Erbach	ERB		RMV; VRN	6		R		Hanau–Eberbach	
Erbach (Rheingau)	Hp	2	Eltville am Rhein	RÜD		RMV	6		R		Köln–Wiesbaden	
Ernsthausen (Kr Frankenberg)	Hp	1	Burgwald	KB		NVV; RMV			R		Warburg–Sarnau	Regio-Netz Kurhessenbahn
Erzhausen	Bf	2	Erzhausen	DA	1888	RMV	4			S	Frankfurt–Heidelberg	
Eschborn	Bf	2	Eschborn	MTK	August 19, 1874	RMV	5			S	Frankfurt–Kronberg	
Eschborn Süd	Hp	2	Eschborn	MTK	1978	RMV	5			S	Frankfurt–Kronberg	
Eschhofen	Bf	3	Limburg a. d. Lahn	LM		RMV	5		R		Frankfurt–Eschhofen; Wetzlar–Koblenz	
Eschwege-Niederhone	Hp	1	Eschwege	ESW	December 13, 2009	NVV			R		Leinefelde–Treysa	
Eschwege	Bf	2	Eschwege	ESW	December 13, 2009	NVV			R		Leinefelde–Treysa	
Espenau-Mönchehof	Bf	2	Espenau	KS		NVV	6		R	S	Warburg–Kassel	
Felsberg-Altenbrunslar	Hp	2	Felsberg	HR	December 29, 1849	NVV	6			S	Kassel–Frankfurt	
Felsberg-Gensungen	Bf	2	Felsberg	HR		NVV	6		R	S	Kassel–Frankfurt	
Felsberg-Wolfershausen	Hp	2	Felsberg	HR		NVV	6			S	Kassel–Frankfurt	
Flieden	Bf	4	Flieden	FD	December 15, 1868	RMV	5		R		Flieden–Gemünden; Fulda–Hanau	
Flörsheim (Main)	Bf	3	Flörsheim am Main	MTK	April 13, 1840	RMV	4			S	Frankfurt–Wiesbaden	
Frankenberg (Eder)	Bf	2	Frankenberg (Eder)	KB	July 1, 1890	NVV; RMV			R		Warburg–Sarnau	Regio-Netz Kurhessenbahn
Frankfurt-Berkersheim	Hp	2	Frankfurt am Main	F	May 10, 1850	RMV	5			S	Kassel–Frankfurt	
Frankfurt-Eschersheim	Hp	2	Frankfurt am Main	F	May 10, 1850	RMV	5			S	Kassel–Frankfurt	
Frankfurt-Frankfurter Berg	Bf	3	Frankfurt am Main	F	May 10, 1850	RMV	4			S	Kassel–Frankfurt	
Frankfurt Airport LD station	Bf	4	Frankfurt am Main	F	May 30, 1999	RMV	3	L			Köln–Frankfurt HSL	
Frankfurt Airport regional station	Bf	3	Frankfurt am Main	F	March 14, 1972	RMV	3		R	S	Frankfurt Airport loop	
Frankfurt (Main) Galluswarte	Bf	2	Frankfurt am Main	F	May 28, 1978	RMV	4			S	Frankfurt–Friedrichsdorf; Kassel–Frankfurt	
Frankfurt-Griesheim	Bf	3	Frankfurt am Main	F	October 15, 1877	RMV	4			S	Frankfurt–Eschhofen	
Frankfurt (Main) Hbf	Bf	29	Frankfurt am Main	F	August 18, 1888	RMV	1	L	R	S	Frankfurt City Tunnel; Hanau–Frankfurt; Frankfurt–Friedrichsdorf; Frankfurt–Heidelberg; Kassel–Frankfurt; Frankfurt–Eschhofen; Frankfurt–Wiesbaden; Mainz–Frankfurt; Mannheim–Frankfurt	
Frankfurt (Main) Hauptwache	Bf	2	Frankfurt am Main	F	May 28, 1978	RMV	3			S	Frankfurt City Tunnel	
Frankfurt (Main) Höchst	Bf	10	Frankfurt am Main	F	September 26, 1839	RMV	3		R	S	Frankfurt–Bad Soden; Frankfurt–Eschhofen; Frankfurt–Königstein; Frankfurt–Wiesbaden	
Frankfurt-Höchst Farbwerke	Hp Bft	2	Frankfurt am Main	F	1967	RMV	5		R	S	Frankfurt–Eschhofen; Frankfurt–Wiesbaden	
Frankfurt (Main) Konstablerwache	Bf	2	Frankfurt am Main	F	1983	RMV	3			S	Frankfurt City Tunnel	
Frankfurt Lokalbahnhof	Bf	2	Frankfurt am Main	F	1990	RMV	4			S	Frankfurt City Tunnel	
Frankfurt-Louisa	Bf	2	Frankfurt am Main	F	May 15, 1877	RMV	4			S	Frankfurt–Heidelberg	
Frankfurt-Mainkur	Bf	2	Frankfurt am Main	F	November 10, 1848	RMV	5		R		Frankfurt–Hanau	
Frankfurt am Main Messe	Hp	2	Frankfurt am Main	F	1999	RMV	4			S	Frankfurt–Friedrichsdorf; Kassel–Frankfurt	
Frankfurt (Main) Mühlberg	Bf	2	Frankfurt am Main	F	1992	RMV	4			S	Frankfurt City Tunnel	
Frankfurt-Nied	Hp	2	Frankfurt am Main	F	1888	RMV	5			S	Frankfurt–Eschhofen	
Frankfurt-Niederrad	Bf	4	Frankfurt am Main	F	1977	RMV	3		R	S	Mainz–Frankfurt; Mannheim–Frankfurt	
Frankfurt (Main) Ost	Bf	2	Frankfurt am Main	F	May 1, 1913	RMV	5		R		Frankfurt–Hanau	
Frankfurt (Main) Ostendstraße	Bf	2	Frankfurt am Main	F	1990	RMV	3			S	Frankfurt City Tunnel	
Frankfurt-Rödelheim	Bf	3	Frankfurt am Main	F	September 10, 1860	RMV	3		R	S	Frankfurt–Friedrichsdorf; Frankfurt–Kronberg	
Frankfurt-Sindlingen	Hp	2	Frankfurt am Main	F	1893	RMV	5			S	Frankfurt–Wiesbaden	
Frankfurt-Sossenheim	Hp	1	Frankfurt am Main	F		RMV	6		R		Frankfurt–Bad Soden	
Frankfurt am Main Stadion	Bf	6	Frankfurt am Main	F		RMV	3		R	S	Frankfurt Airport loop Mainz–Frankfurt; Mannheim–Frankfurt (SFS Köln–Frankfurt)	
Frankfurt (Main) Stresemannallee	Hp	2	Frankfurt am Main	F	1990	RMV	4			S	Hanau–Frankfurt	
Frankfurt (Main) Süd	Bf	9	Frankfurt am Main	F	November 15, 1873	RMV	2	L	R	S	Hanau–Frankfurt; Frankfurt–Hanau; Frankfurt Stadion–Frankfurt Süd; Frankfurt City Tunnel	formerly: Sachsenhausen
Frankfurt (Main) Taunusanlage	Bf	2	Frankfurt am Main	F	May 28, 1978	RMV	3			S	Frankfurt City Tunnel	
Frankfurt-Unterliederbach	Hp	1	Frankfurt am Main	F	February 24, 1902	RMV			R		Frankfurt–Königstein	EIU + EVU: HLB
Frankfurt (Main) West	Bf	5	Frankfurt am Main	F	May 10, 1850	RMV	3	L	R	S	Frankfurt–Friedrichsdorf; Kassel–Frankfurt	
Frankfurt-Zeilsheim	Hp	2	Frankfurt am Main	F	May 13, 2007	RMV	5			S	Frankfurt–Eschhofen	
Frickhofen	Bf	1	Dornburg	LM	October 1, 1886	RMV VRM	6		R		Limburg–Altenkirchen	
Friedberg (Hess)	Bf	10	Friedberg (Hessen)	FB	May 10, 1850	RMV	3	L	R	S	Kassel–Frankfurt; Friedberg–Hanau; Friedberg–Mücke; Friedberg–Friedrichsdorf	
Friedberg Süd	Hp	1	Friedberg (Hessen)	FB		RMV	7		R		Friedberg–Friedrichsdorf	
Friedelhausen	Hp	2	Lollar	GI		RMV	6		R		Kassel–Frankfurt	
Friedensdorf (Lahn)	Bf	2	Dautphetal	MR	March 19, 1883	RMV			R		Kreuztal–Cölbe	Regio-Netz Kurhessenbahn
Friedrichsdorf (Taunus)	Bf	4	Friedrichsdorf	HG	October 15, 1895	RMV	4		R	S	Frankfurt–Friedrichsdorf; Friedberg–Friedrichsdorf; Friedrichsdorf–Grävenwiesbach	
Fritzlar	Bf	2	Fritzlar	HR	July 15, 1884	NVV			R		Wabern–Bad Wildungen	Regio-Netz Kurhessenbahn
Fronhausen (Lahn)	Bf	2	Fronhausen	MR		RMV	6		R		Kassel–Frankfurt	
Fulda	Bf	10	Fulda	FD	October 1, 1866	RMV; NVV	2	L	R		Hanover–Würzburg HSR; Fulda–Hanau; Bebra–Fulda; Gießen–Fulda	
Fuldatal-Ihringshausen	Bf	2	Fuldatal	KS		NVV	6		R		Halle–Kassel	
Fürfurt	Hp	2	Weinbach	LM		RMV	6		R		Wetzlar–Koblenz	
Fürstenwald	Hp	1	Calden	KS		NVV				S	Volkmarsen–Vellmar	Regio-Netz Kurhessenbahn
Fürth (Odenw)	Hp	1	Fürth	HP	July 1, 1895	VRN; RMV	6		R		Weinheim–Fürth	
Garbenteich	Hp	1	Pohlheim	GI		RMV	6		R		Gießen–Gelnhausen	
Geisenheim	Bf	2	Geisenheim	RÜD		RMV	5		R		Köln–Wiesbaden	
Gelnhausen	Bf	4	Gelnhausen	MKK	May 1, 1867	RMV	4		R		Fulda–Hanau; Gießen–Gelnhausen	
Gernsheim	Bf	3	Gernsheim	GG	April 15, 1869	RMV	5		R		Mannheim–Frankfurt	
Gersfeld (Rhön)	Hp	1	Gersfeld (Rhön)	FD	October 1888	RMV	6		R		Fulda–Gersfeld	
Gertenbach	Hp	2	Witzenhausen	ESW		NVV	6		R		Halle–Kassel	
Gettenau-Bingenheim	Hp	1	Echzell	FB		RMV	6		R		Beienheim–Schotten	
Gießen	Bf	11	Gießen	GI	August 25, 1850	RMV	2	L	R		Kassel–Frankfurt; Gießen–Fulda; Gießen–Gelnhausen; Siegen–Gießen	
Gießen Erdkauter Weg	Hp	1	Gießen	GI		RMV	6		R		Gießen–Gelnhausen	
Gießen Licher Straße	Hp	1	Gießen	GI		RMV	6		R		Gießen–Fulda	
Gießen Oswaldsgarten	Hp	2	Gießen	GI	2004	RMV	5		R		Kassel–Frankfurt	
Glauburg-Glauberg	Hp	1	Glauburg	FB		RMV	6		R		Bad Vilbel–Glauburg-Stockheim	
Glauburg-Stockheim	Bf	3	Glauburg	FB	October 30, 1870	RMV	5		R		Bad Vilbel–Glauburg-Stockheim; Gießen–Gelnhausen	
Göbelnrod	Hp	1	Grünberg	GI	July 1, 1908	RMV	7		R		Gießen–Fulda	
Goßfelden	Hp	1	Lahntal	MR		RMV			R		Kreuztal–Cölbe	Regio-Netz Kurhessenbahn
Gräveneck	Hp	2	Weinbach	LM		RMV	6		R		Wetzlar–Koblenz	
Grävenwiesbach	Bf	3	Grävenwiesbach	HG	June 1, 1909	RMV			R		Friedrichsdorf–Grävenwiesbach; Grävenwiesbach–Albshausen	EIU: VHT / EVU: HLB
Grebenstein	Bf	3	Grebenstein	KS	March 30, 1848	NVV	5		R	S	Warburg–Kassel	
Groß Gerau	Bf	3	Groß-Gerau	GG	August 1, 1858	RMV	4		R		Mainz–Aschaffenburg	
Groß Gerau-Dornberg	Bf	5	Groß-Gerau	GG		RMV	3		R	S	Mannheim–Frankfurt	
Groß Gerau-Dornheim	Hp	2	Groß-Gerau	GG		RMV	6			S	Mannheim–Frankfurt	
Groß Karben	Bf	3	Karben	FB		RMV	4			S	Kassel–Frankfurt	
Groß Rohrheim	Bf	3	Groß-Rohrheim	HP		VRN; RMV	5		R		Mannheim–Frankfurt	
Groß Umstadt-Klein Umstadt	Hp	1	Groß-Umstadt	DA		RMV	6		R		Hanau–Eberbach	
Groß Umstadt Mitte	Bf	2	Groß-Umstadt	DA	June 29, 1870	RMV	6		R		Hanau–Eberbach	
Groß Umstadt-Wiebelsbach	Bf	4	Groß-Umstadt	DA	December 27, 1870	RMV	5		R		Darmstadt–Groß Umstadt; Hanau–Eberbach	
Großauheim (Kr Hanau)	Hp	2	Hanau	HU	July 22, 1854	RMV	6		R		Würzburg–Hanau	
Großen Buseck	Bf	2	Buseck	GI		RMV	6		R		Gießen–Fulda	
Großen Linden	Bf	2	Linden	GI	May 15, 1852	RMV	5		R		Kassel–Frankfurt	
Großenlüder	Bf	2	Großenlüder	FD		RMV	6		R		Gießen–Fulda	
Großkrotzenburg	Bf	2	Großkrotzenburg	MKK		RMV	5		R		Würzburg–Hanau	
Grünberg (Oberhess)	Bf	2	Grünberg	GI	December 29, 1869	RMV	6		R		Gießen–Fulda	
Guxhagen	Bf	2	Guxhagen	HR	August 29, 1848	NVV	5		R	S	Bebra–Kassel	
Hadamar	Bf	2	Hadamar	LM	January 1, 1870	RMV VRM	6		R		Limburg–Altenkirchen	
Hähnlein-Alsbach	Hp	2	Alsbach-Hähnlein	DA		RMV	5		R		Frankfurt–Heidelberg	
Haiger	Bf	3	Haiger	LDK	January 12, 1862	RMV	5		R		Betzdorf–Haiger; Siegen–Gießen	
Haiger Obertor	Hp Bft	1	Haiger	LDK		RMV	7		R		Betzdorf–Haiger	
Hailer-Meerholz	Bf	3	Gelnhausen	MKK		RMV	5		R		Fulda–Hanau	
Hainburg Hainstadt	Bf	2	Hainburg	OF	May 1, 1882	RMV	6		R		Hanau–Eberbach	
Haitz-Höchst	Hp	2	Gelnhausen	MKK		RMV	6		R		Fulda–Hanau	
Hanau Hbf	Bf	11	Hanau	HU	June 22, 1854	RMV	2	L	R	S	Fulda–Hanau; Frankfurt–Hanau; Hanau–Frankfurt; Friedberg–Hanau; Hanau–Eberbach; Würzburg–Hanau	formerly: Hanau Ost
Hanau-Klein Auheim	Hp	1	Hanau	HU	1882	RMV	6		R		Hanau–Eberbach	
Hanau Nord	Bf	2	Hanau	HU	1879	RMV	5		R		Friedberg–Hanau	
Hanau West	Hp	2	Hanau	HU	September 10, 1848	RMV	5		R		Frankfurt–Hanau	
Hanau-Wilhelmsbad	Hp	2	Hanau	HU	September 10, 1848	RMV	5		R		Frankfurt–Hanau	
Hasselborn (Kr Wetzlar)	Hp	1	Waldsolms	LDK	November 1, 1912	RMV			R		Grävenwiesbach–Albshausen	EIU: VHT / EVU: HLB
Hattenheim	Bf	2	Eltville am Rhein	RÜD		RMV	6		R		Köln–Wiesbaden	
Hattersheim (Main)	Bf	3	Hattersheim am Main	MTK	November 24, 1839	RMV	4			S	Frankfurt–Wiesbaden	
Haunetal-Neukirchen	Bf	2	Haunetal	HEF		NVV; RMV	6		R		Bebra–Fulda	
Hausen (Taunus)	Hp	1	Neu-Anspach	HG		RMV			R		Friedrichsdorf–Grävenwiesbach	EIU: VHT / EVU: HLB
Häuserhof	Hp	1	Echzell	FB		RMV	6		R		Beienheim–Schotten	
Heckershausen	Bf	2	Ahnatal	KS		NVV				S	Volkmarsen–Vellmar	Regio-Netz Kurhessenbahn
Heppenheim (Bergstr)	Bf	2	Heppenheim (Bergstraße)	HP	June 22, 1846	VRN; RMV	5	L	R		Frankfurt–Heidelberg	
Herborn (Dillkr)	Bf	3	Herborn	LDK	January 12, 1862	RMV	4		R		Siegen–Gießen	
Hergershausen	Hp	2	Babenhausen	DA		RMV	6		R		Mainz–Aschaffenburg	
Herleshausen	Hp	2	Herleshausen	ESW		NVV	6		R		Halle–Bebra	
Herzhausen	Bf	1	Vöhl	KB		NVV			R		Warburg–Sarnau	Regio-Netz Kurhessenbahn; operates only in the summer months
Hesseneck-Kailbach	Hp	1	Hesseneck	ERB	May 1, 1882	RMV; VRN	6		R		Hanau–Eberbach	
Hesseneck-Schöllenbach	Hp	1	Hesseneck	ERB		RMV; VRN	6		R		Hanau–Eberbach	
Hettenhausen	Hp	1	Gersfeld (Rhön)	FD		RMV	7		R		Fulda–Gersfeld	
Heusenstamm	Hp	2	Heusenstamm	OF	December 1, 1898	RMV	5			S	Offenbach–Dietzenbach	
Hirschhorn (Neckar)	Bf	2	Hirschhorn (Neckar)	HP	May 24, 1879	VRN; RMV	4			S	Heidelberg–Bad Friedrichshall	
Hochheim (Main)	Bf	3	Hochheim am Main	MTK		RMV; RNN	4			S	Frankfurt–Wiesbaden	
Höchst (Odenw)	Bf	2	Höchst im Odenwald	ERB		RMV; VRN	6		R		Hanau–Eberbach	
Höchst-Hetschbach	Hp	1	Höchst im Odenwald	ERB		RMV; VRN	7		R		Hanau–Eberbach	
Höchst Mümling-Grumbach	Bf	2	Höchst im Odenwald	ERB		RMV; VRN	6		R		Hanau–Eberbach	
Hofgeismar	Bf	2	Hofgeismar	KS	March 30, 1848	NVV	4		R	S	Warburg–Kassel	
Hofgeismar-Hümme	Bf	3	Hofgeismar	KS	March 6, 1848	NVV	5			S	Warburg–Kassel	
Hofheim (Ried)	Bf	2	Lampertheim	HP	June 1, 1869	VRN; RMV	6		R		Worms–Bensheim; Worms–Biblis	
Hofheim (Taunus)	Bf	3	Hofheim am Taunus	MTK	October 15, 1877	RMV	3		R	S	Frankfurt–Eschhofen	
Hundstadt	Hp	1	Grävenwiesbach	HG		RMV			R		Friedrichsdorf–Grävenwiesbach	EIU: VHT / EVU: HLB
Hünfeld	Bf	4	Hünfeld	FD		RMV; NVV	5	L	R		Bebra–Fulda	
Hungen	Bf	3	Hungen	GI	December 29, 1869	RMV	6		R		Gießen–Gelnhausen	
Idstein (Taunus)	Bf	3	Idstein	RÜD		RMV	5		R		Frankfurt–Eschhofen	
Immenhausen (Hess)	Bf	2	Immenhausen	KS		NVV	5		R	S	Warburg–Kassel	
Jossa	Bf	3	Sinntal	MKK		RMV	5		R		Flieden–Gemünden	
Kassel-Harleshausen	Hp	2	Kassel	KS		NVV	5			S	Warburg–Kassel	
Kassel Hbf	Bf	8	Kassel	KS	August 26, 1848	NVV	2		R	S	Bebra–Kassel; Halle–Kassel; Kassel–Frankfurt; Warburg–Kassel	
Kassel-Jungfernkopf	Hp	2	Kassel	KS	December 13, 2008	NVV	6			S	Warburg–Kassel	
Kassel-Kirchditmold	Hp	2	Kassel	KS	April 2008	NVV	5			S	Warburg–Kassel	
Kassel-Oberzwehren	Hp	2	Kassel	KS		NVV	6			S	Bebra–Kassel; Kassel–Frankfurt	
Kassel-Wilhelmshöhe	Bf	8	Kassel	KS	December 29, 1849	NVV	2	L	R	S	Hanover–Würzburg HSR; Bebra–Kassel; Kassel–Frankfurt; Warburg–Kassel	
Katzenfurt	Hp	2	Ehringshausen	LDK		RMV	6		R		Siegen–Gießen	
Kelkheim	Bf	2	Kelkheim (Taunus)	MTK		RMV	6		R		Frankfurt–Königstein	EIU + EVU: HLB
Kelkheim-Hornau	Bf	2	Kelkheim (Taunus)	MTK		RMV	6		R		Frankfurt–Königstein	EIU + EVU: HLB
Kelkheim-Münster	Hp	1	Kelkheim (Taunus)	MTK		RMV	6		R		Frankfurt–Königstein	EIU + EVU: HLB
Kelsterbach	Bf	3	Kelsterbach	GG	1863	RMV	5			S	Frankfurt Airport loop Mainz–Frankfurt	
Kerkerbach	Bf	2	Runkel	LM		RMV	6		R		Wetzlar–Koblenz	
Kirch Göns	Hp	2	Butzbach	FB		RMV	5		R		Kassel–Frankfurt	
Kirchhain (Bz Kassel)	Bf	3	Kirchhain	MR	March 4, 1850	RMV; NVV	4		R		Kassel–Frankfurt	
Klein Gerau	Hp	2	Büttelborn	GG	August 1, 1858	RMV	6		R		Mainz–Aschaffenburg	
Königstein (Taunus)	Bf	2	Königstein im Taunus	MTK	February 24, 1902	RMV			R		Frankfurt–Königstein	EIU + EVU: HLB
Köppern	Bf	2	Friedrichsdorf	HG		RMV			R		Friedrichsdorf–Grävenwiesbach	EIU: VHT / EVU: HLB
Korbach	Bf	4	Korbach	KB	August 15, 1893	NVV			R		Wabern–Brilon; Warburg–Sarnau	Regio-Netz Kurhessenbahn
Korbach Süd	Hp	1	Korbach	KB		NVV			R		Warburg–Sarnau	Regio-Netz Kurhessenbahn
Körle	Bf	2	Körle	HR	July 15, 1892	NVV	5			S	Bebra–Kassel	
Kriftel	Bf	2	Kriftel	MTK		RMV	4			S	Frankfurt–Eschhofen	
Kronberg (Taunus)	Bf	2	Kronberg im Taunus	HG	November 1, 1874	RMV	5			S	Frankfurt–Kronberg	
Kronberg (Taunus) Süd	Hp	1	Kronberg im Taunus	HG		RMV	6			S	Frankfurt–Kronberg	
Külte-Wetterburg	Hp	1	Volkmarsen	KB		NVV			R		Warburg–Sarnau	Regio-Netz Kurhessenbahn; request stop
Lahntal-Sarnau	Hp	1	Lahntal	MR	July 4, 2010	RMV			R		Kreuztal–Cölbe	Regio-Netz Kurhessenbahn; request stop
Lampertheim	Bf	5	Lampertheim	HP		VRN; RMV	4		R		Mannheim–Frankfurt	
Langen (Hess)	Bf	4	Langen (Hessen)	OF	June 22, 1846	RMV	4		R	S	Frankfurt–Heidelberg	
Langen Flugsicherung	Hp	2	Langen (Hessen)	OF		RMV	5			S	Frankfurt–Heidelberg	
Langenselbold	Bf	3	Langenselbold	MKK	May 1, 1867	RMV	4		R		Fulda–Hanau	
Lang Göns	Bf	3	Langgöns	GI	May 1, 1851	RMV	5		R		Kassel–Frankfurt	
Langsdorf (Oberhess)	Hp	1	Lich	GI		RMV	6		R		Gießen–Gelnhausen	
Lauterbach (Hess) Nord	Bf	2	Lauterbach	VB	October 30, 1870	RMV	6		R		Gießen–Fulda	
Lehnheim	Hp	1	Grünberg	GI		RMV	7		R		Gießen–Fulda	
Leun/Braunfels	Hp	2	Leun	LDK	January 10, 1863	RMV	6		R		Wetzlar–Koblenz	
Lich (Oberhess)	Bf	2	Lich	GI	December 29, 1869	RMV	5		R		Gießen–Gelnhausen	
Lieblos	Hp	1	Gründau	MKK		RMV	6		R		Gießen–Gelnhausen	
Liederbach	Bf	2	Liederbach am Taunus	MTK	1903	RMV			R		Frankfurt–Königstein	EIU + EVU: HLB
Liederbach Süd	Hp	1	Liederbach am Taunus	MTK		RMV			R		Frankfurt–Königstein	EIU + EVU: HLB
Limburg (Lahn)	Bf	6	Limburg a. d. Lahn	LM	July 5, 1862	RMV VRM	3		R		Limburg–Altenkirchen; Wetzlar–Koblenz	
Limburg Süd	Bf	2	Limburg a. d. Lahn	LM	August 1, 2002	RMV	4	L			SFS Köln–Frankfurt	
Lindenholzhausen	Hp	2	Limburg a. d. Lahn	LM		RMV	6		R		Frankfurt–Eschhofen	
Lollar	Bf	3	Lollar	GI	July 25, 1850	RMV	5		R		Kassel–Frankfurt	
Löhnberg	Bf	2	Löhnberg	LM		RMV	6		R		Wetzlar–Koblenz	
Lorch (Rhein)	Bf	3	Lorch	RÜD		RMV	6		R		Köln–Wiesbaden	
Lorchhausen	Hp	2	Lorch	RÜD		RMV	6		R		Köln–Wiesbaden	
Lorsbach	Bf	2	Hofheim am Taunus	MTK		RMV	4			S	Frankfurt–Eschhofen	
Lorsch	Bf	2	Lorsch	HP		VRN; RMV	6		R		Worms–Bensheim	
Lörzenbach-Fahrenbach	Hp	1	Fürth	HP		VRN; RMV	7		R		Weinheim–Fürth	
Ludwigsau-Friedlos	Hp	2	Ludwigsau	HEF		NVV; RMV	6		R		Bebra–Fulda	
Lütter	Bf	2	Eichenzell	FD		RMV	6		R		Fulda–Gersfeld	
Mainhausen Zellhausen	Hp	1	Mainhausen	OF	October 1, 1908	RMV	7		R		Hanau–Eberbach	
Maintal Ost	Bf	3	Maintal	MKK		RMV	4		R		Frankfurt–Hanau	
Maintal West	Hp	2	Maintal	MKK		RMV	5		R		Frankfurt–Hanau	
Mainz-Bischofsheim	Bft	4	Bischofsheim	GG		RMV; RNN	4		R	S	Mainz–Aschaffenburg; Mainz–Frankfurt; Mainz rail bypass	
Mainz-Gustavsburg	Bf	3	Ginsheim-Gustavsburg	GG		RMV; RNN	4		R	S	Mainz–Aschaffenburg; Mainz–Frankfurt	
Mainz-Kastel	Bf	3	Wiesbaden	WI	April 13, 1840	RMV; RNN	4		R	S	Frankfurt–Wiesbaden	
Malsfeld	Hp	2	Malsfeld	HR		NVV	6		R		Bebra–Kassel	
Malsfeld-Beiseförth	Bf	2	Malsfeld	HR		NVV	6		R		Bebra–Kassel	
Mandern	Hp	1	Bad Wildungen	KB		NVV			R		Wabern–Bad Wildungen	Regio-Netz Kurhessenbahn; request stop
Marburg (Lahn)	Bf	6	Marburg	MR	April 3, 1850	RMV; NVV	3	L	R		Kassel–Frankfurt	
Marburg Süd	Hp	2	Marburg	MR		RMV	5		R		Kassel–Frankfurt	
Melbach	Hp	1	Wölfersheim	FB		RMV	6		R		Friedberg–Mücke	
Melsungen	Bf	2	Melsungen	HR		NVV	6		R	S	Bebra–Kassel	
Melsungen Bartenwetzerbrücke	Hp	2	Melsungen	HR	May 20, 2011	NVV	6			S	Bebra–Kassel	
Melsungen-Röhrenfurth	Hp	2	Melsungen	HR		NVV	6			S	Bebra–Kassel	
Mengeringhausen	Hp	1	Bad Arolsen	KB		NVV			R		Warburg–Sarnau	Regio-Netz Kurhessenbahn
Messel	Bf	2	Messel	DA	December 27, 1858	RMV	6		R		Mainz–Aschaffenburg	
Michelstadt	Bf	2	Michelstadt	ERB		RMV; VRN	6		R		Hanau–Eberbach	
Mittel Gründau	Bf	2	Gründau	MKK		RMV	6		R		Gießen–Gelnhausen	
Mörfelden	Bf	3	Mörfelden-Walldorf	GG		RMV	4		R	S	Mannheim–Frankfurt	
Mörlenbach	Hp	1	Mörlenbach	HP		VRN; RMV	6		R		Weinheim–Fürth	
Morschen-Altmorschen	Hp	2	Morschen	HR		NVV	6		R		Bebra–Kassel	
Mücke (Hess)	Bf	1	Mücke	VB		RMV	6		R		Gießen–Fulda	
Mühlheim (Main)	Hp	2	Mühlheim am Main	OF	November 15, 1873	RMV	4			S	Frankfurt–Hanau	
Mühlheim-Dietesheim	Hp	2	Mühlheim am Main	OF		RMV	5			S	Frankfurt–Hanau	
Mühltal	Hp	1	Mühltal	DA	December 27, 1870	RMV	6		R		Darmstadt–Groß Umstadt	
Münchhausen	Bf	2	Münchhausen	MR		RMV; NVV			R		Warburg–Sarnau	Regio-Netz Kurhessenbahn
Münster (b Dieburg)	Hp	1	Münster	OF		RMV	6		R		Offenbach–Reinheim	
Nauheim (b Groß Gerau)	Bf	2	Nauheim	GG		RMV	6		R		Mainz–Aschaffenburg	
Neckarhausen bei Neckarsteinach	Hp	2	Neckarsteinach	HP		VRN; RMV	6			S	Heidelberg–Bad Friedrichshall	
Neckarsteinach	Hp	2	Neckarsteinach	HP	May 24, 1879	VRN; RMV	4			S	Heidelberg–Bad Friedrichshall	
Neu Anspach	Bf	2	Neu-Anspach	HG		RMV			R		Friedrichsdorf–Grävenwiesbach	EIU: VHT / EVU: HLB
Neu Isenburg	Bf	3	Neu-Isenburg	OF	November 1, 1852	RMV	4		R	S	Frankfurt–Heidelberg	
Neuhof (Kr Fulda)	Bf	2	Neuhof	FD	July 1, 1868	RMV	5		R		Fulda–Hanau	
Neustadt (Kr Marburg)	Bf	3	Neustadt (Hessen)	MR		RMV; NVV	5		R		Kassel–Frankfurt	
Nidda	Bf	5	Nidda	FB	June 29, 1870	RMV	5		R		Beienheim–Schotten; Gießen–Gelnhausen	
Nidderau	Bf	4	Nidderau	MKK	December 1, 1879	RMV	5		R		Bad Vilbel–Glauburg-Stockheim; Friedberg–Hanau	
Nidderau-Eichen	Hp	1	Nidderau	MKK		RMV	6		R		Bad Vilbel–Glauburg-Stockheim	
Nidderau-Windecken	Hp	1	Nidderau	MKK		RMV	6		R		Bad Vilbel–Glauburg-Stockheim	
Nieder Ohmen	Bf	2	Mücke	VB		RMV	6		R		Gießen–Fulda	
Nieder Wöllstadt	Bf	3	Wöllstadt	FB		RMV	5			S	Kassel–Frankfurt	
Niederbrechen	Bf	3	Brechen	LM		RMV	5		R		Frankfurt–Eschhofen	
Niederdorfelden	Bf	2	Niederdorfelden	MKK		RMV	6		R		Bad Vilbel–Glauburg-Stockheim	
Niederhadamar	Hp	1	Hadamar	LM		RMV VRM	7		R		Limburg–Altenkirchen	
Niederhöchstadt	Bf	2	Eschborn	MTK	November 1, 1874	RMV	5			S	Frankfurt–Kronberg; Niederhöchstadt–Bad Soden	
Niederjosbach	Hp	2	Eppstein	MTK		RMV	4			S	Frankfurt–Eschhofen	
Niedermittlau	Hp	3	Hasselroth	MKK		RMV	5		R		Fulda–Hanau	
Niedernhausen (Taunus)	Bf	5	Niedernhausen	RÜD	October 15, 1877	RMV	4		R	S	Frankfurt–Eschhofen; Wiesbaden–Niedernhausen	
Niederscheld (Dillkr) Süd	Hp	2	Dillenburg	LDK	January 12, 1862	RMV	6		R		Siegen–Gießen	
Niederselters	Hp	2	Selters (Taunus)	LM		RMV	6		R		Frankfurt–Eschhofen	
Niederwalgern	Bf	2	Niederwalgern	MR		RMV	5		R		Kassel–Frankfurt	
Niederwalluf	Bf	2	Walluf	RÜD		RMV; RNN	6		R		Köln–Wiesbaden	
Niederweimar	Hp	2	Weimar (Lahn)	MR		RMV	6		R		Kassel–Frankfurt	
Niederzeuzheim	Bf	2	Hadamar	LM		RMV	6		R		Limburg–Altenkirchen	
Ober Ramstadt	Bf	2	Ober-Ramstadt	DA	December 27, 1870	RMV	6		R		Darmstadt–Groß Umstadt	
Ober Widdersheim	Bf	3	Nidda	FB		RMV	6		R		Gießen–Gelnhausen	
Oberbimbach	Hp	1	Großenlüder	FD		RMV	6		R		Gießen–Fulda	
Oberbrechen	Hp	2	Brechen	LM		RMV	6		R		Frankfurt–Eschhofen	
Oberelsungen	Hp	1	Zierenberg	KS		NVV				S	Volkmarsen–Vellmar	Regio-Netz Kurhessenbahn
Obertshausen (Kr Offenbach)	Bf	2	Obertshausen	OF	October 30, 1896	RMV	5			S	Offenbach–Reinheim	
Oberursel (Taunus)	Bf	2	Oberursel (Taunus)	HG	September 10, 1860	RMV	4		R	S	Frankfurt–Friedrichsdorf	
Oberursel-Stierstadt	Hp	2	Oberursel (Taunus)	HG	1998	RMV	5			S	Frankfurt–Friedrichsdorf	
Oberursel-Weißkirchen/Steinbach	Bf	2	Oberursel (Taunus)	HG	September 10, 1860	RMV	5			S	Frankfurt–Friedrichsdorf	
Oestrich-Winkel	Bf	2	Oestrich-Winkel	RÜD		RMV	6		R		Köln–Wiesbaden	
Offenbach-Bieber	Bf	2	Offenbach am Main	OF	October 30, 1896	RMV	5			S	Offenbach–Dietzenbach; Offenbach–Reinheim	
Offenbach (Main) Hbf	Bf	6	Offenbach am Main	OF	November 15, 1873	RMV	4	L	R		Hanau–Frankfurt; Offenbach–Reinheim	
Offenbach-Kaiserlei	Hp	2	Offenbach am Main	OF	May 23, 1995	RMV	4			S	City-Tunnel Offenbach	
Offenbach Ledermuseum	Hp	2	Offenbach am Main	OF	May 23, 1995	RMV	4			S	City-Tunnel Offenbach	
Offenbach Marktplatz	Hp	2	Offenbach am Main	OF	May 23, 1995	RMV	4			S	City-Tunnel Offenbach	
Offenbach (Main) Ost	Bf	3	Offenbach am Main	OF		RMV	3			S	City-Tunnel Offenbach; Frankfurt–Hanau; Offenbach–Reinheim	
Offenbach-Waldhof	Hp	2	Offenbach am Main	OF	December 14, 2003	RMV	5			S	Offenbach–Reinheim	
Okarben	Hp	2	Karben	FB	1894	RMV	5			S	Kassel–Frankfurt	
Ostheim (b Butzbach)	Hp	2	Butzbach	FB		RMV	5		R		Kassel–Frankfurt	
Ostheim (Kr Hanau)	Hp	2	Nidderau	MKK		RMV	6		R		Friedberg–Hanau	
Otzberg-Lengfeld	Hp	1	Otzberg	DA	May 15, 1871	RMV	6		R		Darmstadt–Groß Umstadt	
Pfungstadt	Hp	1	Pfungstadt	DA	December 20, 1886	RMV	6		R		Darmstadt–Pfungstadt	
Ranstadt	Hp	1	Ranstadt	FB		RMV	6		R		Gießen–Gelnhausen	
Raunheim	Bf	3	Raunheim	GG		RMV	4			S	Mainz–Frankfurt	
Reichelsheim (Wetterau)	Bf	2	Reichelsheim (Wetterau)	FB		RMV	6		R		Beienheim–Schotten	
Reinheim (Odenw)	Bf	2	Reinheim	DA	May 15, 1871	RMV	6		R		Darmstadt–Groß Umstadt	
Reisen (Hess)	Hp	1	Birkenau	HP		VRN; RMV	6		R		Weinheim–Fürth	
Reiskirchen (Kr Gießen)	Bf	2	Reiskirchen	GI		RMV	6		R		Gießen–Fulda	
Ried	Hp	1	Ebersburg	FD		RMV	6		R		Fulda–Gersfeld	
Riedrode	Hp	1	Bürstadt	HP		VRN; RMV	6		R		Worms–Bensheim	
Riedstadt-Goddelau	Bf	5	Riedstadt	GG	April 15, 1869	RMV	4		R	S	Mannheim–Frankfurt	
Riedstadt-Wolfskehlen	Hp	2	Riedstadt	GG		RMV	6			S	Mannheim–Frankfurt	
Rimbach	Bf	2	Rimbach	HP	July 1, 1895	VRN; RMV	6		R		Weinheim–Fürth	
Rodenbach (Dillkr)	Hp	2	Haiger	LDK	December 1, 1915	RMV	6		R		Siegen–Gießen	
Rodenbach (b Hanau)	Hp	3	Rodenbach	MKK		RMV	5		R		Fulda–Hanau	
Rödermark-Ober Roden	Bf	4	Rödermark	OF	October 30, 1896	RMV	4		R	S	Dreieich–Rödermark; Offenbach–Reinheim	
Rödermark-Urberach	Bf	2	Rödermark	OF		RMV	6		R		Dreieich–Rödermark	
Rodgau-Dudenhofen	Hp	2	Rodgau	OF	October 30, 1896	RMV	5			S	Offenbach–Reinheim	
Rodgau-Hainhausen	Hp	2	Rodgau	OF		RMV	5			S	Offenbach–Reinheim	
Rodgau-Jügesheim	Hp	2	Rodgau	OF	October 30, 1896	RMV	5			S	Offenbach–Reinheim	
Rodgau-Nieder Roden	Hp	2	Rodgau	OF	October 30, 1896	RMV	5			S	Offenbach–Reinheim	
Rodgau-Rollwald	Hp	2	Rodgau	OF		RMV	6			S	Offenbach–Reinheim	
Rodgau-Weiskirchen	Hp	2	Rodgau	OF	October 30, 1896	RMV	5			S	Offenbach–Reinheim	
Rodheim v d Höhe	Hp	1	Rosbach v. d. Höhe	FB		RMV	7		R		Friedberg–Friedrichsdorf	
Ronshausen	Hp	2	Ronshausen	HEF		NVV	6		R		Halle–Bebra	
Rönshausen	Hp	1	Eichenzell	FD		RMV	7		R		Fulda–Gersfeld	
Rosbach v d Höhe	Bf	2	Rosbach v. d. Höhe	FB	July 15, 1901	RMV	6		R		Friedberg–Friedrichsdorf	
Rotenburg an der Fulda	Hp	2	Rotenburg an der Fulda	HEF		NVV; RMV	6		R		Bebra–Kassel	
Rotenburg an der Fulda-Lispenhausen	Hp	2	Rotenburg an der Fulda	HEF		NVV; RMV	6		R		Bebra–Kassel	
Rüdesheim (Rhein)	Bf	3	Rüdesheim am Rhein	RÜD	August 11, 1856	RMV	5		R		Köln–Wiesbaden	
Runkel	Hp	2	Runkel	LM		RMV	6		R		Wetzlar–Koblenz	
Rüsselsheim	Bf	3	Rüsselsheim	GG		RMV	3		R	S	Mainz–Frankfurt	
Rüsselsheim Opelwerk	Bf	4	Rüsselsheim	GG		RMV	4			S	Mainz–Frankfurt	
Saalburg	Hp	2	Wehrheim	HG		RMV			R		Friedrichsdorf–Grävenwiesbach	EIU: VHT / EVU: HLB
Saasen	Hp	1	Reiskirchen	GI		RMV	7		R		Gießen–Fulda	
Schlierbach (Kr Schwalm-Eder)	Bf	2	Neuental	HR	1880	NVV	6			S	Kassel–Frankfurt	
Schlüchtern	Bf	4	Schlüchtern	MKK		RMV	4	L	R		Flieden–Gemünden; Fulda–Hanau	
Schmalnau	Hp	1	Ebersburg	FD		RMV	7		R		Fulda–Gersfeld	
Schmittlotheim	Hp	1	Vöhl	KB		NVV			R		Warburg–Sarnau	Regio-Netz Kurhessenbahn; operates only in the summer months
Schneidhain	Hp	1	Königstein im Taunus	HG		RMV			R		Frankfurt–Königstein	EIU + EVU: HLB
Schöneck-Büdesheim	Hp	1	Schöneck	MKK		RMV	6		R		Bad Vilbel–Glauburg-Stockheim	
Schöneck-Kilianstädten	Hp	1	Schöneck	MKK		RMV	6		R		Bad Vilbel–Glauburg-Stockheim	
Schöneck-Oberdorfelden	Hp	1	Schöneck	MKK		RMV	6		R		Bad Vilbel–Glauburg-Stockheim	
Schwalbach a Ts (Limes)	Hp	1	Schwalbach am Taunus	MTK	December 22, 1970	RMV	5			S	Niederhöchstadt–Bad Soden	
Schwalbach Nord	Hp	1	Schwalbach am Taunus	MTK	October 31, 2008	RMV	6			S	Niederhöchstadt–Bad Soden	
Schwalmstadt-Wiera	Hp	2	Schwalmstadt	HR		NVV; RMV	6		R		Kassel–Frankfurt	
Sechshelden	Hp	2	Haiger	LDK	1916	RMV	6		R		Siegen–Gießen	
Seligenstadt (Hess)	Bf	2	Seligenstadt	OF	May 1, 1882	RMV	6		R		Hanau–Eberbach	
Seulberg	Hp	2	Friedrichsdorf	HG		RMV	5		R	S	Frankfurt–Friedrichsdorf	
Simtshausen	Hp	1	Münchhausen	MR		RMV; NVV			R		Warburg–Sarnau	Regio-Netz Kurhessenbahn; relocated by 500 m in 2010
Singlis	Hp	2	Borken (Hessen)	HR		NVV	6			S	Kassel–Frankfurt	
Sinn	Bf	2	Sinn	LDK		RMV	6		R		Siegen–Gießen	
Solms	Hp	2	Solms	LDK		RMV	6		R		Wetzlar–Koblenz	
Sontra	Bf	3	Sontra	ESW		NVV	6		R		Bebra–Göttingen	
Stadtallendorf	Bf	3	Stadtallendorf	MR		RMV; NVV	4		R		Kassel–Frankfurt	
Staffel	Bf	2	Limburg a. d. Lahn	LM	January 1, 1870	RMV VRM	6		R		Limburg–Altenkirchen; Limburg–Siershahn	
Steinau (Straße)	Bf	4	Steinau an der Straße	MKK	July 1, 1868	RMV	5		R		Fulda–Hanau	
Steinheim/Main	Hp	1	Hanau	HU	November 15, 1873	RMV	5			S	Frankfurt–Hanau	formerly: Klein Steinheim
Sterbfritz	Bf	2	Sinntal	MKK		RMV	6		R		Flieden–Gemünden	
Sterzhausen	Hp	1	Lahntal	MR	March 19, 1883	RMV			R		Kreuztal–Cölbe	Regio-Netz Kurhessenbahn
Stockhausen (Lahn)	Bf	2	Leun	LDK		RMV	6		R		Wetzlar–Koblenz	
Stockstadt (Rhein)	Hp	2	Stockstadt am Rhein	GG		RMV	6		R		Mannheim–Frankfurt	
Sulzbach (Taunus)	Hp	1	Sulzbach (Taunus)	MTK		RMV	6		R		Frankfurt–Bad Soden	
Sulzbach (Taunus) Nord	Hp	1	Sulzbach (Taunus)	MTK	November 6, 1972	RMV	6			S	Niederhöchstadt–Bad Soden	
Trais-Horloff	Hp	1	Hungen	GI		RMV	7		R		Gießen–Gelnhausen	
Treysa	Bf	5	Schwalmstadt	HR	October 1, 1908	NVV; RMV	4	L	R	S	Kassel–Frankfurt	
Twiste	Hp	1	Twistetal	KB		NVV			R		Warburg–Sarnau	Regio-Netz Kurhessenbahn
Ungedanken	Hp	1	Fritzlar	HR		NVV			R		Wabern–Bad Wildungen	Regio-Netz Kurhessenbahn; request stop
Usingen	Bf	2	Usingen	HG	October 15, 1895	RMV			R		Friedrichsdorf–Grävenwiesbach	EIU: VHT / EVU: HLB
Usseln	Bf	2	Willingen (Upland)	KB	August 14, 1916	NVV			R		Wega–Brilon Wald	Regio-Netz Kurhessenbahn
Vellmar-Niedervellmar	Hp	2	Vellmar	KS		NVV	6		R		Halle–Kassel	
Vellmar-Obervellmar	Bf	2	Vellmar	KS		NVV	4		R	S	Volkmarsen–Vellmar; Warburg–Kassel	
Vellmar-Osterberg/EKZ	Hp	2	Vellmar	KS		NVV	5			S	Warburg–Kassel	
Vernawahlshausen	Hp	1	Wahlsburg	KS		NVV	7		R		Göttingen–Bodenfelde	
Viermünden	Hp	1	Frankenberg (Eder)	KB		NVV			R		Warburg–Sarnau	Regio-Netz Kurhessenbahn; operates only in the summer months
Villmar	Hp	2	Villmar	LM	October 14, 1862	RMV	6		R		Wetzlar–Koblenz	
Volkmarsen	Bf	2	Volkmarsen	KB		NVV			R		Volkmarsen–Vellmar; Warburg–Sarnau	Regio-Netz Kurhessenbahn
Wabern (Bz Kassel)	Bf	5	Wabern	HR	December 29, 1849	NVV; RMV	4	L	R	S	Kassel–Frankfurt; Wabern–Bad Wildungen	
Wächtersbach	Bf	3	Wächtersbach	MKK	May 1, 1867	RMV	4		R		Fulda–Hanau	
Wallau (Lahn)	Hp	1	Biedenkopf	MR	March 19, 1883	RMV			R		Kreuztal–Cölbe	Regio-Netz Kurhessenbahn
Walldorf (Hess)	Bf	3	Mörfelden-Walldorf	GG		RMV	5		R	S	Mannheim–Frankfurt	
Watzenborn-Steinberg	Hp	1	Pohlheim	GI	December 29, 1869	RMV	6		R		Gießen–Gelnhausen	
Weckesheim	Hp	1	Reichelsheim (Wetterau)	FB		RMV	7		R		Beienheim–Schotten	
Wega	Bf	2	Bad Wildungen	KB	July 15, 1884	NVV			R		Wabern–Bad Wildungen	Regio-Netz Kurhessenbahn
Wehretal-Reichensachsen	Hp	2	Wehretal	ESW		NVV	6		R		Bebra–Göttingen	
Wehrheim	Bf	2	Wehrheim	HG	October 15, 1895	RMV			R		Friedrichsdorf–Grävenwiesbach	EIU: VHT / EVU: HLB
Weilburg	Bf	2	Weilburg	LM	October 14, 1862	RMV	5		R		Wetzlar–Koblenz	
Weimar (Kr Kassel)	Bf	2	Ahnatal	KS		NVV			R	S	Volkmarsen–Vellmar	Regio-Netz Kurhessenbahn
Weiterstadt	Bf	2	Weiterstadt	DA	August 1, 1858	RMV	6		R		Mainz–Aschaffenburg	
Welkers	Hp	1	Eichenzell	FD		RMV	7		R		Fulda–Gersfeld	
Werdorf	Hp	2	Aßlar	LDK	1889	RMV	6		R		Siegen–Gießen	
Wetter (Hessen)	Bf	2	Wetter (Hessen)	MR		RMV; NVV			R		Warburg–Sarnau	Regio-Netz Kurhessenbahn; until 2010: Wetter (Hess-Nass)
Wetzlar	Bf	5	Wetzlar	LDK	January 12, 1862	RMV	3		R		Siegen–Gießen; Wetzlar–Koblenz	
Wiesbaden-Biebrich	Bft	2	Wiesbaden	WI	August 11, 1856	RMV; RNN	6		R		Köln–Wiesbaden	
Wiesbaden-Erbenheim	Hp	1	Wiesbaden	WI		RMV; RNN	6		R		Wiesbaden–Niedernhausen	
Wiesbaden Hbf	Bf	10	Wiesbaden	WI	November 15, 1906	RMV; RNN	2	L	R	S	Frankfurt–Wiesbaden; Köln–Wiesbaden; Wiesbaden–Niedernhausen; Mainz–Wiesbaden; Breckenheim–Wiesbaden	
Wiesbaden-Igstadt	Bf	2	Wiesbaden	WI		RMV; RNN	5		R		Wiesbaden–Niedernhausen	
Wiesbaden Ost	Bf	4	Wiesbaden	WI	May 19, 1840	RMV; RNN	4			S	Frankfurt–Wiesbaden	
Wiesbaden-Schierstein	Bf	2	Wiesbaden	WI		RMV; RNN	6		R		Köln–Wiesbaden	
Wiesenfeld	Hp	1	Burgwald	KB		NVV; RMV			R		Warburg–Sarnau	Regio-Netz Kurhessenbahn; request stop
Wildeck-Bosserode	Hp	2	Wildeck	HEF		NVV	6		R		Halle–Bebra	
Wildeck-Hönebach	Bf	2	Wildeck	HEF		NVV	6		R		Halle–Bebra	
Wildeck-Obersuhl	Hp	2	Wildeck	HEF		NVV	6		R		Halle–Bebra	
Wilhelmsdorf (Taunus)	Bf	2	Usingen	HG		RMV			R		Friedrichsdorf–Grävenwiesbach	EIU: VHT / EVU: HLB
Wilhelmshütte (Lahn)	Hp	1	Dautphetal	MR	March 19, 1883	RMV			R		Kreuztal–Cölbe	Regio-Netz Kurhessenbahn; request stop
Wilsenroth	Bf	2	Dornburg	LM	October 1, 1886	RMV VRM	6		R		Limburg–Altenkirchen	
Wirtheim	Bf	4	Biebergemünd	MKK	1893	RMV	6		R		Fulda–Hanau	
Witzenhausen Nord	Bf	2	Witzenhausen	ESW		NVV	5		R		Halle–Kassel	
Willingen	Bf	2	Willingen (Upland)	KB	October 12, 1914	NVV			R		Wega–Brilon Wald	Regio-Netz Kurhessenbahn
Willingen Stryck	Hp	1	Willingen (Upland)	KB		NVV			R		Wega–Brilon Wald	Regio-Netz Kurhessenbahn; only for events
Wölfersheim-Södel	Bf	2	Wölfersheim	FB		RMV	6		R		Friedberg–Mücke	
Wolfgang (Kr Hanau)	Bf	4	Hanau	HU		RMV	6		R		Fulda–Hanau	formerly: Pulverfabrik b. Hanau
Wolfhagen	Bf	3	Wolfhagen	KS	September 1, 1897	NVV			R	S	Volkmarsen–Vellmar	Regio-Netz Kurhessenbahn
Wörsdorf	Hp	2	Idstein	RÜD	October 15, 1877	RMV	6		R		Frankfurt–Eschhofen	
Zell-Romrod	Hp	1	Romrod	VB		RMV	7		R		Gießen–Fulda	
Zennern	Hp	1	Wabern	HR		NVV; RMV			R		Wabern–Bad Wildungen	Regio-Netz Kurhessenbahn; request stop
Zeppelinheim	Bf	2	Neu-Isenburg	OF	1934	RMV	6			S	Mannheim–Frankfurt	
Zierenberg	Bf	3	Zierenberg	KS		NVV			R	S	Volkmarsen–Vellmar	Regio-Netz Kurhessenbahn
Zierenberg-Rosental	Hp	1	Zierenberg	KS		NVV				S	Volkmarsen–Vellmar	Regio-Netz Kurhessenbahn
Zimmersrode	Bf	3	Neuental	HR	January 2, 1850	NVV	6			S	Kassel–Frankfurt	
Zotzenbach	Hp	1	Rimbach	HP		VRN; RMV	6		R		Weinheim–Fürth	
Zwingenberg (Bergstr)	Hp	2	Zwingenberg	HP	June 22, 1846	VRN; RMV	6		R		Frankfurt–Heidelberg	

== See also ==
- German railway station categories
- Railway station types of Germany
- List of scheduled railway routes in Germany
