= Niederwalgern station =

Railway station in Weimar, Germany

Niederwalgern
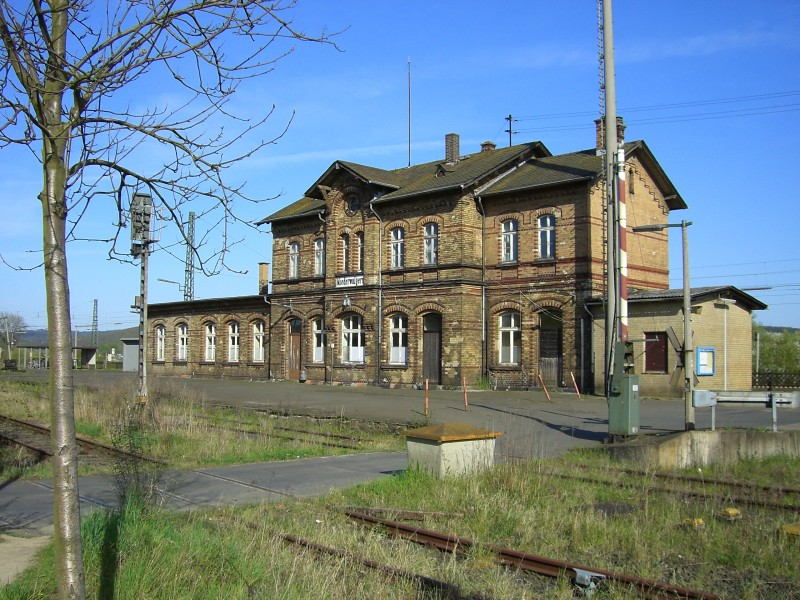
- 2007

General information
- Location: Bahnhofstr. 1, Weimar (Lahn), Hesse; Germany
- Coordinates: 50°44′11″N 8°42′30″E
- Owner: Deutsche Bahn
- Operator: DB Station&Service
- Lines: Main-Weser Railway (km 115.4) (KBS 620); Aar-Salzböde Railway (km 0.0) (until 1995: KBS 624)
- Platforms: 2 (formerly 4)

Construction
- Accessible: Yes

Other information
- Station code: 4535
- DS100 code: FNL
- IBNR: 8004417
- Category: 5
- Fare zone: : 0571
- Website: www.bahnhof.de

History
- Opened: 25 August 1850

Services
Preceding station	DB Regio Mitte	Following station
Marburg Süd towards Kassel Hbf	RE 30 selected trains only	Lollar towards Frankfurt (Main) Hbf
Niederweimar towards Treysa	RB 41	Fronhausen (Lahn) towards Frankfurt (Main) Hbf
Preceding station	Hessische Landesbahn	Following station
Niederweimar towards Kassel Hbf	RE 98 selected trains only	Fronhausen (Lahn) towards Frankfurt (Main) Hbf
Location
- Location within Hesse Location within Germany Location within Europe

Niederwalgern station is a station on the Main-Weser Railway in the town of Niederwalgern in the German state of Hesse, south of Marburg. It is the only station of the town and the largest in the municipality of Weimar (Lahn). The station is classified by Deutsche Bahn (DB) as a category 5 station. The station is heritage-listed under the Hessian Heritage Act.

== History ==
The station was opened in 1850 at the same time as the Main-Weser Railway. The village of Niederwalgern experienced a boom as a result of the opening of the railway. A depot was built to the northern part of the station precincts, which was partly used for loading freight. The importance of the station, especially for passengers, continued to increase with the opening of the Aar–Salzböde Railway in May 1894. The Main-Weser Railway was electrified in the 1960s. This also applied to a short section of the line to Herborn in the railway station.

The demise of the station began in the 1980s, when the electric overhead in the western part of the station and many remote sidings were removed. In addition, the loading of freight has been completely abandoned. In 1992, the last freight train ran from Gladenbach into the station, and the closure of the Aar–Salzböde railway was likely. When passenger operations ended on the eastern part of this route in May 1995, despite the positive report of an inquiry, the importance of the station declined significantly. Some rail services were cancelled and the station staff was withdrawn. The reactivation of the Aar–Salzböde railway became ever more unlikely with the abandonment of the total traffic on the western sector (2001), total closure (2002) and finally the dismantling of the track to the west of Niederwalgern (2006). Today, the route to Herborn is dismantled, except in the station area in Niederwalgern. The freight yard is closed and the number of operable tracks has been reduced to three. Moreover, in recent years, some freight tracks in the northern part of the station and connecting tracks to the Aar–Salzböde railway have been dismantled.

The station is designed to be a largely barrier-free environment. The only problem for people with disabilities is the passenger level crossing from platform 1 to platform 2, which lies between the tracks.

== Location ==
The station is located on the northeast edge of Niederwalgern on the road to Wenkbach. On the western side of the station there is parking and a bus stop. It is the biggest public transport hub of the municipality.

== Bus connections ==
In addition to park and ride car spaces there is a bus stop called Niederwalgern Bahnhof. This is served by the following bus routes:

- MR-31 (Niederweimar–Niederwalgern)
- MR-32 (Kehna–Fronhausen)
- MR-36 (Oberwalgern–Niederwalgern), once a day
- MR-37 (Niederwalgern Schule-Rodenhausen/Reimershausen/Lohra)
- MR-38 (Weipholtshausen–Wenkbach)

== Infrastructure ==
=== Entrance building ===
The entrance building is a brick building from the 19th century. It was divided into a station restaurant, which was housed in an annex that no longer exists, and a waiting hall with a ticket office and signal box for the Aar–Salzböde railway. In the 1990s, the station staff were removed, and since then it has been empty. The entrance building has been abandoned and, although it is heritage-listed under the Hessian Heritage Act, it is not maintained.

=== Platforms ===
Niederwalgern station has three tracks, two of which run next to a platform. There are also two disused tracks and a platform on the Aar–Salzböde railway. To the north of the passenger station, there are some freight tracks that are now all abandoned.

- Track 1 along with tracks 2 and 3 are used by the Main-Weser Railway, and it is the “house” platform (next to the station building) of the station. It is used by trains to Gießen and Frankfurt.
- Track 2 is the intermediate platform and is usually used by trains to Marburg and Treysa.
- Track 3 is a passing loop and is used only by moving freight trains and intercity trains.
- The tracks of the Aar–Salzböde railway were only used by passenger trains. Track 4, the platform next to the station building (which lies within the wedge between the separating lines), was used by most trains. The other track (track 5) was used only for passing and for parking trains, which had already terminated here.

=== Signal box ===
The Nf signal box is located south of the station building and was used exclusively for the Main-Weser Railway. It is built to the design known as Sp Dr S60. The Aar–Salzböde railway also had a small signal box in the station building. This, however, has not been used since the abandonment of all traffic on the line in 1995.

== Operations ==
The station is served on the Main-Weser Railway by the Mittelhessen-Express (RB 41), running hourly on weekdays between Treysa and Frankfurt (and every two hours on Saturday afternoon and Sunday). In the past Regionalbahn trains operated on different routes. Since December 2010, a new type of service, the Main-Sieg-Express (RE 99), runs every two hours between Marburg and Frankfurt. As a result, the integration of the station in the network has developed very positively. In the peak hour some Regional-Express services (Kassel–Frankfurt or Marburg–Frankfurt) also stop here, and there are shuttles between Treysa or Marburg and Giessen.

The trains on the Aar–Salzböde railway did not run to a fixed pattern. They ran from Herborn to Niederwalgern, continued non-stop to Marburg and then returned.

At peak times some individual Regional-Express services stop in Niederwalgern. This has been preserved from the time when it was possible to change to the trains to Herborn. Meanwhile, however, there are demands that the trains stop in Fronhausen station instead, which is busier than Niederwalgern. The station is located in the area administered by the Rhine-Main Transport Association (Rhein-Main-Verkehrsverbund, RMV).
