= Burg (Dillkr) Nord station =

Railway station in Germany

Burg (Dillkr) Nord
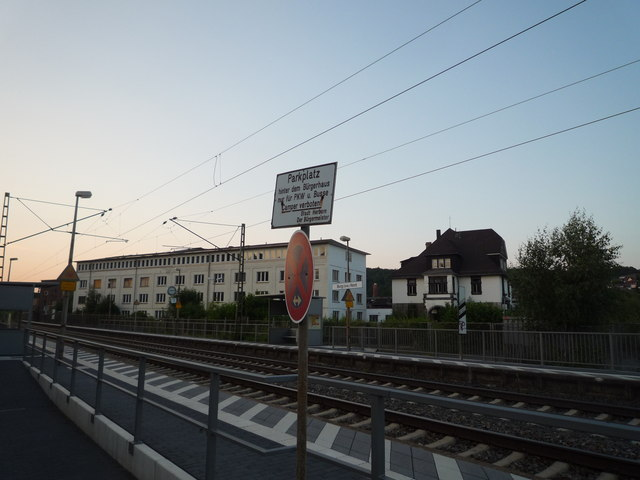
- 2013

General information
- Location: Junostraße 1; 35745 Burg; Hesse; Germany
- Coordinates: 50.7000°N 8.3076°E
- System: Hp
- Owner: Deutsche Bahn
- Operator: DB Netz; DB Station&Service
- Lines: Dill Railway (KBS 445)
- Platforms: 2 side platforms
- Tracks: 2
- Train operators: DB Regio Mitte; Hessische Landesbahn
- Connections: RE 99; RB 40

Construction
- Parking: yes
- Cycle facilities: no
- Accessible: partly

Other information
- Station code: 975
- DS100 code: FBUN
- IBNR: 8001271
- Category: 6
- Fare zone: : 5701
- Website: www.bahnhof.de

Services
Preceding station	DB Regio Mitte	Following station
Niederscheld (Dillkr) Süd towards Dillenburg	RB 40	Herborn (Dillkr) towards Frankfurt (Main) Hbf
Preceding station	Hessische Landesbahn	Following station
Niederscheld (Dillkr) Süd towards Siegen Hbf	RE 99 selected trains only	Herborn (Dillkr) towards Frankfurt (Main) Hbf
Location
- Location within Hesse Location within Germany Location within Europe

Burg (Dillkr) Nord station (German: Haltepunkt Burg (Dillkr) Nord) is a railway station in the municipality of Burg, located in the Lahn-Dill-Kreis district in Hesse, Germany.
