= Wabern–Bad Wildungen railway =

Railway line in Germany

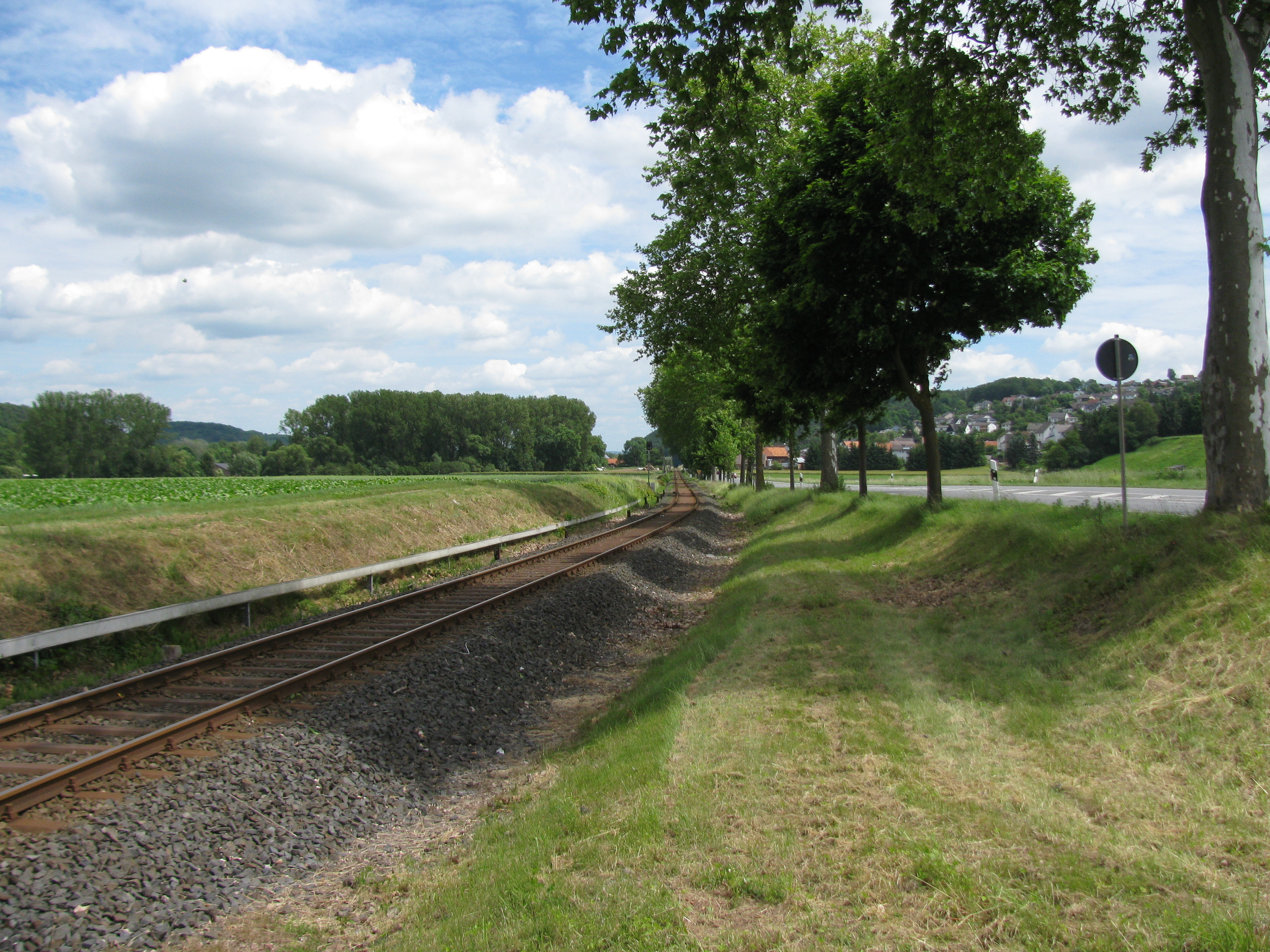
- Line between Ungedanken and Mandern

Overview
- Line number: 3941
- Locale: Hesse, Germany
- Termini: Wabern; Bad Wildungen

Service
- Route number: 621

Technical
- Line length: 17.188 km (10.680 mi)
- Track gauge: 1,435 mm (4 ft 8 1/2 in) standard gauge
- Operating speed: 60 kilometres per hour (37 mph)
- Signalling: PZB
- Maximum incline: 1.9%
Route map
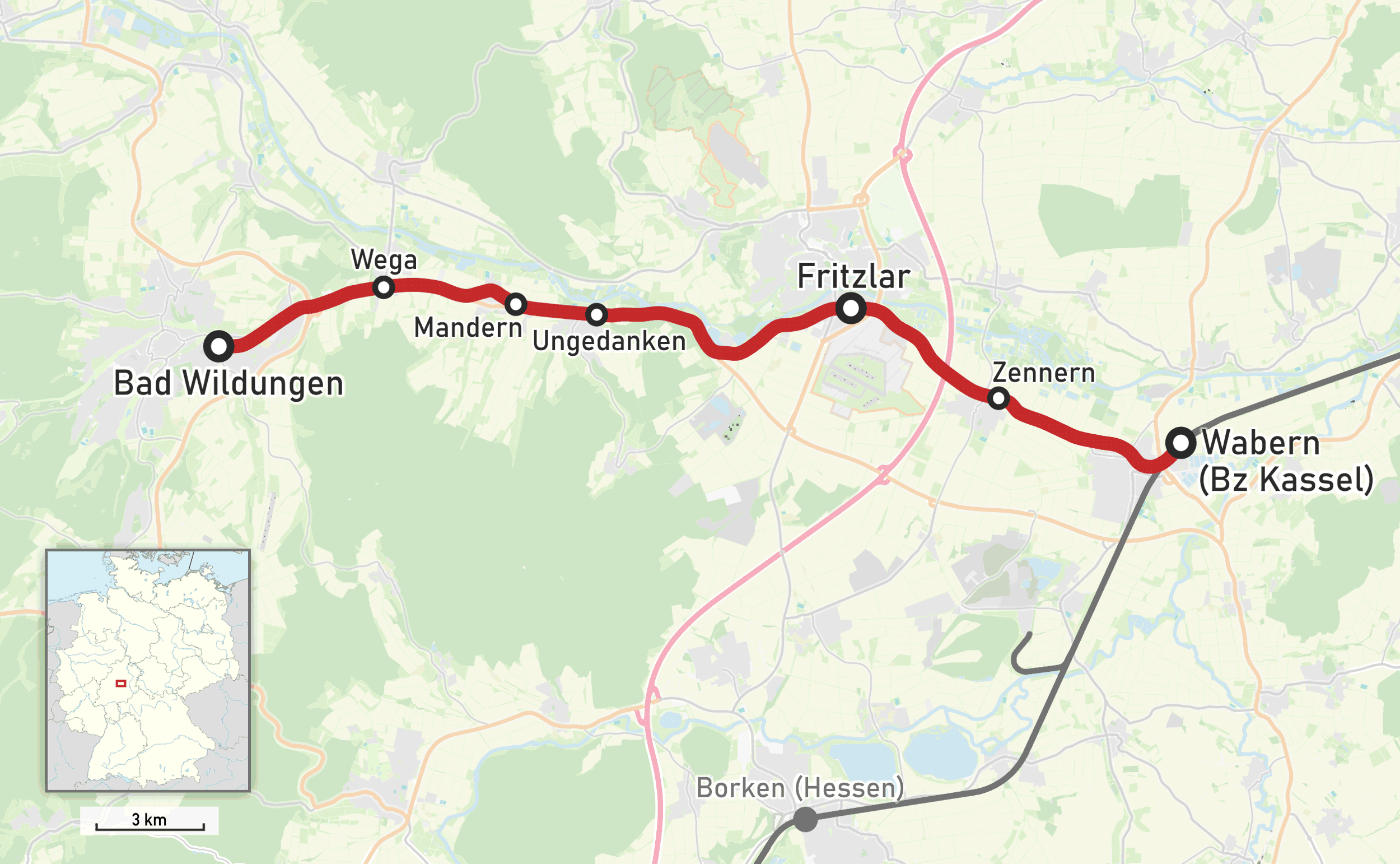
- Source: German railway atlas

The Wabern–Bad Wildungen railway is a 17.2 km (10.7 mi)-long, single-track, unelectrified secondary railway line in the Schwalm-Eder district and the Waldeck-Frankenberg district in North Hesse. It runs from Wabern to Bad Wildungen and is operated by DB RegioNetz as part of the Kurhessenbahn network.

== Route ==
The line towards Korbach commences at Wabern (Bz Kassel) station in the municipality of Wabern, where there is a connection to the Main-Weser Railway. It initially runs upstream in the valley of the Eder through the Schwalm-Eder district to Zennern, after which it crosses Autobahn 49, and continues along federal road 253 via Fritzlar and through the Porta Hassiaca (Hessian Gate) via Ungedanken and Mandern to Wega. The line from Mandern to Willingen passes through the Waldeck-Frankenberg district.

The line continues from the Wega triangular juncture along federal road 253 through the valley of Wilde to the terminal station at Bad Wildungen. Freight trains on the Wabern–Korbach route were able to bypass Bad Wildungen, using a connecting curve in Wega.

In Fritzlar and Wildungen, the station buildings were constructed of masonry and included staff apartments on the upper floor. In Zennern, Mandern, and Wega, however, simple, barrack-like station buildings were constructed of brick-infilled timber framing.

== History ==
In the years following the opening of the Main-Weser Railway in 1852, which, for topographical reasons, ran through the southeastern part of the Wabern Basin, the towns of Fritzlar and Nieder-Wildungen increasingly desired the construction of a secondary railway to connect to the main line. Due to its limited financial viability and the difficult terrain of the adjacent Eder Uplands region, the proposal initially met with no interest. In 1877, a railway committee was founded in Nieder-Wildungen, which received ministerial approval and began preliminary work for a branch line, but failed to secure funding.

=== Route planning ===
The Royal Prussian Government, under its law of 15 May 1882, authorised the Ministry of Public Works to construct a railway line from Wabern to Wildungen. The profitability calculation determined a catchment area of 560 km^{2} (220 sq mi) with 39,000 inhabitants for the towns and villages located up to approximately 8 km (5.0 mi) from the station locations, and its population density of 70/km^{2} (180/sq mi) inhabitants was considered a respectable figure for a rural area. The calculation included not only the towns of Fritzlar and Wildungen, but also, to a large extent, the communities of the Wabern Basin. Freight was expected to consist primarily of agricultural, forestry and industrial products. In 1881, an operating surplus of 588 marks per kilometre (941 marks per mile) was predicted. The operating profit of the branch line was projected at only 11.3 %, compared to the average of 47.6% on main lines. Thus, it was doubted if the branch line would be very profitable. The route planning was not particularly demanding. The proportion of expenditure for earthworks and engineering structures was set unusually low in the cost estimate.

=== Commissioning and first years of operation ===
The Prussian state railways opened the line on 15 July 1884.

Since traffic volume exceeded expectations, the railway authority in Fritzlar had additional sidings and sets of points installed. Wabern station was also expanded. By 1896 at the latest, a locomotive shed with a turntable existed there in the angle between the two lines.

=== Dismantling of Zennern station ===
Zennern station was downgraded to a halt, and the signal box with the track circuit to and from the two neighboring stations, Wabern and Fritzlar, was taken out of service in 1998. No new track circuit was installed between Wabern and Fritzlar, resulting in a continuing reduction in operational reliability.

=== Modernisation ===
The federal government's modernisation program for making small railway stations accessible also supports the expansion of the platforms in Fritzlar, Ungedanken and Mandern.

In conjunction with the Technical Support Train Signaling System, additional 2000 Hz track magnets were to be installed at the departure signals on the Wabern–Fritzlar section of the line, which is not equipped with track circuits, in 2023. At the end of 2023, the reconstruction of Fritzlar station began with the installation of an electronic interlocking system and a new island platform. Wega station was downgraded to a halt, and the operating procedure between Fritzlar and Bad Wildungen was changed from train control operation back to train signaling operation. The modernisation was completed in May 2024.

== Vehicle deployment ==
Initially, one train set was used. Presumably, the trains each consisted of a then-new T 3 class locomotive, two second/third class passenger cars, one third/fourth class car, a combined baggage/mail car, and on average two loaded freight cars, one general cargo car and one empty car.

In the early 1960s, Deutsche Bundesbahn switched from steam to diesel traction on the line.

== Current operations ==
As planned in the operational schedule, three daily pairs of mixed trains ran from the opening. The expected traffic volume, especially for general (less than carload) freight, was significantly exceeded immediately after the line opened. Due to the increase in traffic, additional passenger and freight trains were introduced in the 1890s. Because of the short track lengths at Fritzlar station, the military trains of the Fritzlar garrison, which were over 100 axles long, were transported in two sections between Fritzlar and Wabern.

In 1895, six pairs of trains ran daily.

The connecting curve at the Wega rail junction was last used on 30 December 1992 by a special railbus train of class 795/995.

Since the timetable change in 2008/2009, the service has been operated by the Kurhessenbahn, which took over operations from the Hessische Landesbahn. Until December 2015, most of the trains ran only on the route between Wabern and Bad Wildungen, with a short wait between for a connection to Kassel in Wabern. The Waldeck-Frankenberg district and the town of Bad Wildungen support the new direct services with an annual operating subsidy.

Since December 2024, trains between Kassel and Bad Wildungen have been running hourly. From 7 a.m. onwards, all trains run as RB/RE 39 directly to and from Kassel Hbf. From and to the south there are connections to the Regional-Express service between Kassel and Frankfurt am Main in Wabern.
