= Niederweimar station =

Railway station in Germany

Niederweimar
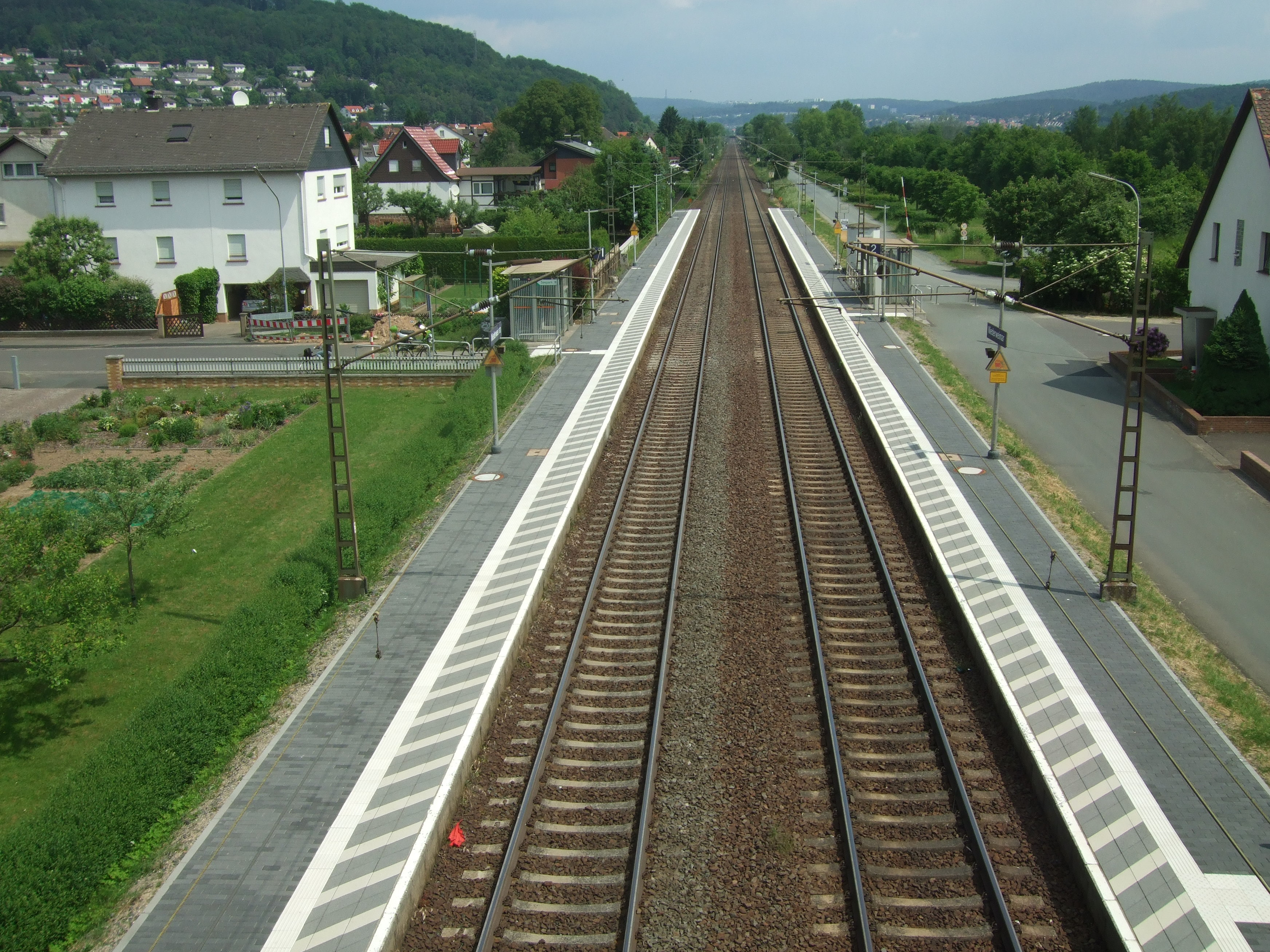

General information
- Location: Am Bahnhof 1; 35096 Weimar (Lahn), Hesse; Germany
- Coordinates: 50.7568°N 8.7339°E
- Owner: DB Netz
- Operator: DB Station&Service
- Line: Main–Weser Railway
- Platforms: 2 side platforms
- Tracks: 2
- Train operators: DB Regio Mitte

Other information
- Station code: 4538
- DS100 code: FNDW
- IBNR: 8004420
- Category: 6
- Fare zone: : 0578
- Website: www.bahnhof.de

Services
Preceding station	DB Regio Mitte	Following station
Marburg Süd towards Treysa	RB 41	Niederwalgern towards Frankfurt (Main) Hbf
Location
- Location within Hesse

Niederweimar station is a railway station in the Niederweimar district of Marburg-Biedenkopf in the Gießen administrative region in Hesse, Germany.
