= Weschnitz Valley Railway =

Overview
- Line number: 4104

Service
- Route number: 654

Technical
- Line length: 16.5 km (10.3 mi)
- Track gauge: 1,435 mm (4 ft 8 1/2 in)

The Weschnitz Valley Railway (German: Weschnitztalbahn) is a railway line in Germany that runs from Weinheim an der Bergstraße in the valley of the River Weschnitz to Fürth im Odenwald.
