= Volkmarsen–Vellmar-Obervellmar railway =

Railway line in Germany

Volkmarsen–Vellmar-Obervellmar
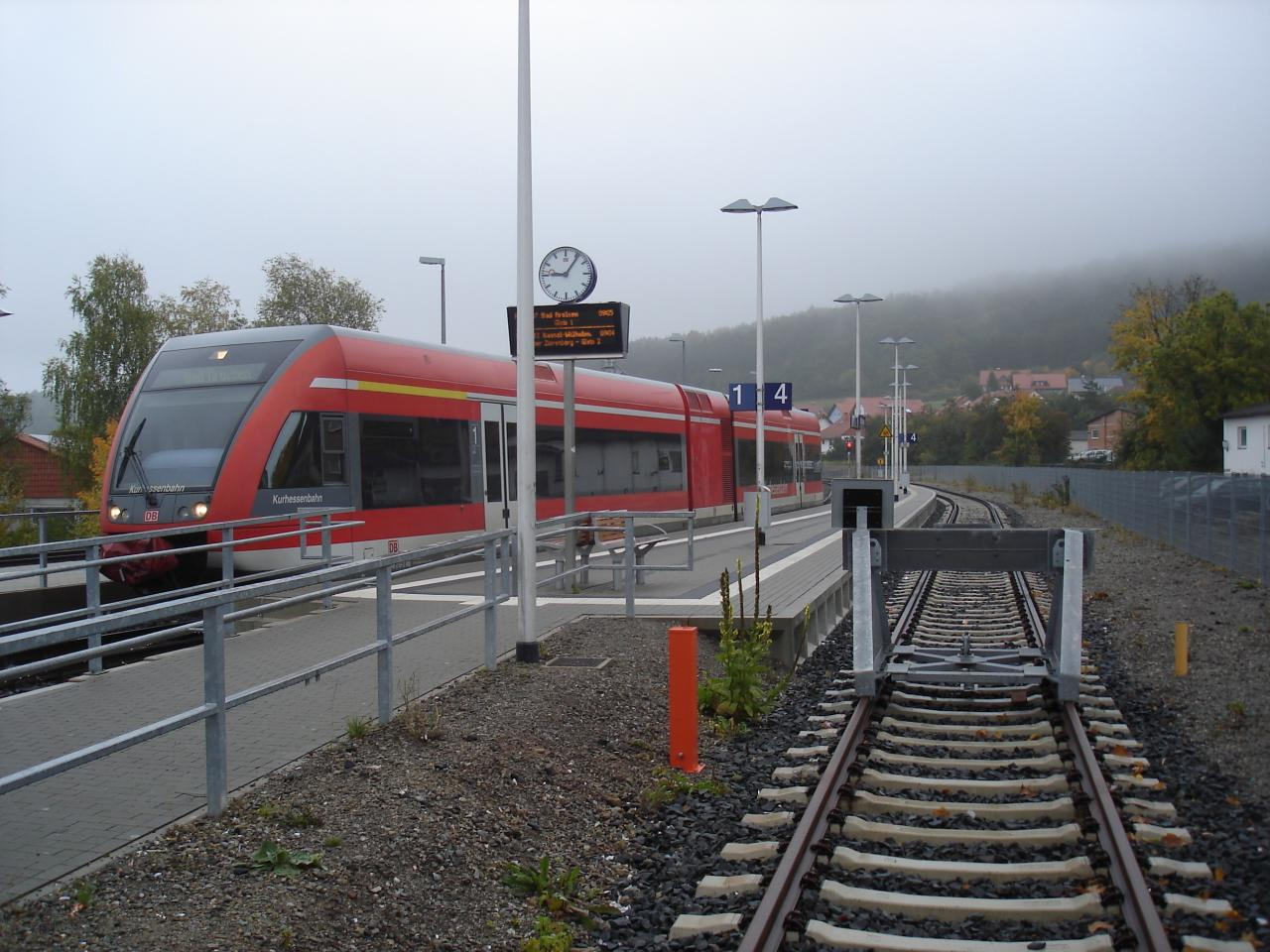
- Wolfhagen station in 2008

Overview
- Line number: 3903
- Locale: Hesse, Germany
- Termini: Volkmarsen; Vellmar-Obervellmar

Service
- Route number: 612

Technical
- Line length: 36.4 km (22.6 mi)
- Track gauge: 1,435 mm (4 ft 8 1/2 in) standard gauge

The Volkmarsen–Vellmar-Obervellmar railway runs from Volkmarsen via Wolfhagen and Zierenberg to Vellmar-Obervellmar, where it meets the Kassel–Warburg railway. It begins in Volkmarsen, where it branches off the Warburg–Sarnau railway. The whole line and almost all the railway buildings next to the line are under heritage protection.

== History ==
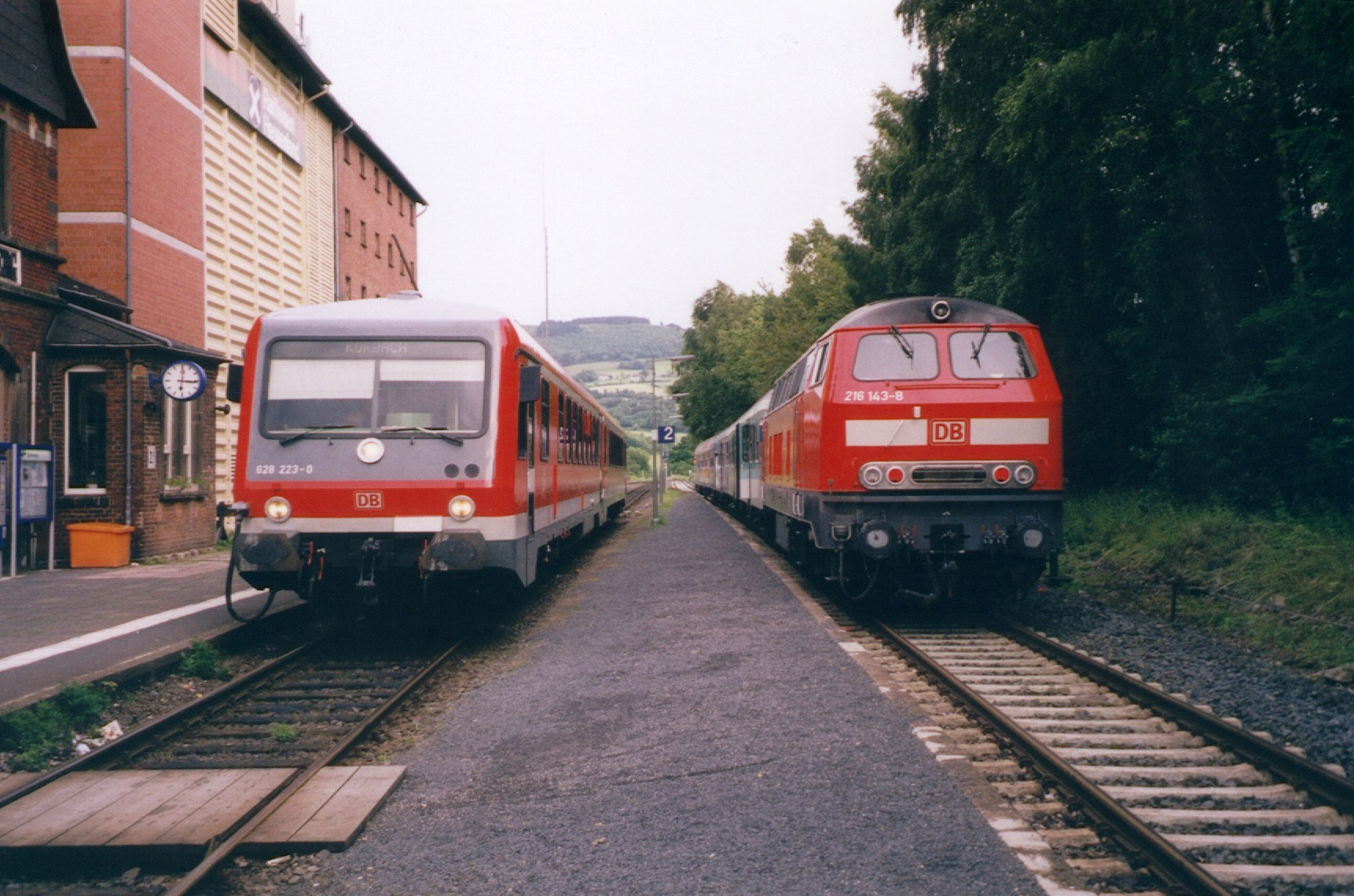
Train crossing in Zierenberg on 12 June 2002: 628 223 meets a push-pull train propelled by 216 143

After the Warburg–Volkmarsen section was closed in 1967 and the Korbach–Volkmarsen section were closed 1987, local rail passenger transport ended in Volkmarsen for around ten years. After the Warburg–Volkmarsen section was closed, the track to Obervellmar was integrated into the continuous main line through Volkmarsen station. Due to the redesign of the station, the change of line can only be recognised by the change in the route kilometre markings. After the route to Korbach was reactivated on 4 October 1998, there was continuous service from Korbach to Kassel, initially with hourly Regionalbahn trains. On 1 January 2002, the DB subsidiary Kurhessenbahn leased the infrastructure and took over the operation of the local passenger and freight traffic on the line. A service pattern with Regional-Express services between Kassel-Wilhelmshöhe and Korbach every two hours and Regionalbahn services between Kassel Hauptbahnhof and Korbach was then introduced. The Regionalbahn services ran every hour to Volkmarsen and every two hours to Korbach. Between 2003 and 2008, special trains that could only be used by soldiers ran from the Pommern barracks in Wolfhagen on Fridays via the 5 km-long siding to Wolfhagen and on to Kassel, and on Sundays in the opposite direction.

The line was extensively renovated from 28 May to 9 December 2006. Subsequently, the RegioTram began running hourly between Wolfhagen and Kassel Hauptbahnhof. In August 2007, the Regiotram trains were connected to downtown Kassel. Regio Citadis hybrid tram-trains are used, These run on diesel engines in the long-distance rail network and electrically with power supply from the catenary in the Kassel tram network. The change between the operating modes takes place during the stop at Kassel Hauptbahnhof. Until December 2013, the RT 4 trains on the inner-city ring route ran through Königsstraße and Königsplatz, among other places. Since December 2013, they have been running through Königsstraße to Holländischen Straße and turn around there. In addition to the RegioTram, Regional-Express trains run hourly between Kassel-Wilhelmshöhe and Korbach, stopping only in Obervellmar, Weimar and Zierenberg to Wolfhagen. First generation Stadler GTW and class 628 railcars are used for this.

=== Line upgrades since 2010 ===
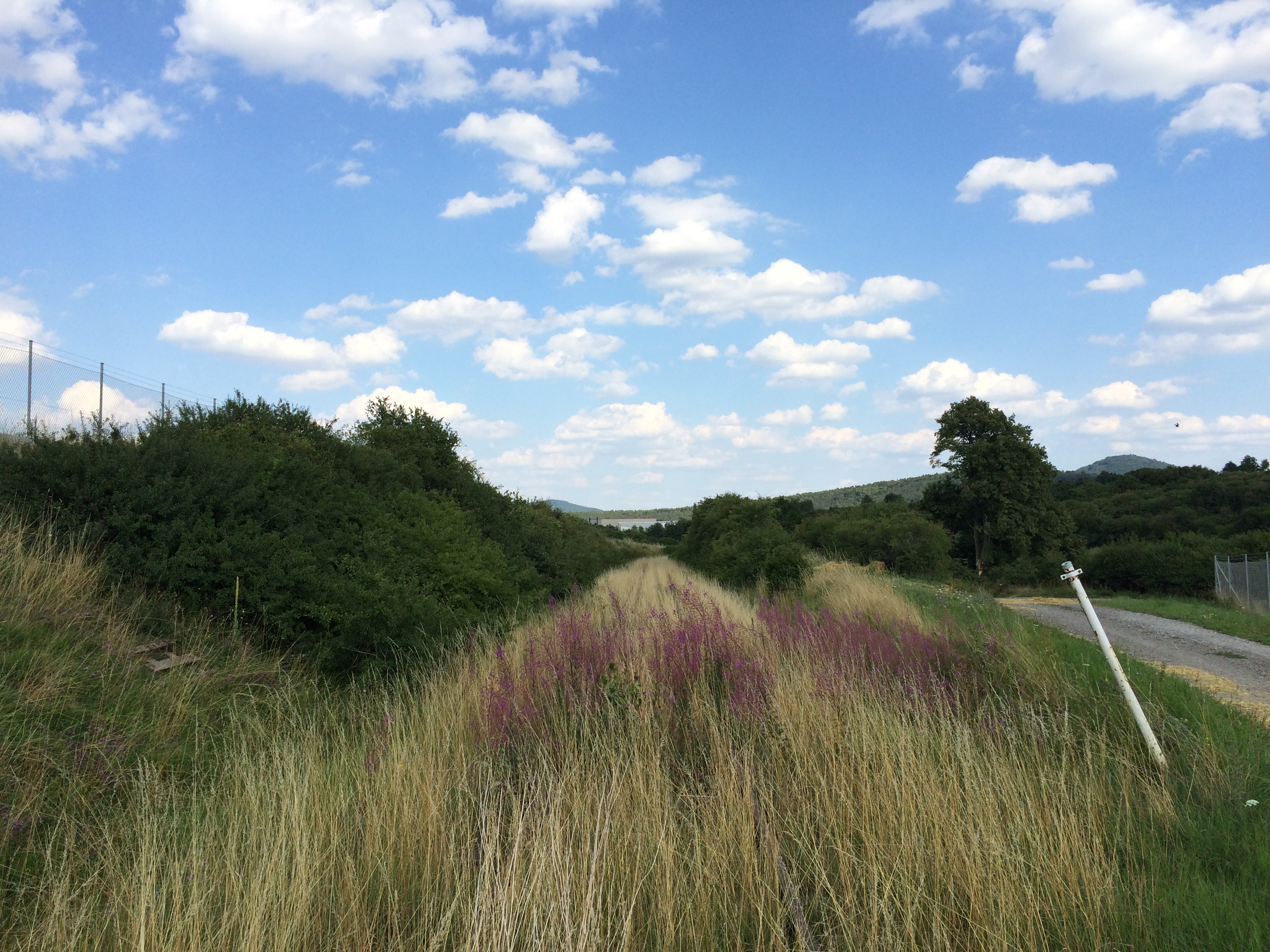
Disused siding to the Pomeranian barracks (2015)

From 2010 onwards, the railway line between Wolfhagen and Vellmar was upgraded. This allowed a half-hourly service to Zierenberg to be introduced on 15 December 2013 for the 2013/2014 timetable change. With the new RegioTram concept, the timetable on the line was completely redesigned. The RE services have different departure times and the travel time to Korbach has been reduced by ten minutes. In Zierenberg, the line offers short transfer times to the RegioTram to Kassel Hauptbahnhof and Kassel city centre.

Between Zierenberg and the village of Fürstenwald the line ran through the 815.5 m long, single-track Zierenberg tunnel, built between 1895 and 1897 . From October 2015, the new Zierenberg tunnel was built next to this tunnel, which is 900 m long and was put into operation as a replacement for the previous tunnel on 11 October 2018.

== Services ==
The route is now operated continuously from Korbach to Kassel via the Warburg–Sarnau and Volkmarsen–Obervellmar lines. Local passenger transport from Korbach is operated hourly by Regional-Express (RE) services of the Kurhessenbahn to Kassel-Wilhelmshöhe. Additional trains from Wolfhagen are offered by the RegioTram line RT 4 through central Kassel to Holländische Straße. This has run every hour, from Zierenberg every half hour, since December 2013. In Vellmar-Obervellmar there is a connection to the RT 1 to and from Hofgeismar-Hümme.

In March 2016, the Kurhessenbahn won the tender for the diesel network in Northwest Hesse and has been operating its existing network since December 2017 for another 15 years. The line is operated with Stadler GTW low-floor multiple units and 14 Siemens Desiro (class 642) sets.
