= Herborn (Dillkr) station =

Railway station in Herborn, Germany

Herborn (Dillkr)
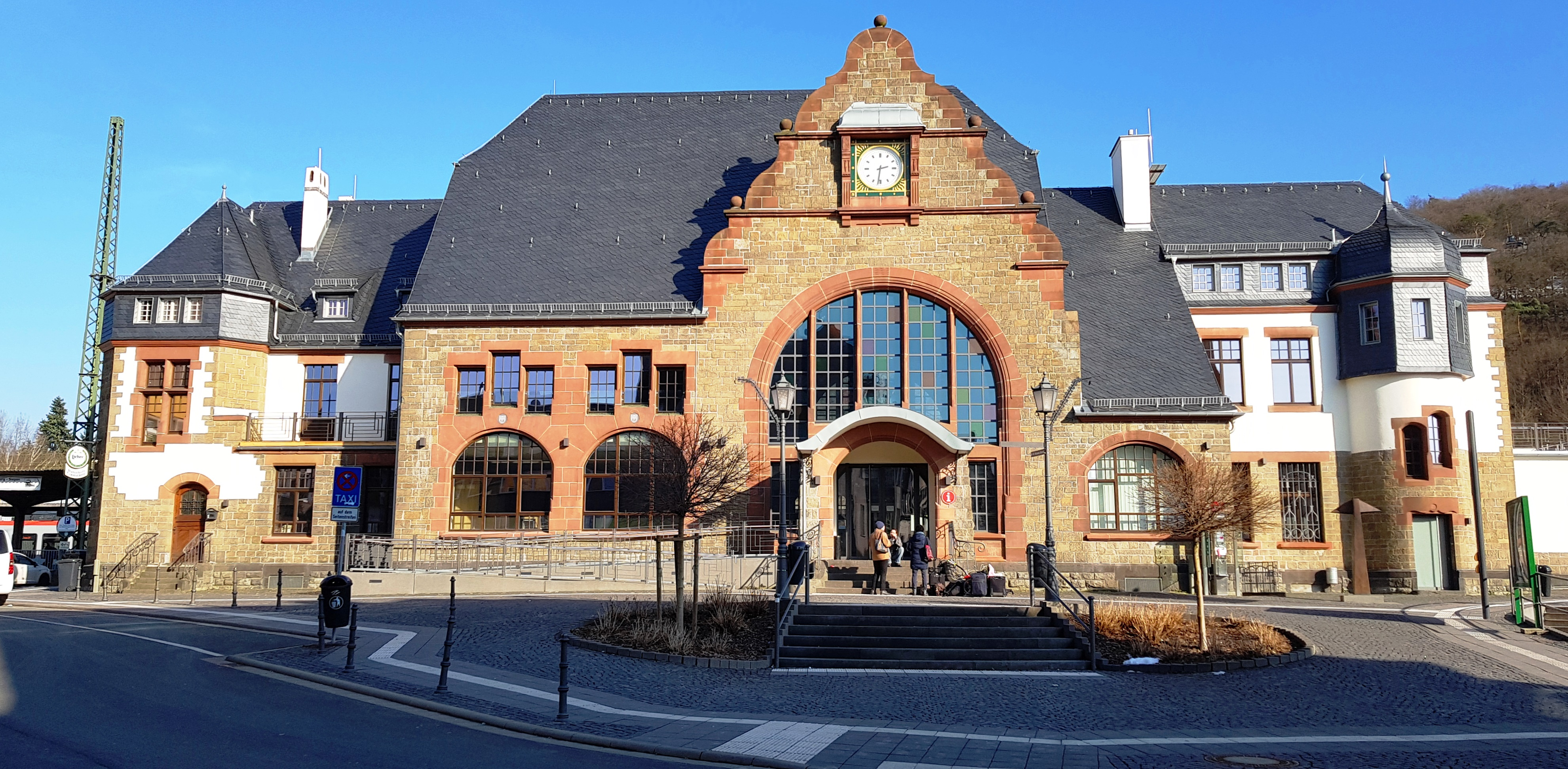

General information
- Location: Bahnhofsplatz 1, Herborn, Hesse; Germany
- Coordinates: 50°41′04″N 8°18′28″E
- Lines: Dill Railway: (Cologne/Siegen–)Dillenburg–Gießen (130.8 km); Cross Westerwald Railway : Herborn–Montabaur (0.0 km); Aar-Salzböde railway : Niederwalgern–Herborn (43.0 km)
- Platforms: 3 (formerly 5)

Construction
- Accessible: Platform 1 only
- Architectural style: Renaissance Revival

Other information
- Station code: 2701
- DS100 code: FHRB
- IBNR: 8000161
- Category: 4
- Fare zone: : 5701
- Website: www.bahnhof.de

History
- Opened: 12 January 1862

Services
Preceding station	Hessische Landesbahn	Following station
Dillenburg towards Siegen Hbf	RE 99	Wetzlar towards Frankfurt (Main) Hbf
Preceding station	DB Regio Mitte	Following station
Burg (Dillkr) Nord towards Dillenburg	RB 40	Sinn towards Frankfurt (Main) Hbf
Location
- Location within Hesse Location within Germany Location within Europe

Herborn (Dillkreis) station is a railway station in the town of Herborn in the German state of Hesse on the Dill Railway (built as part of the former Deutz–Gießen railway). The station is classified by Deutsche Bahn (DB) as a category 4 station.

== History ==
The station was built as a station on the Deutz–Gießen railway. Services over the whole line commenced on 12 January 1862.

== Entrance building ==
The entrance building was built in the Renaissance Revival style and is built next to the post office and the two buildings together dominate the station forecourt. The design is by the architect Ludwig Hoffmann. The building was built in 1908 after a great fire in 1904 and replaced the original building of 1862. The station building of 1908 is thus a building of the "second generation" of structural engineering on the line. It had become necessary because the old station building was no longer sufficient with the opening of two branch lines.

The station building is built to an asymmetrical floor plan. It is dominated by a rugged, slate-covered roof. On the street side is the facade with eccentrically mounted, large arched windows dominated by an outstanding Renaissance Revival gable. This is the location of the entrance from the street. The station building is now listed as a monument under the Hessian Heritage Act.

The station building is still partly occupied by a restaurant and a retail kiosk. Tickets can be purchased at the kiosk and from vending machines. The station building has been extensively refurbished since 2015.

== Operations ==
The station has a “home” platform (next to the station building) and an island platform with two faces. Another island platform together with two tracks, previously served traffic on two now disused branch lines, which were adjacent to the east. The tracks have been dismantled and the area now forms an industrial wasteland.

Today, the station is served by Regional-Express trains on the Siegen–Gießen–Frankfurt route (Main-Sieg-Express, RE 99) and Regionalbahn services on the Dillenburg-Frankfurt route (Mittelhessen-Express, RB 40, running as stopping trains between Dillenburg and Gießen). The public transport is operated under contract to the Rhein-Main-Verkehrsverbund (Rhine-Main Transport Association, RMV) by DB Regio and Hessische Landesbahn.

Previously the station was served by two other lines:

- services on the Aar-Salzböde railway from Niederwalgern started and ended here from 1902 to 2001,
- services on the Cross Westerwald Railway (Westerwaldquerbahn) to Montabaur started and ended here from 1906 to 1980.

The station is no longer staffed.
