= Fulda–Gersfeld Railway =

German railway line

Coordinates: 50.4494°N 9.9145°E

Fulda–Gersfeld
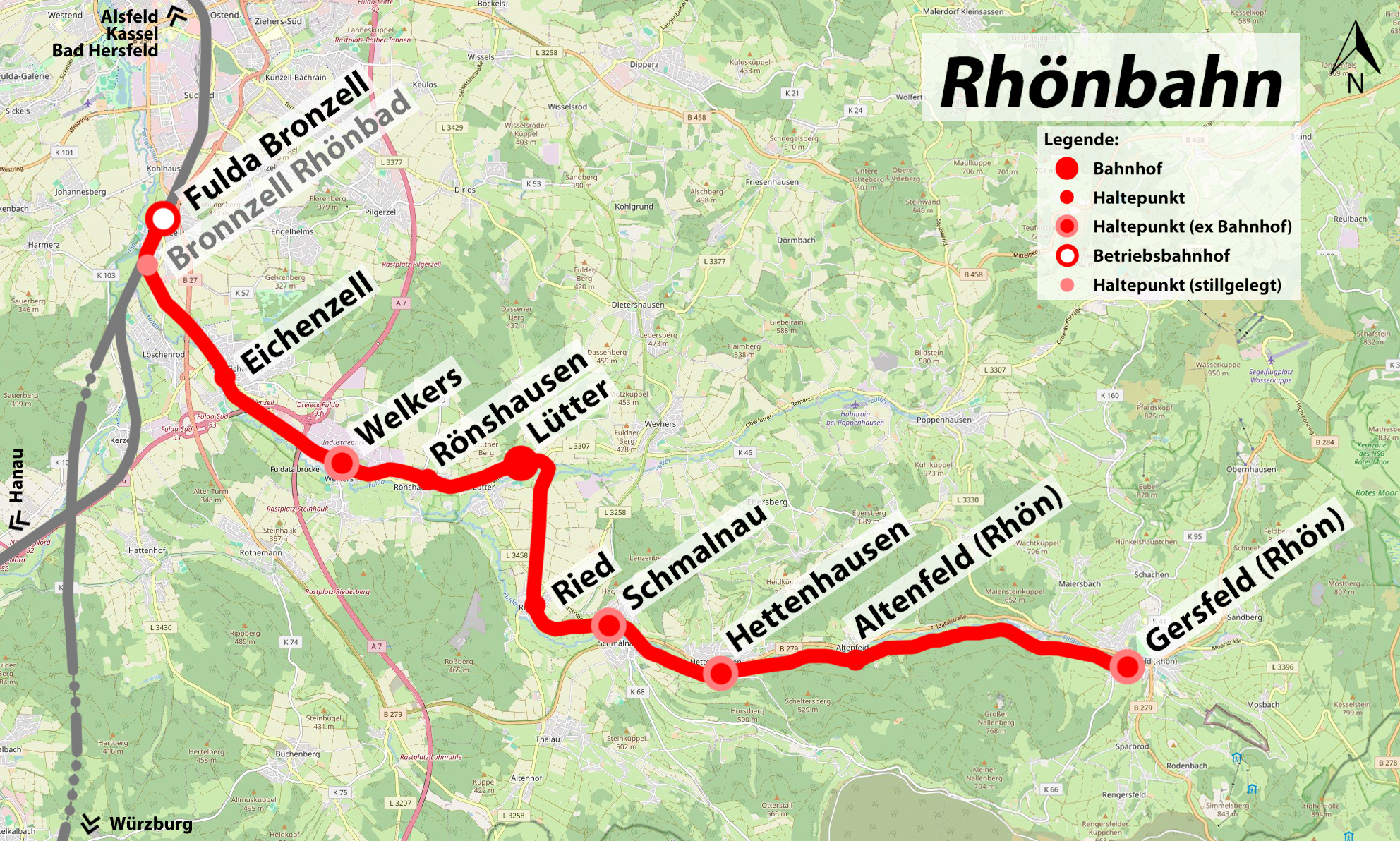

Overview
- Line number: 3824 (Germany)

Service
- Route number: 616 (Germany)

Technical
- Line length: 23.4 km
- Track gauge: 1435 mm
- Operating speed: 120 km/h max.

The Fulda–Gersfeld Railway (German: Bahnstrecke Fulda–Gersfeld), also called the Rhön Railway (German: Rhönbahn), is a railway line in the state of Hesse, Germany. It connects Fulda in the west with Gersfeld, in the Rhön Mountains, in the east. The line was opened by the Prussian state railways on October 1, 1888, and as of November 2014 is operated by the Hessische Landesbahn using Alstom Coradia LINT 41 trainsets.
