= Soden Railway =

Railway line in Germany

Bad Soden–Frankfurt-Höchst
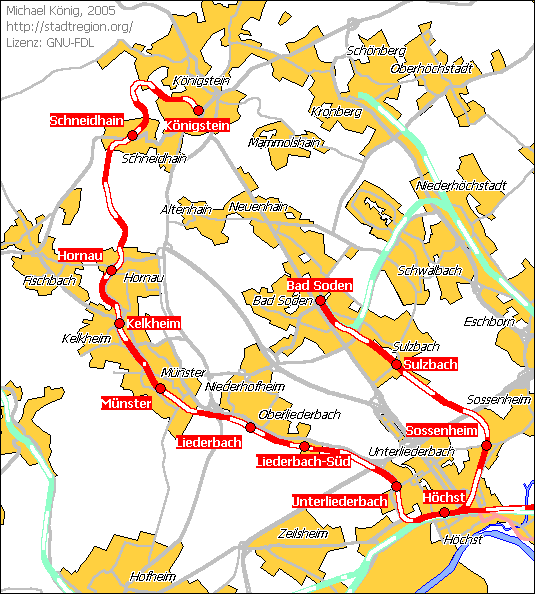
- Course of the Soden Railway and the nearby Königstein Railway

Overview
- Line number: 3640
- Locale: Hesse, Germany

Service
- Route number: 643

Technical
- Line length: 6.6 km (4.1 mi)
- Track gauge: 1,435 mm (4 ft 8 1/2 in) standard gauge
- Electrification: 15 kV/16.7 Hz AC overhead catenary

The Soden Railway is a line in the western suburbs of Frankfurt am Main and was one of the oldest railways in Germany, opened in 1847. The line has been closed since 28 March 2024, due to construction works of the Regionaltangente West and its services have been replaced by express buses. The line is set to reopen in 2028.

== Route ==
The Soden Railway runs from Frankfurt-Höchst to Bad Soden am Taunus and is 6.6 km long. It was also called the Höchst–Soden Railway. The line has timetable route number 643 and is operated as line RB 11 of the Rhein-Main-Verkehrsverbund.

== History ==
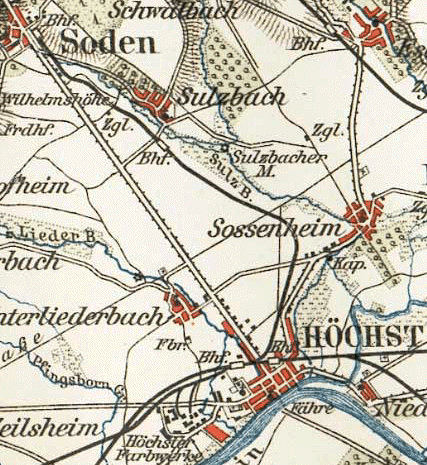
In 1893 the line ran largely through open fields.

The line was opened on 22 May 1847 and is might be described as the first German branch line. In Höchst it connects with the Taunus Railway opened in 1839 from Frankfurt to Wiesbaden. It was built to connect the emerging spa town of Soden to the new rail network. The builder and owner of the line was the Soden Company (German: Sodener Actien-Gesellschaft). The line was managed from the beginning by the Taunus Railway Company.

Since 1972, there has been a connection in Bad Soden to the Limes Railway to Niederhöchstadt, which connects Bad Soden with the Rhine-Main S-Bahn network.

== Operations ==
The railway was originally only operated in the summer months. In 1860 the operating company stopped operations and demanded subsidies from the Nassau Government, which refused. Operations only resumed on 1 October 1863 after the track had been sold to the Taunus Railway Company for 100,000 guilders. On 1 January 1872 the Soden Railway was sold to the Prussian state railways and subsequently ran all year.

From 1979 to 1997 Soden Railway formed part of S-Bahn line S3. In addition, the line was electrified. Train patronage was very poor, so S-Bahn services were abandoned.

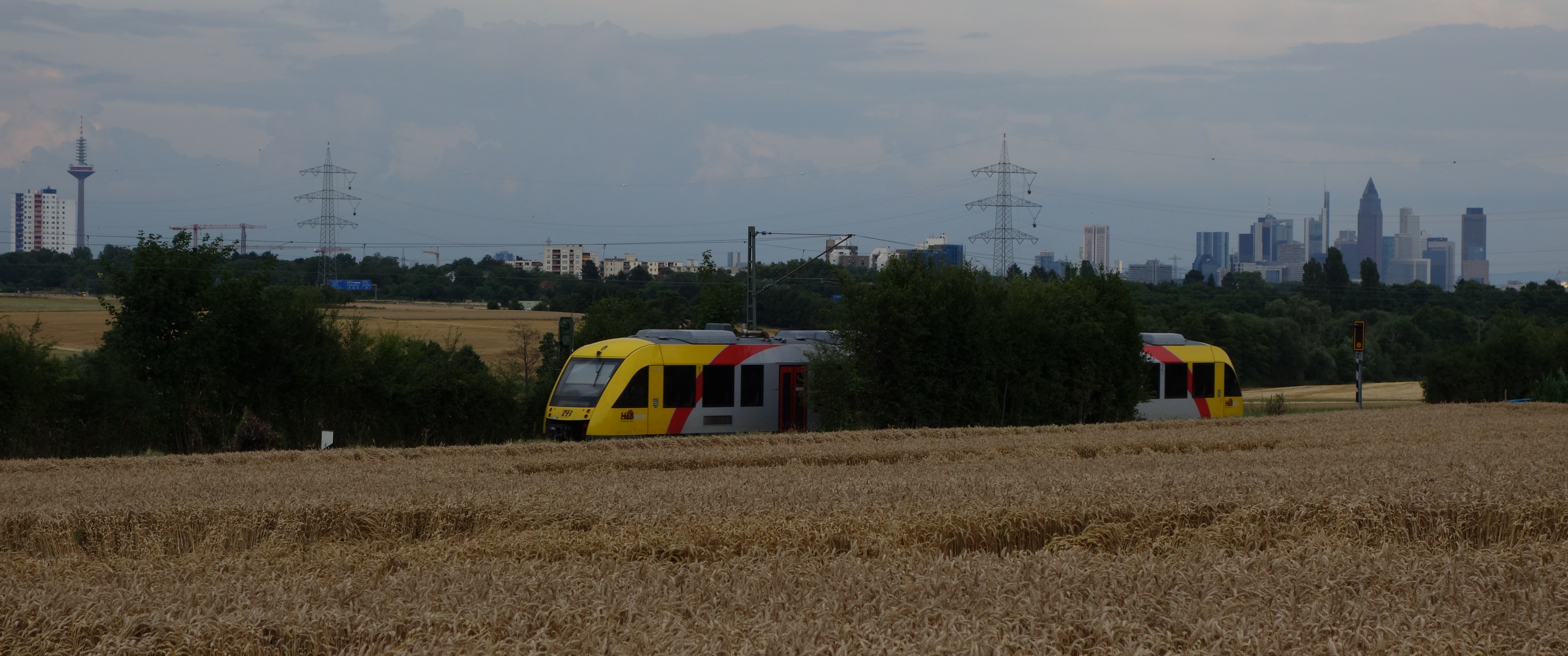
LINT 41 passing the fields between Sulzbach and Sossenheim

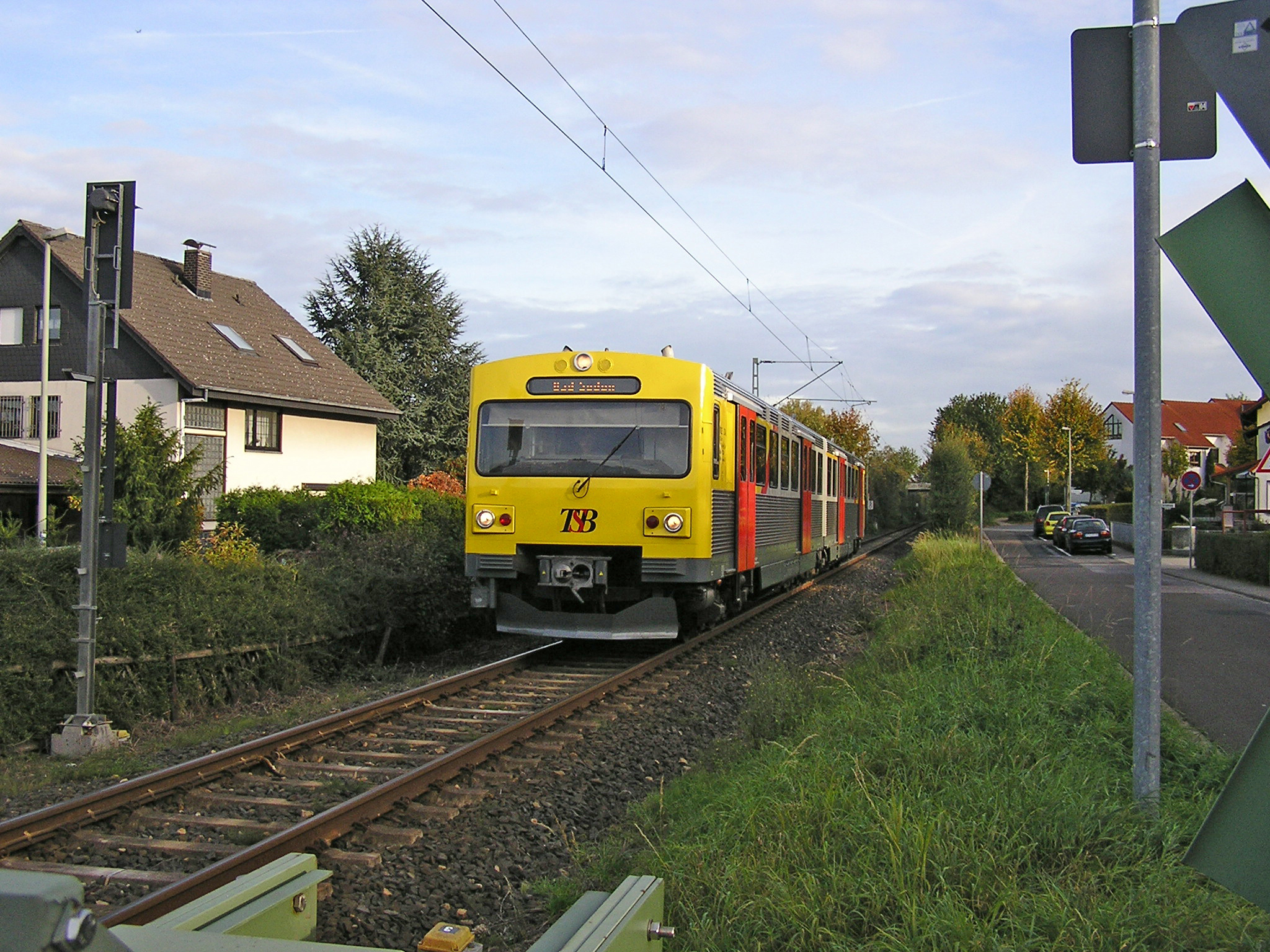
VT2E in Sulzbach

From 1997, the Frankfurt-Königsteiner Eisenbahn operated the line. These operations have since been rebranded as Hessische Landesbahn (Hessian State Railways). Despite the fact that the line is electrified, it had been operated, along with the Hessische Landesbahn's other routes through the Taunus, by a diesel multiple unit for many years (usually a LHB VT 2E, sometimes a LINT). Since 2019, the line has been operated by electrical multiple units (Alstom Coradia Continental)

== Future ==
The section south of the A 66 autobahn would form part of the proposed Regionalstadtbahn Regionaltangente West line through the western fringes of Frankfurt. If built, this would have a new station called Zuckschwerdtstraße.
