= Großenlüder =

- Municipality
- Coat of arms

- Location of Großenlüder within Fulda district
- Interactive map of Großenlüder
- Location within Germany Location within Hesse
- Coordinates: 50°35′N 09°32′E
- Country: Germany
- State: Hesse
- Admin. region: Kassel
- District: Fulda

Government
  - Mayor (2020–26): Florian Fritzsch

Area
  - Total: 73.92 km^{2} (28.54 sq mi)
- Elevation: 251 m (823 ft)

Population (2025-12-31)
  - Total: 8,631
  - Density: 116.8/km^{2} (302.4/sq mi)
- Time zone: UTC+01:00 (CET)
  - Summer (DST): UTC+02:00 (CEST)
- Postal codes: 36137
- Dialling codes: 06648
- Vehicle registration: FD
- Website: www.grossenlueder.de

Großenlüder is a municipality in the district of Fulda, in Hesse, Germany.
