= Marburg Süd station =

Railway station in Marburg, Germany

Marburg Süd
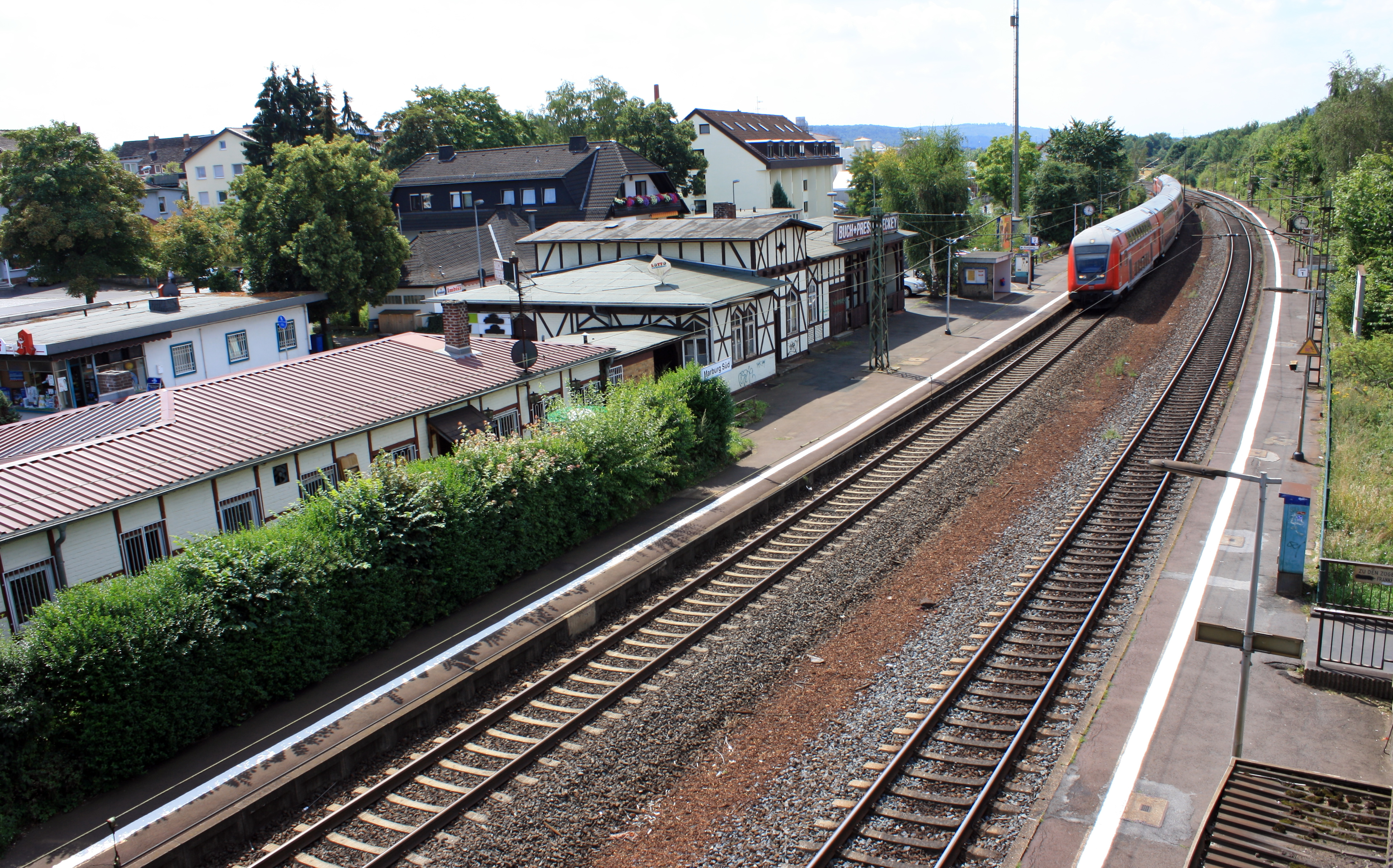
- Marburg Südbahnhof

General information
- Location: Frauenbergstr. 1, Marburg, Hesse; Germany
- Coordinates: 50°47′42″N 8°45′46″E
- Owner: DB Netz
- Operator: DB Station&Service
- Line: Main-Weser Railway
- Platforms: 2 side platforms
- Tracks: 2

Other information
- Station code: 3944
- DS100 code: FMBS
- IBNR: 8003856
- Category: 5
- Fare zone: : 0501
- Website: www.bahnhof.de

Services
Preceding station	DB Regio Mitte	Following station
Marburg towards Treysa	RB 41	Niederweimar towards Frankfurt (Main) Hbf
Preceding station	Hessische Landesbahn	Following station
Marburg towards Kassel Hbf	RE 98	Niederweimar towards Frankfurt (Main) Hbf
Location
- Location within Hesse

Marburg Süd railway station (German: Marburg Südbahnhof) is a train station in the south of Marburg in Hesse on the Main-Weser Railway.
