= Rosbach (disambiguation) =

Rosbach vor der Höhe is a town in Hesse, Germany.

Rosbach may also refer to:

== Places ==
- Rosbach vor der Höhe station, a railway station at Rosbach vor der Höhe
- Rosbach, part of the municipality of Windeck in Northrhine-Westphalia, Germany
  - Rosbach station, a railway station at Rosbach (Windeck)
- Rosbach (Nidda), a river in Hesse, Germany

== People ==
- Anna Rosbach (born 1947), Danish politician
- Johan Hammond Rosbach (1921–2004), Norwegian author
- Wilma Rosbach (1921–2018), American politician

== See also ==
- Rossbach (disambiguation), or Roßbach
- Rosbash
