= Rossbach =

Rossbach or Roßbach may refer to:

The place Rossbach, the name of which means "horse brook".

Rossbach is a surname of German origin. It means "horse brook".

== Places ==
- Roßbach (Braunsbedra), part of the town Braunsbedra, Saxony-Anhalt, Germany
  - Battle of Rossbach, fought 1757
- Roßbach, Austria, a municipality in Upper Austria
- Roßbach, Bavaria, a town in Germany
- Roßbach, Neuwied, a municipality in Rhineland-Palatinate, Germany
- Roßbach, Westerwaldkreis, a municipality in Rhineland-Palatinate, Germany
- Rosbach vor der Höhe, a town in Hesse, Germany
- Rossbach, German name of Hranice (Cheb District), Czech Republic

== People ==
- Ed Rossbach (1914–2002), American fiber artist
- Einar Rossbach (born 1964), Norwegian football goalkeeper
- Gerhard Rossbach (1893–1967), German soldier

== Other uses ==
- Wolf pack Rossbach, a group of German U-boats during the Battle of the Atlantic in World War II

== See also ==
- Rosbach (disambiguation)
