= Rodheim vor der Höhe station =

Railway station in Germany

Rodheim v d Höhe
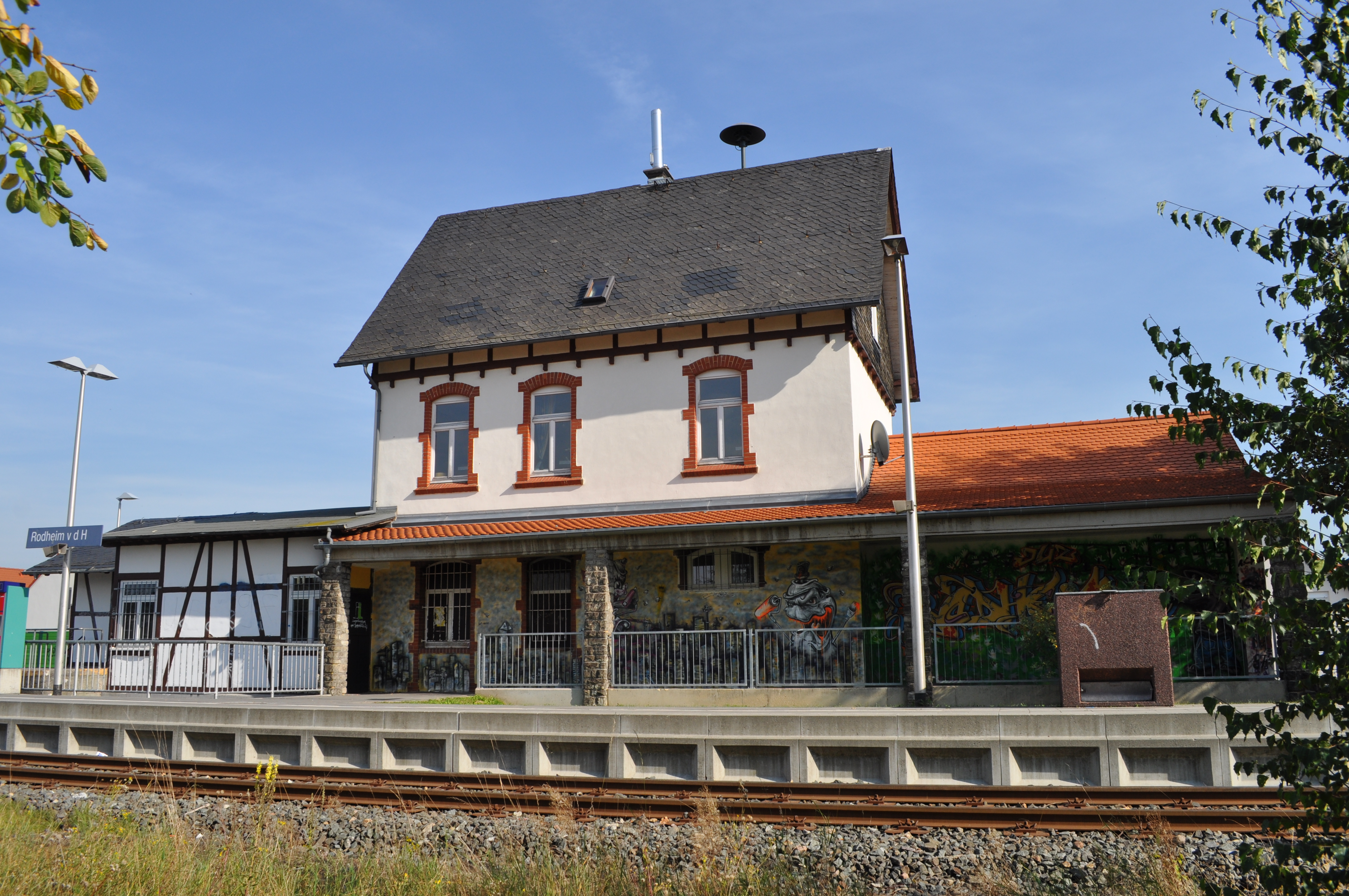

General information
- Location: Hauptstraße 80; 61191 Rosbach vor der Höhe, Hesse; Germany
- Coordinates: 50.2677°N 8.6960°E
- Owner: DB Netz
- Operator: DB Station&Service
- Line: Friedberg–Friedrichsdorf railway
- Platforms: 1 side platform
- Tracks: 1
- Train operators: DB Regio Mitte

Construction
- Accessible: Yes

Other information
- Station code: 5342
- DS100 code: FRO
- IBNR: 8005163
- Category: 6
- Fare zone: : 2650
- Website: www.bahnhof.de

Services
Preceding station	DB Regio Mitte	Following station
Rosbach vor der Höhe towards Friedberg	RB 16	Burgholzhausen vor der Höhe towards Friedrichsdorf or Bad Homburg
Location
- Location within Hesse

Rodheim vor der Höhe station is a railway station in the Rodheim vor der Höhe district of Rosbach vor der Höhe, located in the Wetteraukreis district in Hesse, Germany.
