= Burgholzhausen vor der Höhe station =

Railway station in Germany

Burgholzhausen v d Höhe
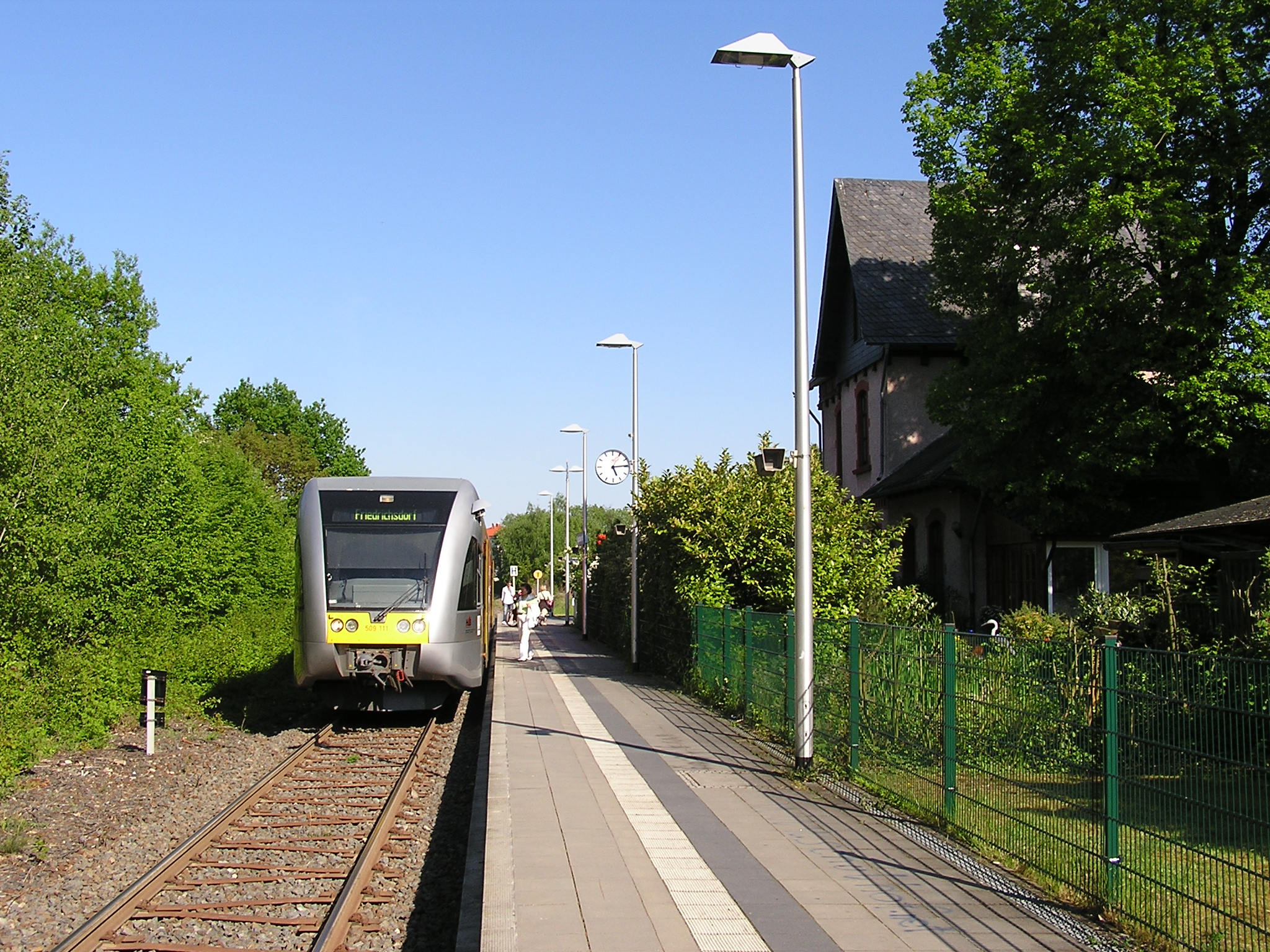

General information
- Location: Wilhelm-Reuter-Weg 19; 61191 Friedrichsdorf; Hesse; Germany
- Coordinates: 50.2578°N 8.6768°E
- Owner: DB Netz
- Operator: DB Station&Service
- Line: Friedberg–Friedrichsdorf railway
- Platforms: 1 side platform
- Tracks: 1
- Train operators: DB Regio Mitte

Construction
- Accessible: Yes

Other information
- Station code: 987
- DS100 code: FBGH
- IBNR: 8001287
- Category: 6
- Fare zone: : 5125
- Website: www.bahnhof.de

Services
Preceding station	DB Regio Mitte	Following station
Rodheim vor der Höhe towards Friedberg	RB 16	Friedrichsdorf towards Friedrichsdorf or Bad Homburg
Location
- Location within Hesse

Burgholzhausen vor der Höhe station is a railway station in the Burgholzhausen vor der Höhe district of Friedrichsdorf, located in the Wetteraukreis district in Hesse, Germany.
