= Fahrenbach (Rosbach) =

River in Germany

Location
- Country: Germany
- State: Hesse

Physical characteristics
- Source
  - coordinates: 50°18′48″N 8°39′41″E
- Mouth
  - location: Rosbach
  - coordinates: 50.3024°N 8.6979°E

Basin features
- Progression: Rosbach→ Nidda→ Main→ Rhine→ North Sea

Fahrenbach is a small river of Hesse, Germany. It flows into the Rosbach in Rosbach vor der Höhe.

== See also ==
- List of rivers of Hesse
