= Philipp-Reis-Schule, Friedrichsdorf =

Philipp-Reis-Schule

Location
- Färberstraße 10; 61381 Friedrichsdorf; Hochtaunuskreis; Hesse; Germany
- Coordinates: 50°15′37″N 8°38′05″E

Information
- School type: Public Gesamtschule (comprehensive school)
- Founded: 1836; 190 years ago
- School number: 6110
- Head of school: Frauke Piorreck
- Grades: 5–13
- Gender: Coeducational
- Website: www.philipp-reis-schule.de
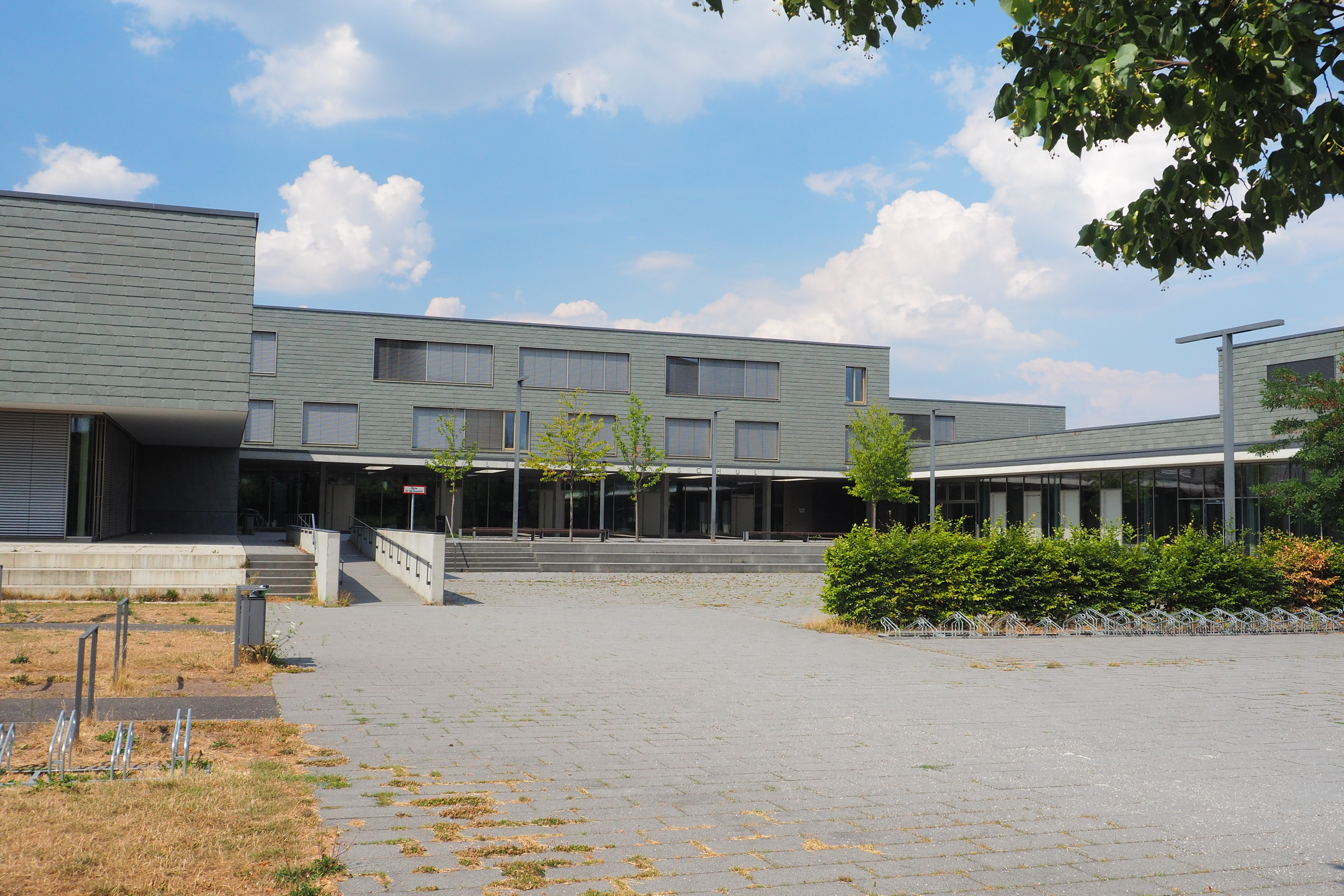

The Philipp-Reis-Schule (abbreviation: PRS; English: Philipp Reis School) is a comprehensive school and one of two secondary schools, the other being King's College, The British School of Frankfurt, in Friedrichsdorf, Hesse, Germany.

The eponym is Philipp Reis (1834–1874). The school has approximately 150 teachers and 1,900 students. In school year 2006/2007 the school time at the Gymnasium at the Philipp-Reis-Schule was reduced from nine to eight years. So the students get their Abitur after twelve school years in total, rather than thirteen years as it was previously. This modification has been cancelled, so the students get their Abitur after thirteen school years in total.
