= Friedrichsdorf =

- Town
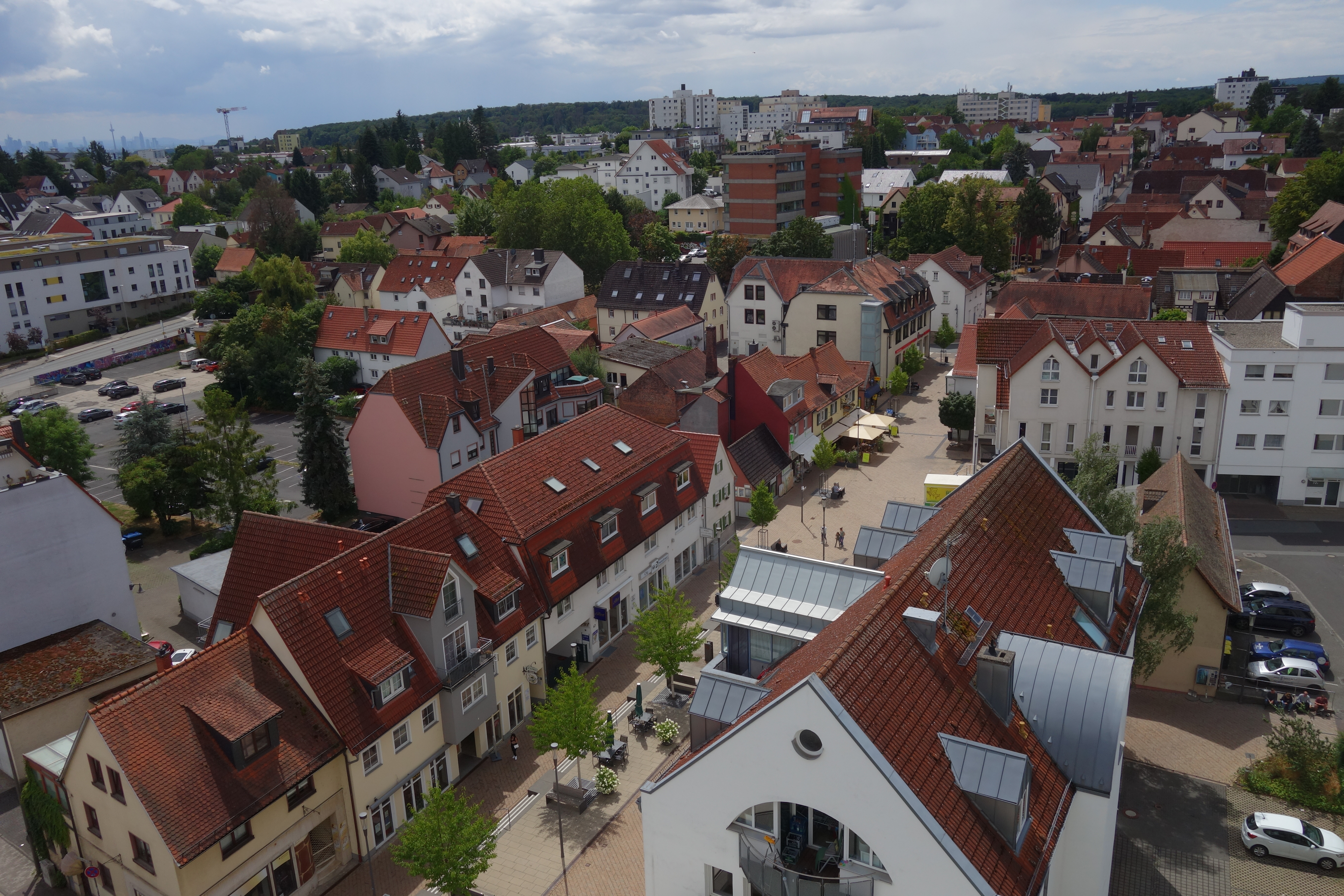
- View over Friedrichsdorf from the roof of Salus Klinik

- Flag Coat of arms

- Location of Friedrichsdorf within Hochtaunuskreis district
- Interactive map of Friedrichsdorf
- Location within Germany Location within Hesse
- Coordinates: 50°15′20″N 8°38′23″E
- Country: Germany
- State: Hesse
- District: Hochtaunuskreis
- Subdivisions: 4 Stadtteile

Government
  - Mayor (2021–27): Lars Keitel (Greens)

Area
  - Total: 30.13 km^{2} (11.63 sq mi)
- Elevation: 200 m (660 ft)

Population (2025-12-31)
  - Total: 26,054
  - Density: 864.7/km^{2} (2,240/sq mi)
- Time zone: UTC+01:00 (CET)
  - Summer (DST): UTC+02:00 (CEST)
- Postal codes: 61381
- Dialling codes: 06172 (Friedrichsdorf, Dillingen, Seulberg), 06175 (Köppern) und 06007 (Burgholzhausen)
- Vehicle registration: HG, USI
- Website: www.friedrichsdorf.de

Friedrichsdorf (German pronunciation: [ˈfʁiːdʁɪçsˌdɔʁf]) is a town of the Hochtaunuskreis, some 20 km (12 mi) north of Frankfurt am Main in Hesse, Germany.

== Geography ==
=== Location ===
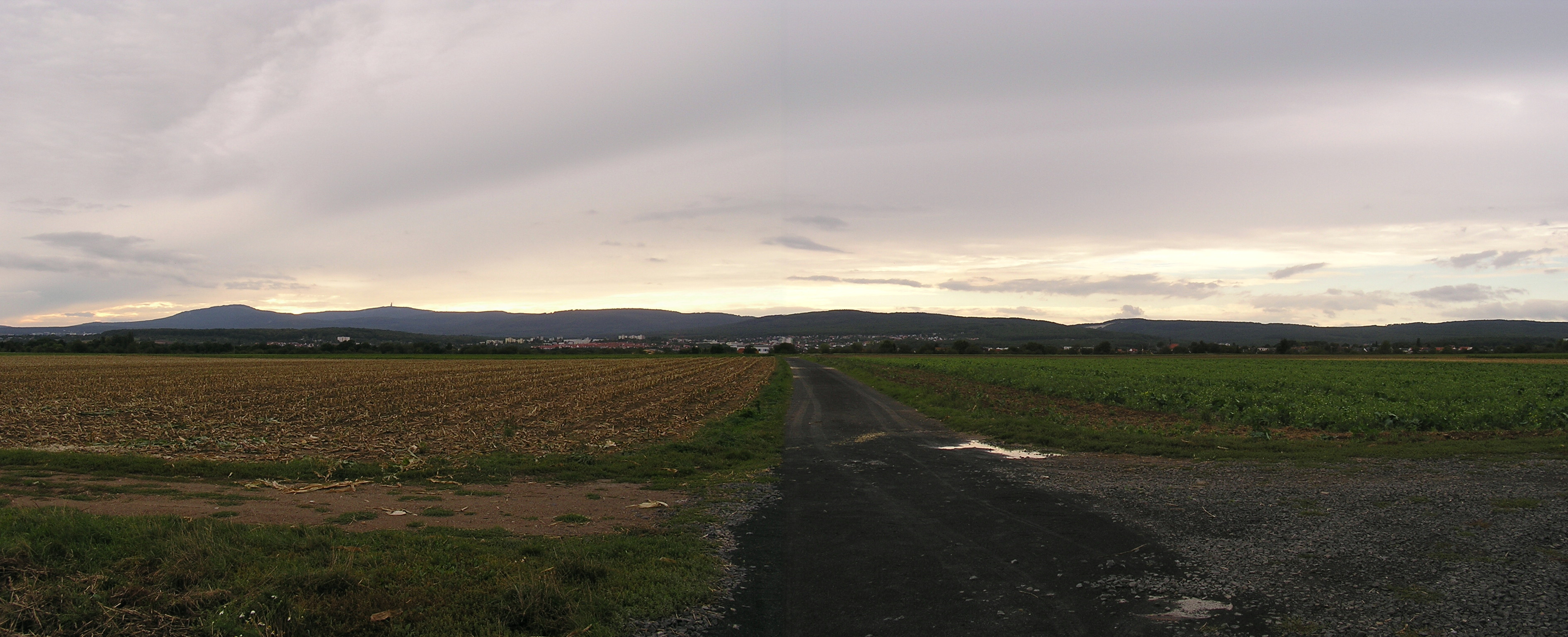
Friedrichsdorf im Taunus

Friedrichsdorf is located in the Taunus area, ranking third among the Hochtaunuskreis boroughs after Bad Homburg vor der Höhe and Oberursel (Taunus). The municipal area includes, on the one hand, agricultural land such as that between Burgholzhausen and the edge of the Wetterau. On the other hand, there are vast woodlands on the crest of the Taunus, where the highest point in Friedrichsdorf's rural areas can be found: the Gickelsburg at 471 m above sea level. From the Taunus' heights, the river Erlenbach makes its way down and through town.

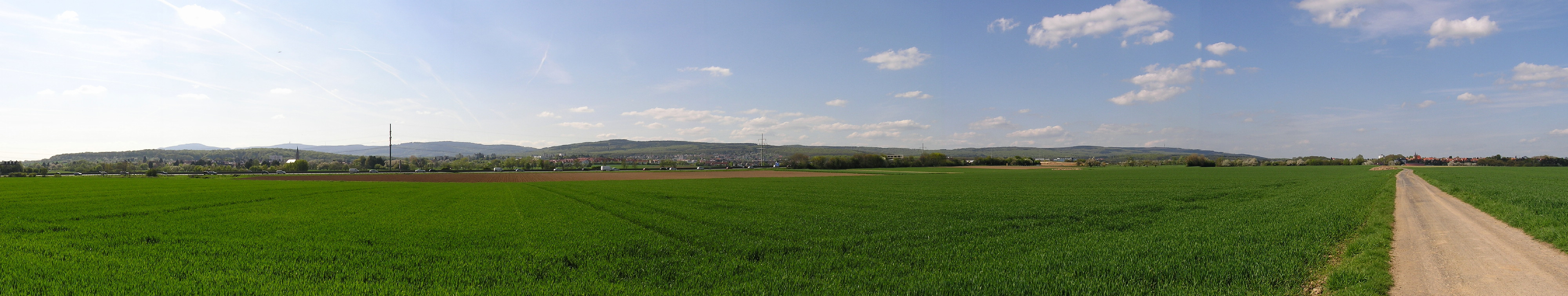
Friedrichsdorf (in spring)

=== Neighbouring communities ===
Friedrichsdorf borders in the north and east on the town of Rosbach (Wetteraukreis), in the south on the town of Bad Homburg, and in the west on the community of Wehrheim.

== History ==
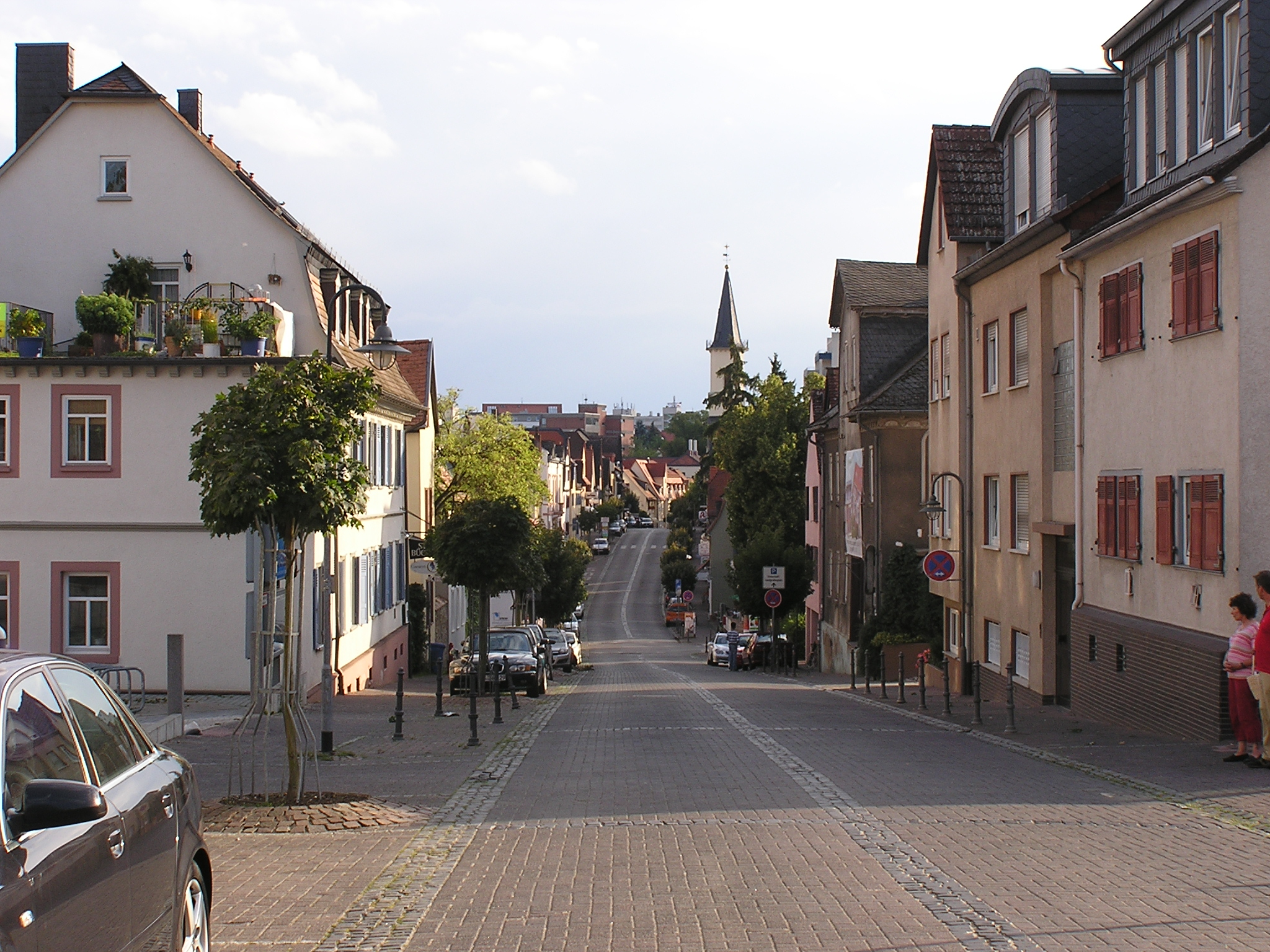
Part of Hugenottenstraße (Huguenots street)

The town's founding in 1687 goes back to the persecution of the Huguenots in France, where millions of them fled their country. Part of this exodus was granted asylum by Landgrave Friedrich II with the words "Lieber will ich mein Silbergerät verkaufen, als diesen armen Leuten die Aufnahme versagen" ("I would rather sell my silverware than deny these poor people asylum."). The Huguenots then founded Friedrichsdorf, gratefully naming it after the Landgrave. They brought flannel and stockings with them from France, which spread quickly.

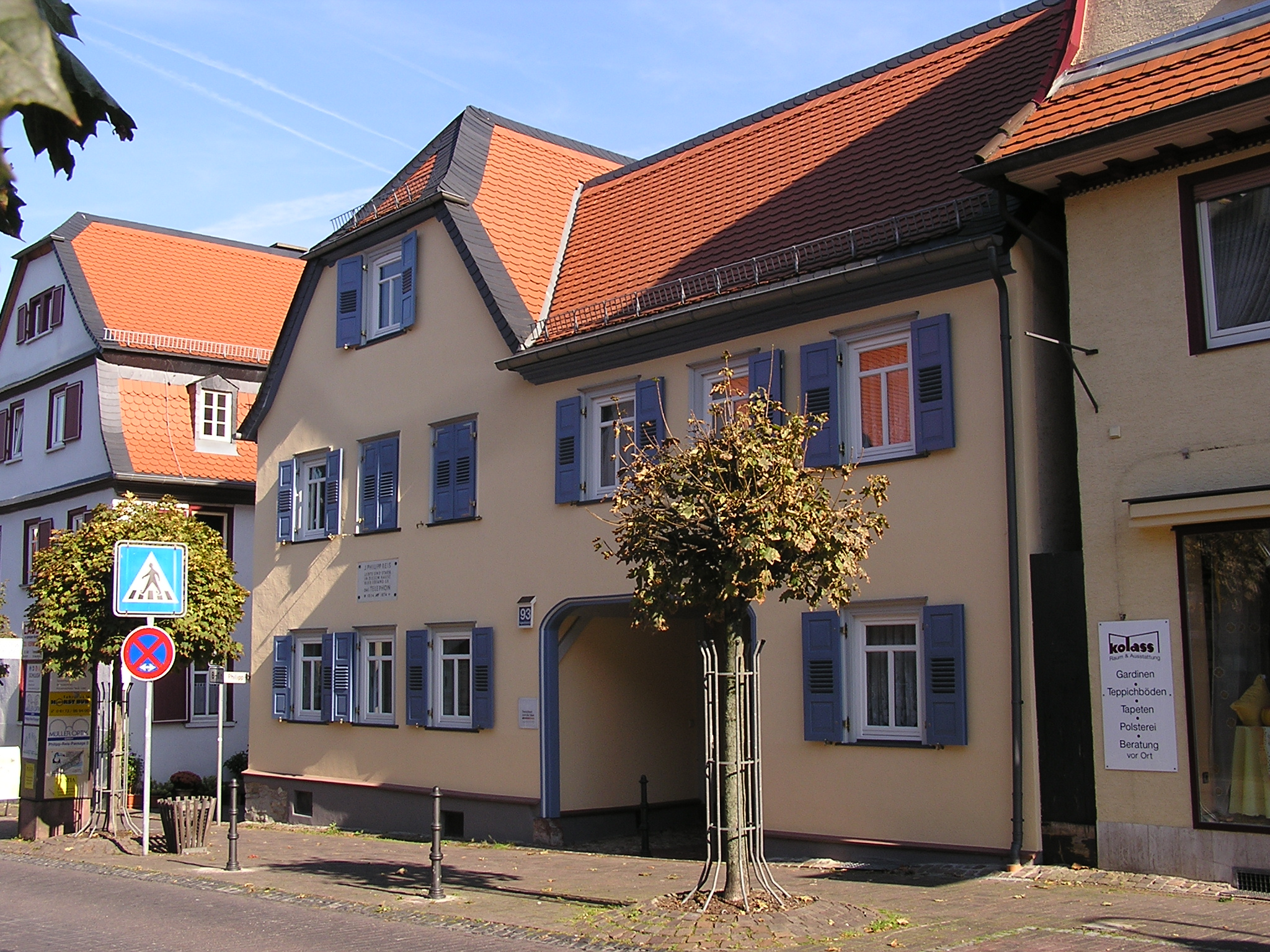
Reis' house in Friedrichsdorf, now a museum

Later, Zwieback was produced in Friedrichsdorf, which is why Friedrichsdorf is known as the "Town of Zwieback". The zwieback factory "Emil Louis Pauly" became Milupa, still in business now as a baby food maker, and still headquartered in Friedrichsdorf. It is now owned by Numico, a Dutch company, and the production facilities have been moved abroad.

The town's most famous son was Johann Philipp Reis, a teacher at the Institut Garnier. He is the inventor of the electric transmission of speech, better known as the telephone and has been dedicated a museum. Friedrichsdorf's comprehensive school (Philipp-Reis-Schule) is also named after him.

In 1916, Dillingen, which had been founded only in 1804, was joined with Friedrichsdorf. Dillingen took its name from a village which had been forsaken in the Thirty Years' War, on the rural area of which Friedrichsdorf's Huguenots later settled. Paul Tirard reported that the town archives were kept in French up until 1871, but thenceforth in German. He also states that the names on grave stones were French up and till 1914 and that Protestant Sunday services were held locally up until the same date.

== Constituent communities ==
In July 1972 the communities of Friedrichsdorf, Seulberg, Köppern and Burgholzhausen merged to form the town of Friedrichsdorf/Taunus.

=== Köppern ===
Köppern had its first documentary mention in 1269. At this time, Buchard von Printsac was given in fief a watermill at "coppern" by Count Gerhard von Eppstein. Linen weaving and brickmaking were for a long time, next to farming, the most important economic activities. Later came hatmaking and tanning. In 1901, the Waldkrankenhaus ("Forest Hospital"), which still stands today (as the Fachklinik für Psychiatrie und Psychotherapie, or Specialized Clinic for Psychiatry and Psychotherapy) was founded by Dr. Emil Sioli from Frankfurt.

Köppern has a street hockey team, trained by, among others, professional hockey player Ingo Schwarz, who plays for Rote Teufel Bad Nauheim.

=== Burgholzhausen ===
In 1221, Burgholzhausen was being mentioned as Holzhausen in documents. The most important economic activity next to farming and linen weaving was said to be tilemaking, whose raw materials were dug from nearby clay pits. In the late 17th century, through the Ingelheimer family's lordly leadership, fruit growing was brought to Burgholzhausen

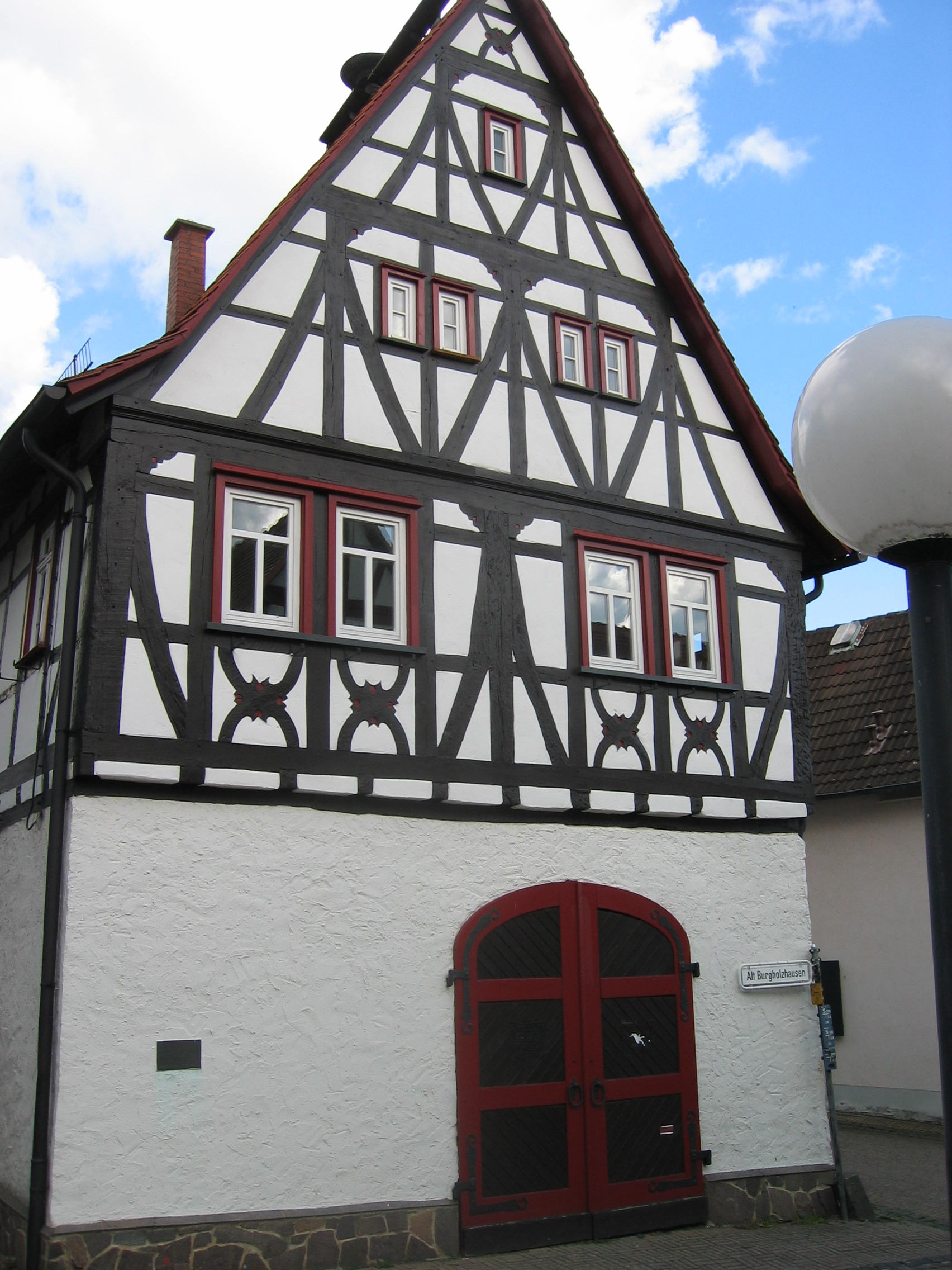
Old Town Hall (gable side)

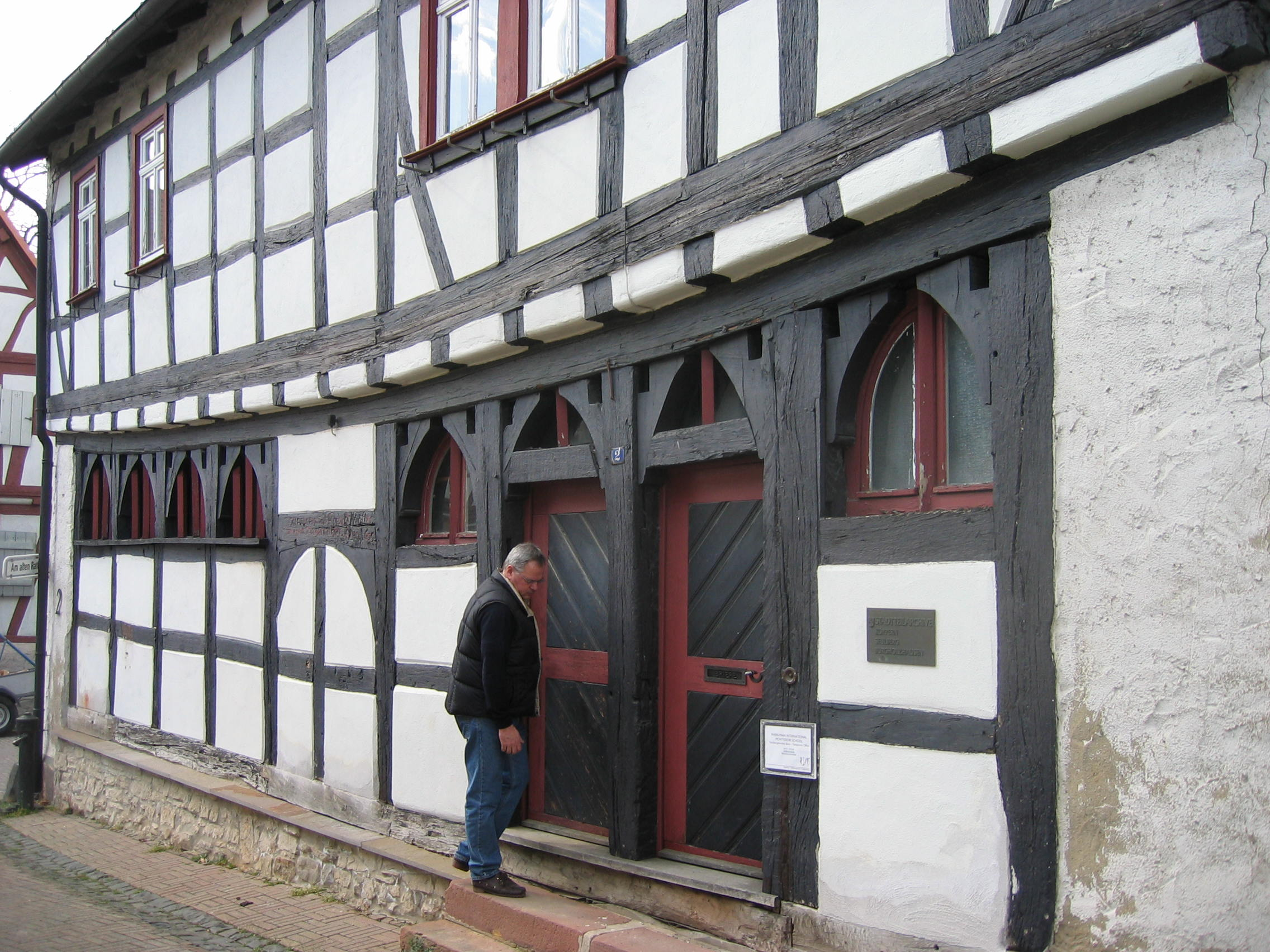
Burgholzhausen's Old Town Hall (1605)

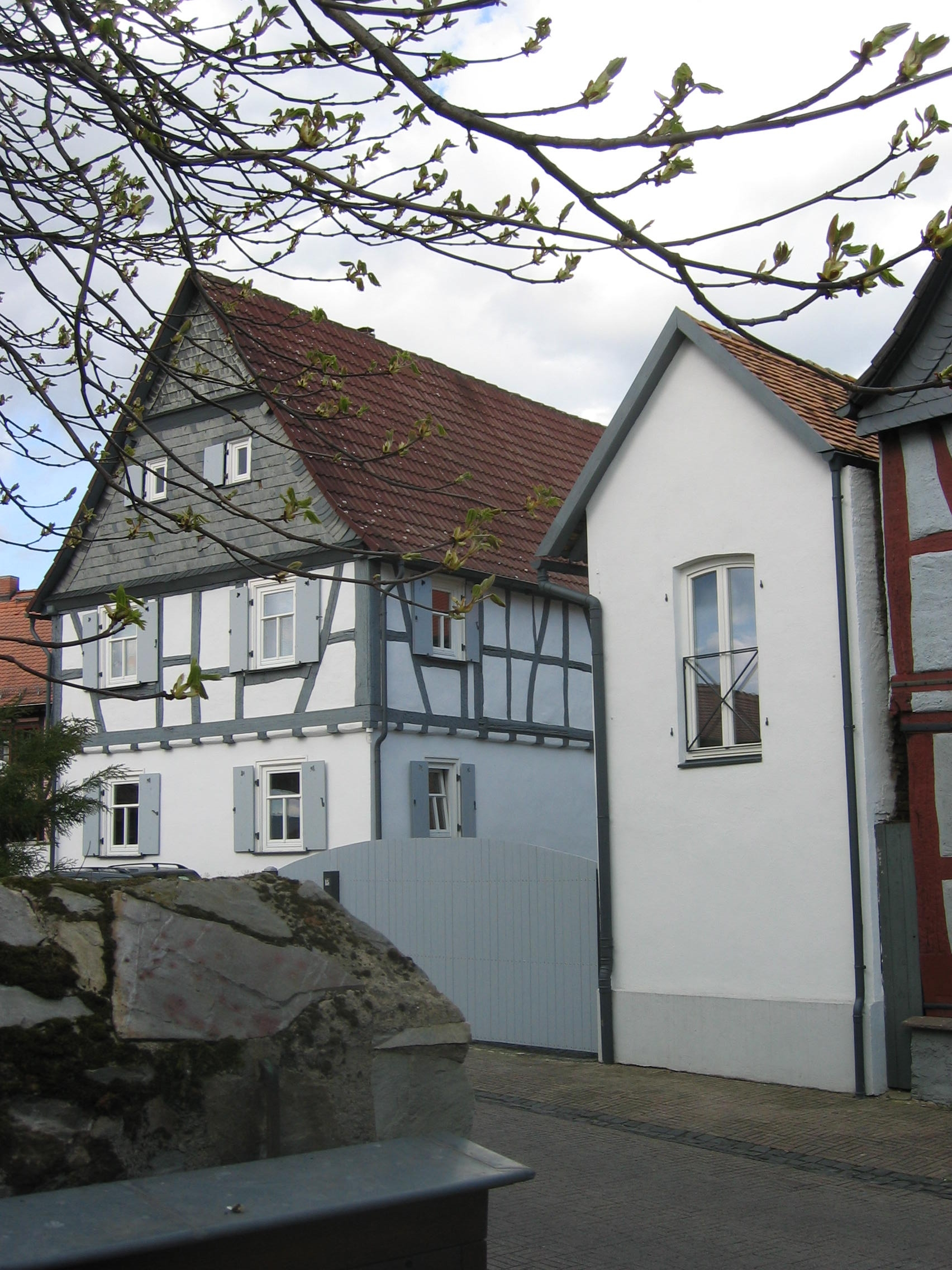
Renovated building from 1630 (downtown)

=== Seulberg ===
Seulberg was first mentioned in the Lorsch codex in 767. It is said to be one of the oldest settled places in the Hochtaunuskreis. Besides farming and linen weaving, pottery has long been an important activity here. With the Huguenots in Friedrichsdorf there was brisk trade. In a somewhat less cheerful chapter in Seulberg's history, there were witch trials in the 17th century which resulted in 31 women being put to death.

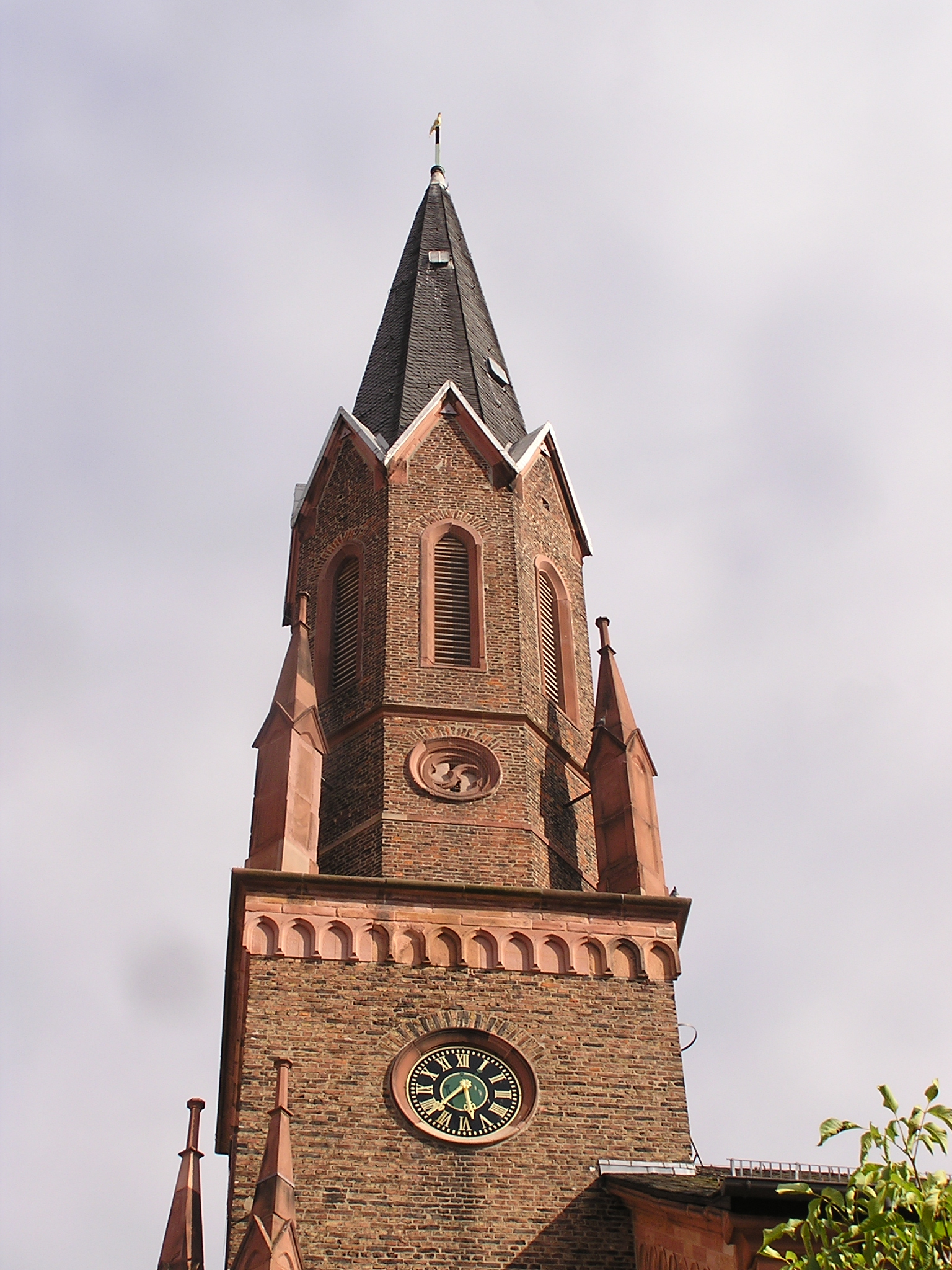
Evangelical-Lutheran Church (1862) (web page)

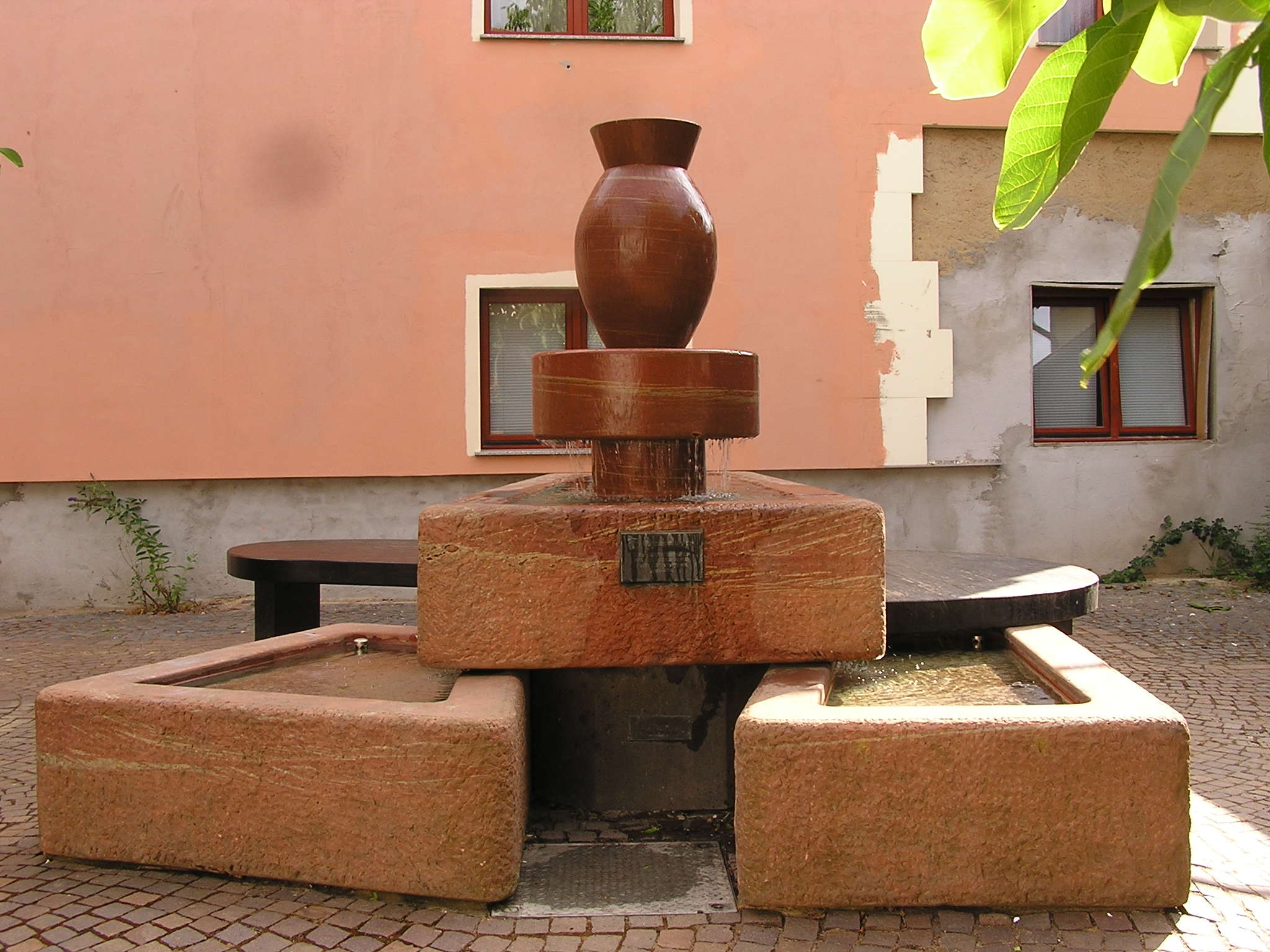
Töpferbrunnen ("Potters' Fountain")

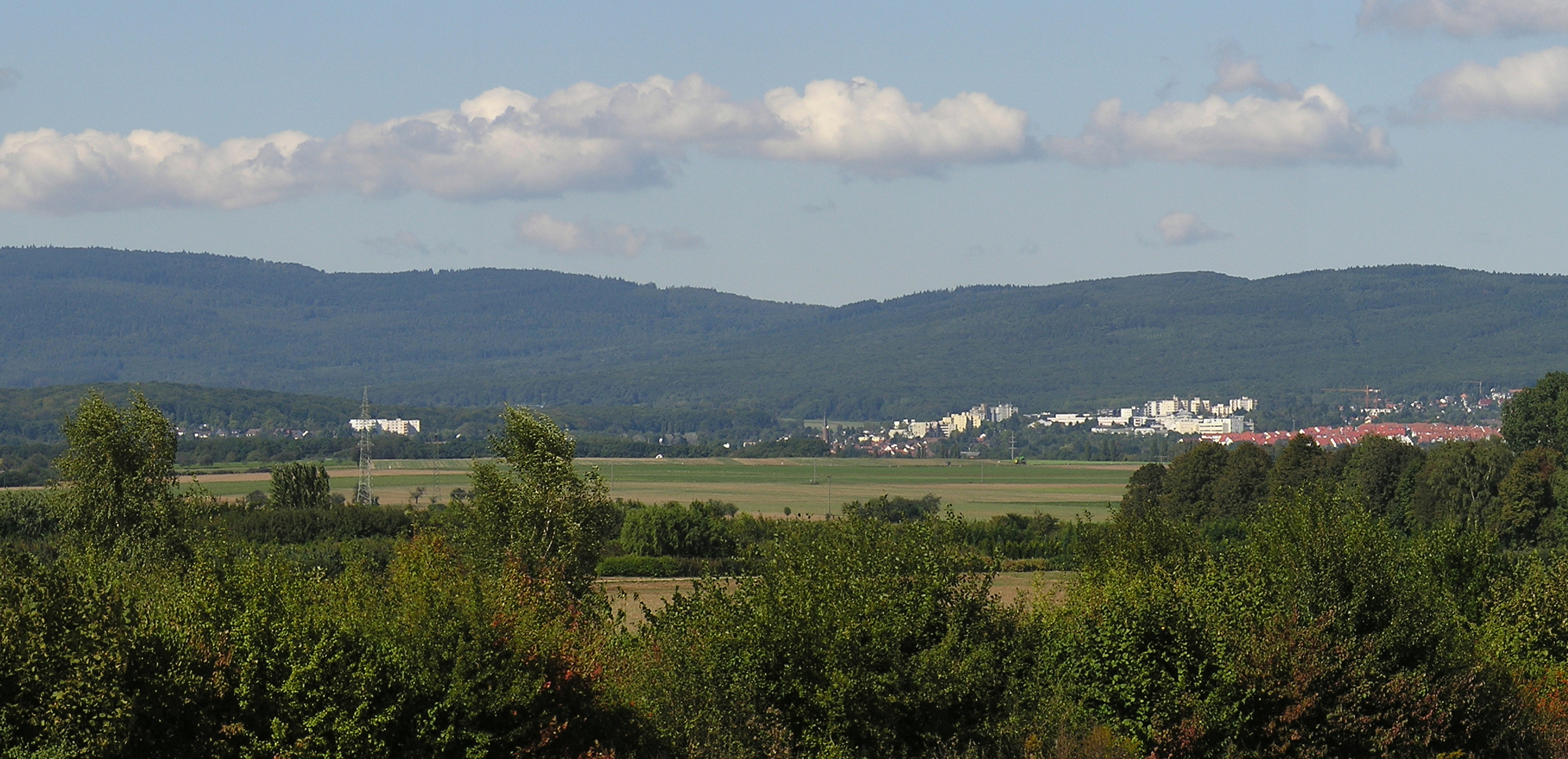
Seulberg as a whole

=== Coat of arms ===
Friedrichsdorf's old arms

Friedrichsdorf was given its first civic coat of arms in 1821 in remembrance of Russian Princess Alexandra's – and her eight guests' – visit to Count Friedrich in Bad Homburg: In azure a ring of nine roses argent (i.e. a blue shield with a ring of nine silver roses).

After amalgamation, a new coat of arms was created in 1975, taking the newly amalgamated parts of town into account. It might heraldically be described thus: Party per saltire, above, in azure a rose argent, dexter in argent a four-spoked wheel gules, sinister in argent a horseshoe gules, below, in gules a tower Or. The silver rose charge has been kept, although now there is only one instead of a ring of nine. The red stylized wheel stands for Köppern and the red horseshoe for Seulberg. The tower comes from Burgholzhausen's old arms.

== Economy and infrastructure ==
=== Transport ===
==== Roads ====
Through Friedrichsdorf's outlying rural areas runs Autobahn A5, an important traffic artery that also has an interchange at the northern edge of the municipal area (16, Friedberg / Friedrichsdorf). Furthermore, Federal Highway (Bundesstraße) B 455 also runs through the town.

==== Railway stations ====
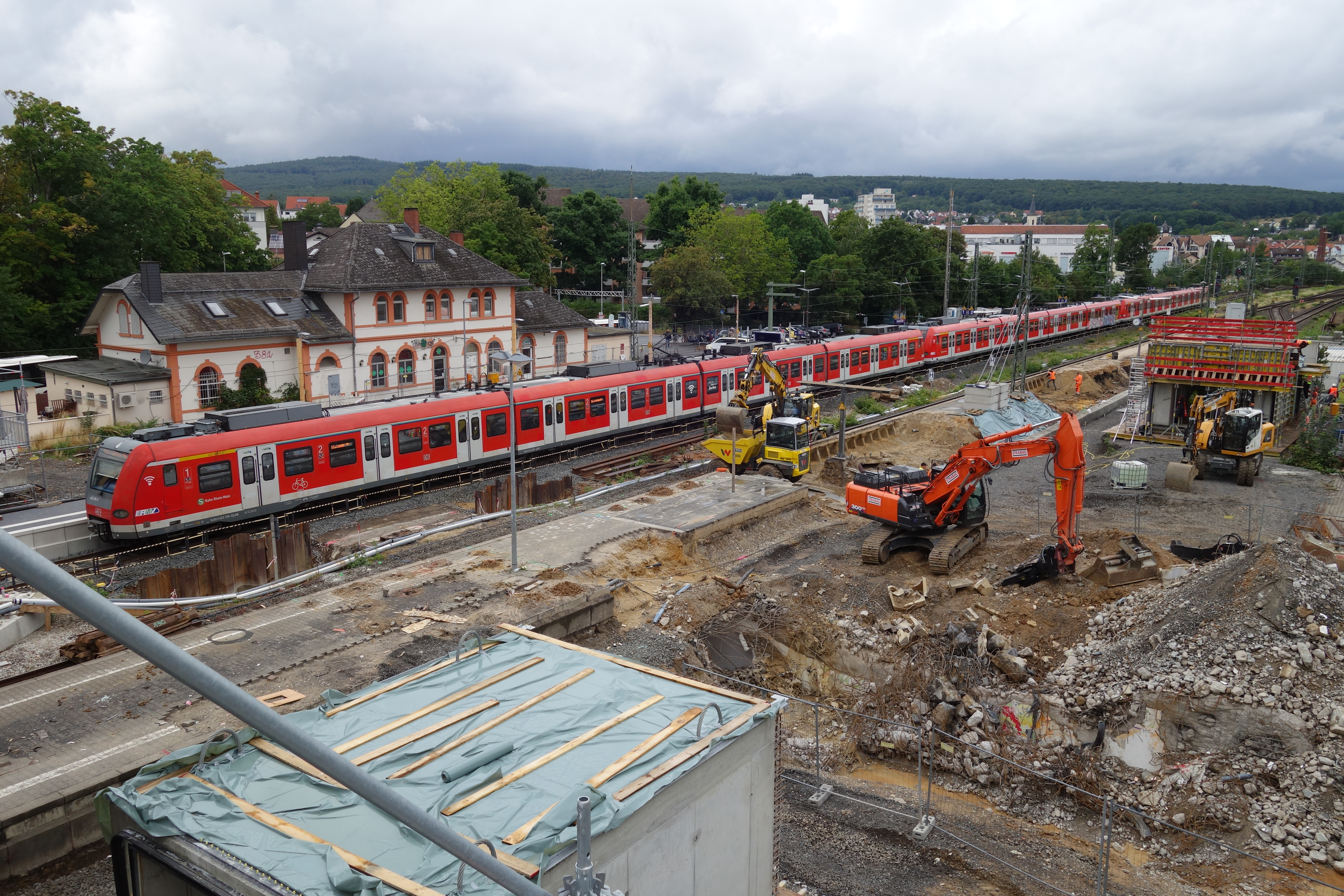
Railway station Friedrichsdorf during modernization 2023 with S-Bahn

There are four railway stations, one in every constituent community apart from Dillingen. Friedrichsdorf station is the end of Rhine-Main S-Bahn line S 5 which runs along the Homburg Railway line. Further lines here are Taunusbahn to Waldsolms-Brandoberndorf and Friedberg–Friedrichsdorf railway to Friedberg.

==== Air Traffic ====
The Rotorflug company provides helicopter transport.

Frankfurt International Airport can be reached via train in 50 Minutes or by road (30 km).

=== Population ===
(in each case on 31 December)

Year	Inhabitants
1998	24,404
1999	24,128
2000	24,282
2001	24,406
2002	24,572
2003	24,497
2004	24,605
2006 (June 30)	24,522
2007	24,330
2010	24,875

== Politics ==
=== Town council elections ===
Parties and Voters Associations		% 2016	Seats 2016	% 2011	Seats 2011	% 2006	Seats 2006	% 2001	Seats 2001
CDU	Christian Democratic Union	23.9	9	31.7	12	37.1	14	34.1	13
SPD	Social Democratic Party	13.4	5	18.4	7	19.9	7	26.4	10
GREENS	Alliance '90/The Greens	21.9	8	25.5	9	15.9	6	14.5	5
FDP	Free Democratic Party	11.6	4	7.0	3	8.6	3	6.3	2
FWG	Free Voters Association	25.7	10	17.4	6	15.5	6	8.5	3
REP	The Republicans	-	-	-	-	1.9	1	2.3	1
LLF	Left List for Friedrichsdorf	3.4	1	—	—	1.1	0	—	—
UWG	Independent Voters Association	—	—	—	—	—	—	8.0	3
Total		100,0	37	100,0	37	100,0	37	100,0	37
Turnout of voters in %		50.5		49.5		46.9		56.3	

=== Mayor ===
- Horst Burghardt (Green) is mayor of Friedrichsdorf since 1997. In March 2021, Lars Keitel (Green) was elected as his successor.

== Twin towns – sister cities ==
Friedrichsdorf is twinned with:

- Bad Wimsbach-Neydharting, Austria (1968)
- Houilles, France (1973)
- Chesham, England, United Kingdom (1980)

== Schools ==
- Philipp-Reis-Schule
- King's College The British School of Frankfurt

== Notable people ==
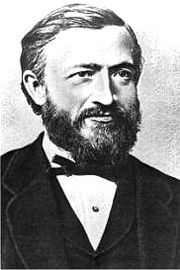
Johann Philipp Reis

- François Blanc (1806–1877), French entrepreneur and operator of casinos
- Abraham Louis Wallon (1807–1889), Methodist preacher in Germany and the United States
- Pierre Jean Édouard Desor (1811–1882), German-Swiss geologist and naturalist
- Paul Cérésole (1832–1905), Swiss politician and judge of the Supreme Court (1867–1870)
- Johann Philipp Reis (1834–1874), teacher and inventor of the Reis telephone
- Karl Willy Wagner (1883–1953), pioneer in the theory of electronic filters
- Martin Schneider (born 1964), comedian, cabarettist and actor
- Rob Pilatus (1965–1998), model, dancer and singer
- Alexander Mattschull (born 1972), racing driver

== Religion ==
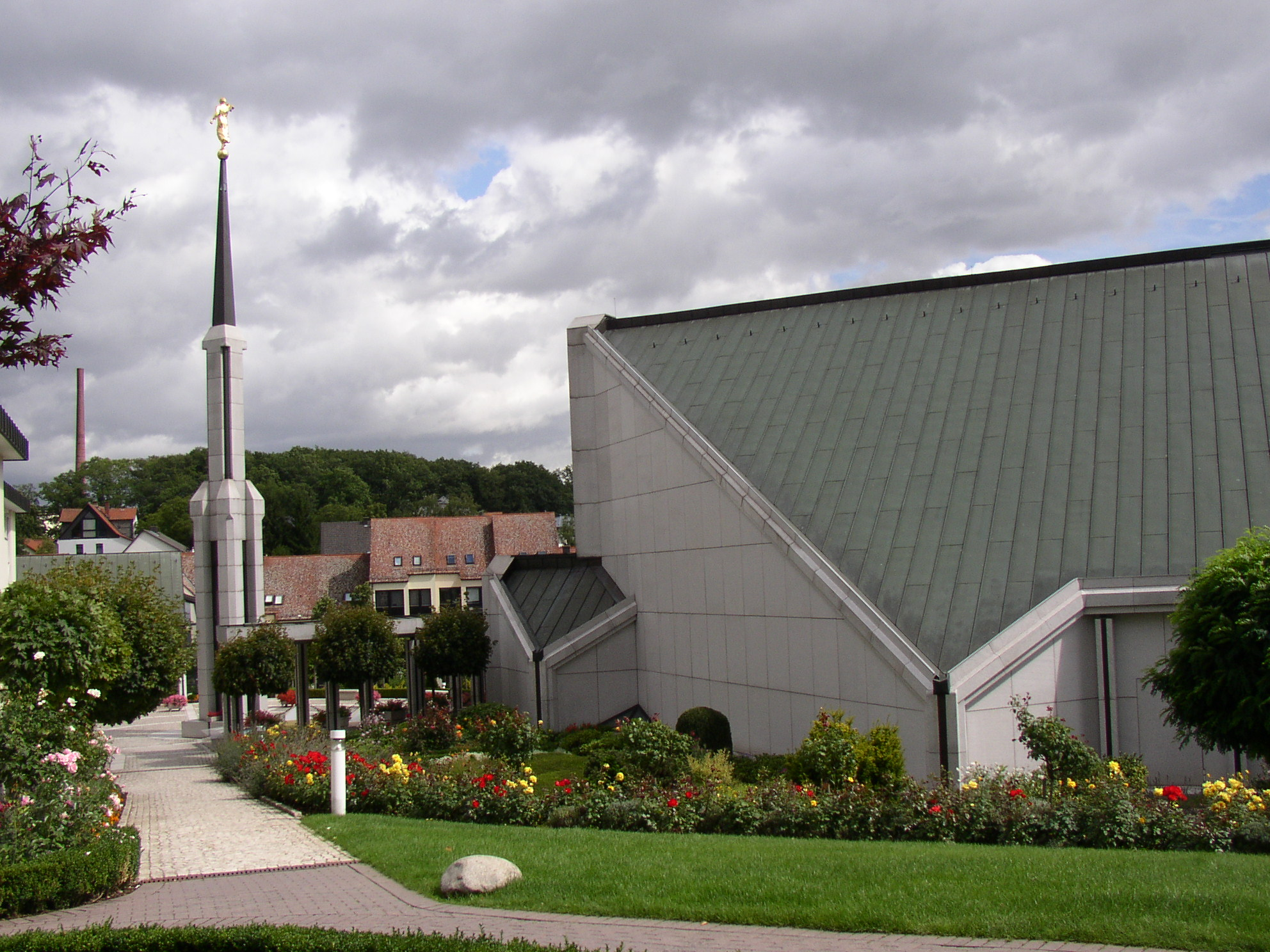
Frankfurt Temple

In Friedrichsdorf stands one of the two Temples of the Church of Jesus Christ of Latter-day Saints in Germany, called the Frankfurt Germany Temple (the other one is in Freiberg, Saxony). The Temple was dedicated for operation in 1987 by then President of the Church of Jesus Christ of Latter-day Saints, Ezra Taft Benson.
