= Friedberg Süd station =

Railway station in Hesse, Germany

Friedberg Süd

General information
- Location: Frankfurter Straße 40; 61169 Friedberg, Hesse; Germany
- Coordinates: 50.3203°N 8.7476°E
- Owner: DB Netz
- Operator: DB Station&Service
- Line: Friedberg–Friedrichsdorf railway
- Platforms: 1 side platform
- Tracks: 1
- Train operators: DB Regio Mitte

Construction
- Accessible: Yes

Other information
- Station code: 1870
- DS100 code: FGS
- IBNR: 8002105
- Category: 7
- Fare zone: : 2501
- Website: www.bahnhof.de

Services
Preceding station	DB Regio Mitte	Following station
Friedberg (Hess) towards Friedberg	RB 16	Rosbach vor der Höhe towards Friedrichsdorf or Bad Homburg
Location
- Location within Hesse

Friedberg Süd station is a railway station in the southern part of Friedberg, located in the Wetteraukreis district in Hesse, Germany.
