= Rosbach (Nidda) =

River in Germany

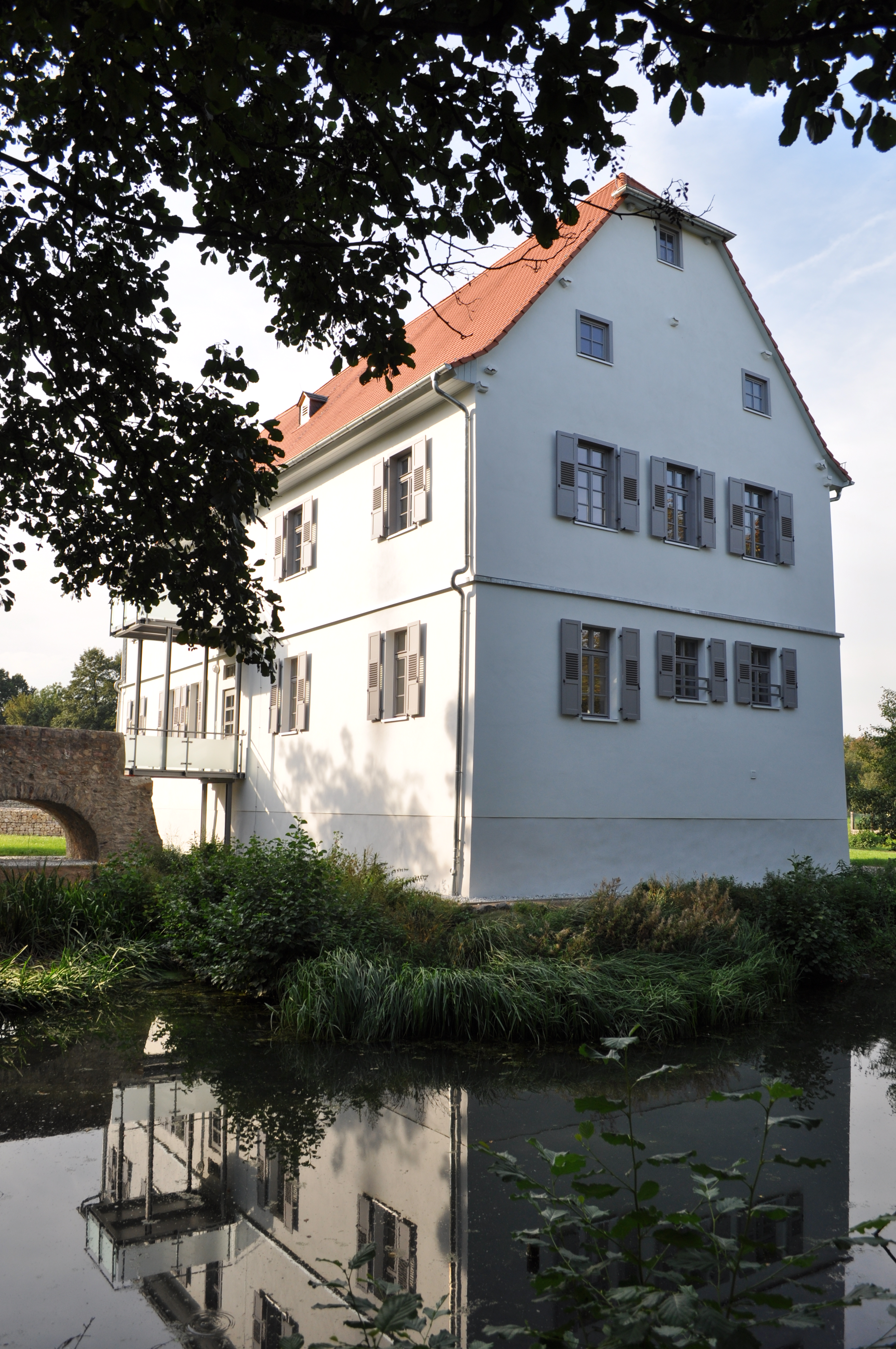
- The Rosbach river feeds the ditch of the Wasserburg located in Nieder-Rosbach

Location
- Country: Germany
- State: Hesse

Physical characteristics
- Source
  - location: Taunus
  - coordinates: 50°18′17″N 8°41′12″E
- Mouth
  - location: Nidda
  - coordinates: 50°16′38″N 8°47′4″E
- Length: 9.0 km (5.6 mi)
- Basin size: 23.9 km^{2} (9.2 sq mi)
- Discharge
  - average: 0.128 m^{3}/s (4.5 cu ft/s)

Basin features
- Progression: Nidda→ Main→ Rhine→ North Sea

Rosbach (German pronunciation: [ˈʁoːsbax]) is a river in Hesse, Germany, with a length of 9 kilometres (5.6 mi). The river is a right tributary of the Nidda which itself is a right tributary of the Main river in Hesse. The river Rosbach gives the town Rosbach vor der Höhe its name.

== Geography ==
It is rising at the Northern side of the town Rosbach vor der Höhe located at the edge of the Taunus mountain range. The town itself was named after this river. Nowadays, the actual location of the spring cannot be determined due to the growing development of the village Ober-Rosbach, part of Rosbach vor der Höhe. A small pond inside of a leisure facility supplies the river, from there it is led to the Eastern side of Ober-Rosbach by pipes and, when reaching the Bundesstraße 455, it leaves the pipe system.

At this point, the rivers' tributary Fahrenbach is connecting. This river springs in the impact crater-like valley near the mountain Steinkopf. It transports more water and is longer than the Rosbach river, but the latter kept its name. On raining days the water is cloudy, as the source of the Fahrenbach is located at a former quartzite quarry.

On reaching Nieder-Rosbach the river Rosbach feeds the Wasserburg followed by several small ponds inhabited by duck populations which contribute to the poor water quality. The river then flows through a sewage treatment and in a deepening of the Wetterau it flows towards Ober-Wöllstadt. From now on, the river is called Gänsbach, passes a small forest, and flows to Nieder-Wöllstadt. There, the right tributary Lachengraben is joining and Rosbach enters the Nidda as Aubach.

== See also ==
- List of rivers of Hesse
