= Rosbach vor der Höhe =

- Town
- Coat of arms

- Location of Rosbach vor der Höhe within Wetteraukreis district
- Interactive map of Rosbach vor der Höhe
- Location within Germany Location within Hesse
- Coordinates: 50°17′55″N 8°42′2″E
- Country: Germany
- State: Hesse
- Admin. region: Darmstadt
- District: Wetteraukreis
- Subdivisions: 3 districts

Government
  - Mayor (2019–2031): Steffen Maar (Ind.)

Area
  - Total: 45.33 km^{2} (17.50 sq mi)
- Elevation: 178 m (584 ft)

Population (2025-12-31)
  - Total: 13,034
  - Density: 287.5/km^{2} (744.7/sq mi)
- Time zone: UTC+01:00 (CET)
  - Summer (DST): UTC+02:00 (CEST)
- Postal codes: 61191
- Dialling codes: 06003 (Ober-/Nieder-Rosbach), 06007 (Rodheim)
- Vehicle registration: FB
- Website: www.rosbach-hessen.de

Rosbach vor der Höhe (German pronunciation: [ˈʁoːsbax foːɐ̯ deːɐ̯ ˈhøːə], lit. 'Rosbach before the Height') is a town in the Wetteraukreis district of Hesse, Germany. It is located 25 km north of Frankfurt, on the eastern edge of the Taunus mountain range. The town has a population of approximately 12,000.

== History ==
Archaeological finds in the area date back to the Linear Pottery culture and the Celtic period. The earliest surviving mention of "Rosbach" dates from 884; the originally independent district of Rodheim was documented as early as 805 in the Lorsch codex.

The origin of the name Rosbach is not entirely settled. The town was named after the nearby stream (German: Bach) of the same name. The most accepted explanation derives it from the Middle High German roezen or rozen (German: rösten; to ret). The most common craft in Rosbach was the weaving of linen, and retting describes the process of separating fibre from stem during linen production.

In 884, Ober-Rosbach was granted to Fulda Abbey as an imperial gift by Emperor Charles the Fat. The settlement later passed to the Landgraviate of Hesse-Darmstadt, the County of Nassau, and the Electorate and Archbishopric of Trier. In 1663, Rosbach received town privileges. The district of Rodheim was the seat of the Amt Rodheim from about 1600 to 1821.

Rosbach lay on the historic trade road Along the Long Hesse (German: Durch die langen Hessen) connecting Frankfurt and Leipzig. Between 1850 and 1926, manganese ore was mined in 80 workings across the area. During this time the natural resource brought technological progress and the population increased sharply. In 1901, Nieder-Rosbach and Rodheim were connected to the German rail network by the Friedberg–Friedrichsdorf railway. In 1912, the previously shared cadastral district was divided into Nieder-Rosbach and Ober-Rosbach.

A 1988 arson attack in Rosbach, carried out by sympathisers of the French group Action Directe, received nationwide press coverage.

=== Municipal mergers ===
As part of the territorial reform in Hesse, the previously independent municipality of Nieder-Rosbach was incorporated into the town of Ober-Rosbach on 1 December 1970, and Ober-Rosbach was officially renamed Rosbach. On 1 August 1972, this short-lived town was merged with Rodheim vor der Höhe by state law to form a new town of Rosbach. On 14 March 1973, the town received its current name, Rosbach vor der Höhe.

== Geography ==
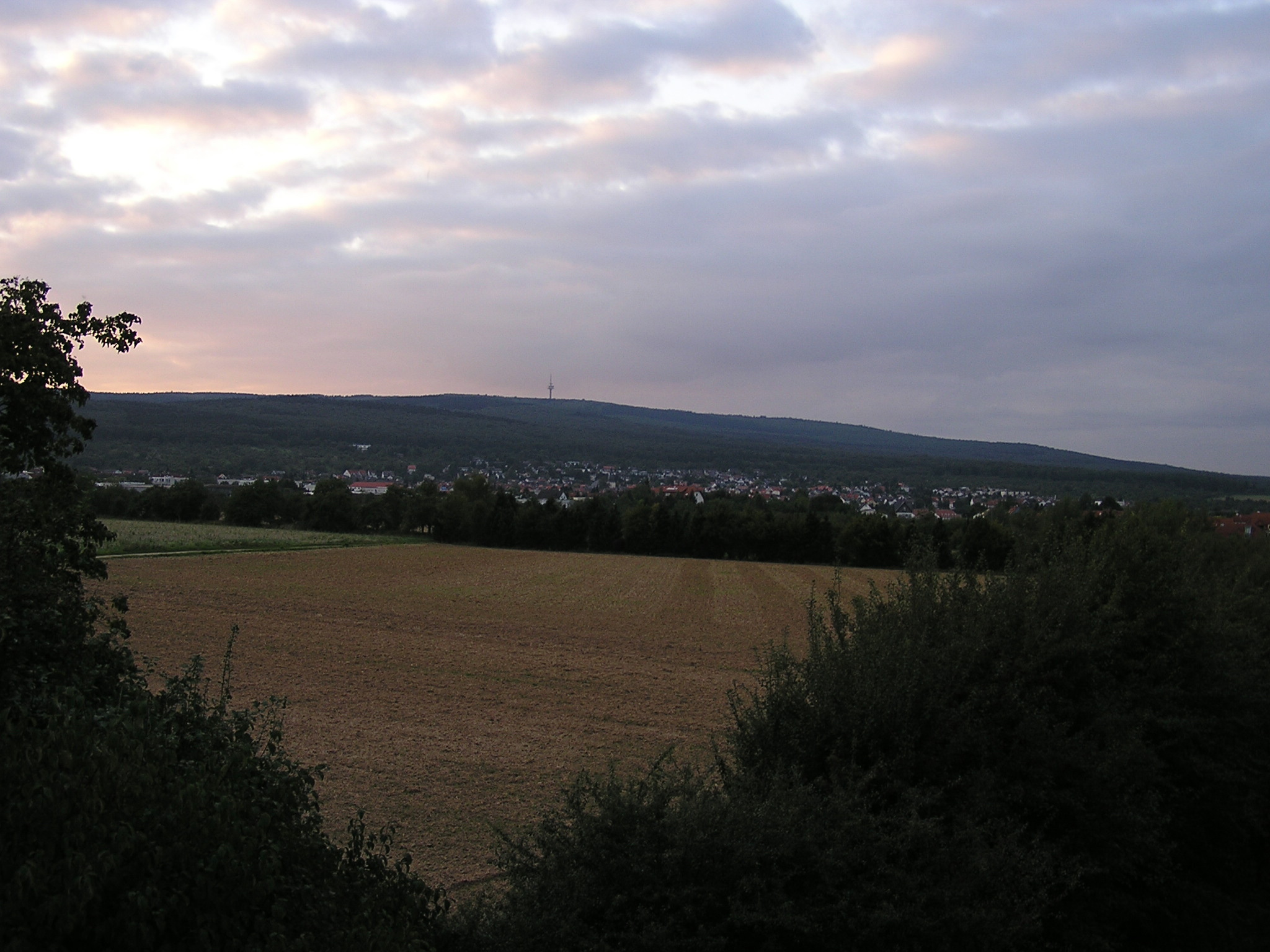
Ober-Rosbach at the Winterstein

=== Location ===
To the north, Rosbach borders Friedberg; to the east, Wöllstadt; to the south, Karben (all in the Wetteraukreis); and to the west, Bad Homburg, Friedrichsdorf and Wehrheim (all in the Hochtaunuskreis). The streams Fahrenbach and Rosbach in Ober-Rosbach and Nieder-Rosbach, respectively, flow into the Nidda.

=== Geology ===
Between 1998 and 2000, a ring structure near Rosbach, dubbed the Rosbach Krater, was discussed as a possible impact crater. Starting with an article in the local newspaper Wetterauer Zeitung, articles in the Frankfurter Rundschau and the Frankfurter Allgemeine Zeitung followed. A mineralogist and his team from the University of Marburg found planar structures in quartz that they initially interpreted as evidence of a meteorite impact. Two weeks later they revised their assessment, identifying the features as Boehm lamellae instead. The deformed lamellae are now thought to have formed during the uplift of the Taunus range rather than from an impact event.

=== Subdivisions ===
Rosbach vor der Höhe consists of three districts: Ober-Rosbach (Upper Rosbach), Nieder-Rosbach (Lower Rosbach) and Rodheim.

District	Inhabitants (2022)
Ober-Rosbach	6,070
Rodheim	5,080
Nieder-Rosbach	2,422
Total	13,572

== Politics ==
=== Town council ===
The municipal election of 15 March 2026 produced the following results for the town council (Stadtverordnetenversammlung), shown alongside earlier elections:

Party		% 2026	Seats 2026	% 2021	Seats 2021	% 2016	Seats 2016	% 2011	Seats 2011	% 2006	Seats 2006	% 2001	Seats 2001
CDU	Christian Democratic Union	27.7	9	28.0	9	26.1	8	29.1	9	34.8	11	40.6	15
Stimme	Stimme Rosbach/Rodheim	22.2	7	17.0	5	12.2	4	—	—	—	—	—	—
Greens	Alliance 90/The Greens	16.9	5	17.0	5	8.3	2	13.6	4	6.7	2	—	—
FWG	Free Voters Union	14.3	4	14.6	5	15.2	5	13.6	4	16.7	5	15.8	6
SPD	Social Democratic Party	11.8	4	13.7	4	22.4	7	24.5	8	23.0	7	29.8	11
FDP	Free Democratic Party	7.0	2	8.6	3	11.6	4	5.6	2	6.7	2	5.2	2
SALZ	Soziale Alternative Lebenswerte Zukunft	—	—	1.1	0	4.2	1	—	—	—	—	—	—
puR	parteiunabhängige Rosbacher	—	—	—	—	—	—	10.2	3	7.7	3	8.7	3
Pirates	Pirate Party	—	—	—	—	—	—	3.4	1	—	—	—	—
Die Linke	Die Linke	—	—	—	—	—	—	—	—	4.4	1	—	—
Total		100.0	31	100.0	31	100.0	31	100.0	31	100.0	31	100.0	37
Voter turnout		54.0%		52.6%		50.8%		46.9%		45.8%		53.3%	

=== Mayor ===
Under the Hessian municipal constitution, the mayor (Bürgermeister) is directly elected for a six-year term and chairs the town's executive board (Magistrat), which in Rosbach comprises the mayor, a First Town Councillor (Erster Stadtrat) and six further town councillors, all serving in an honorary capacity.

The current mayor is the independent Steffen Maar, who took office on 17 March 2019 after winning a run-off election on 11 November 2018 with 54.3% of the vote on a turnout of 54.8%. He was re-elected unopposed in September 2024.

Recent mayors:

- 2019–present: Steffen Maar (independent)
- 2013–2019: Thomas Alber
- 1997–2013: Detlef Brechtel
- 1991–1996: Reinhold Medebach (SPD)
- 1979–1990: Detlef Brechtel

=== Arms ===
Arms of Rosbach

Blazon: Or, a chevron gules, accompanied in chief dexter by a tower azure, in chief sinister by a shepherd's shovel azure, and in base by a rose gules seeded or barbed vert.

The shepherd's shovel represents the formerly independent Nieder-Rosbach; the tower stands for Rodheim vor der Höhe, which was incorporated in 1972; and the rose, the traditional emblem of Ober-Rosbach, represents Rosbach as a whole.

=== Twin towns ===
Rosbach is twinned with:

- Netzschkau, Saxony, Germany (since 1990)
- Ciechanowiec, Poland (since 1995)
- Saint-Germain-lès-Corbeil, Essonne, France (since 1995)

== Economy and infrastructure ==
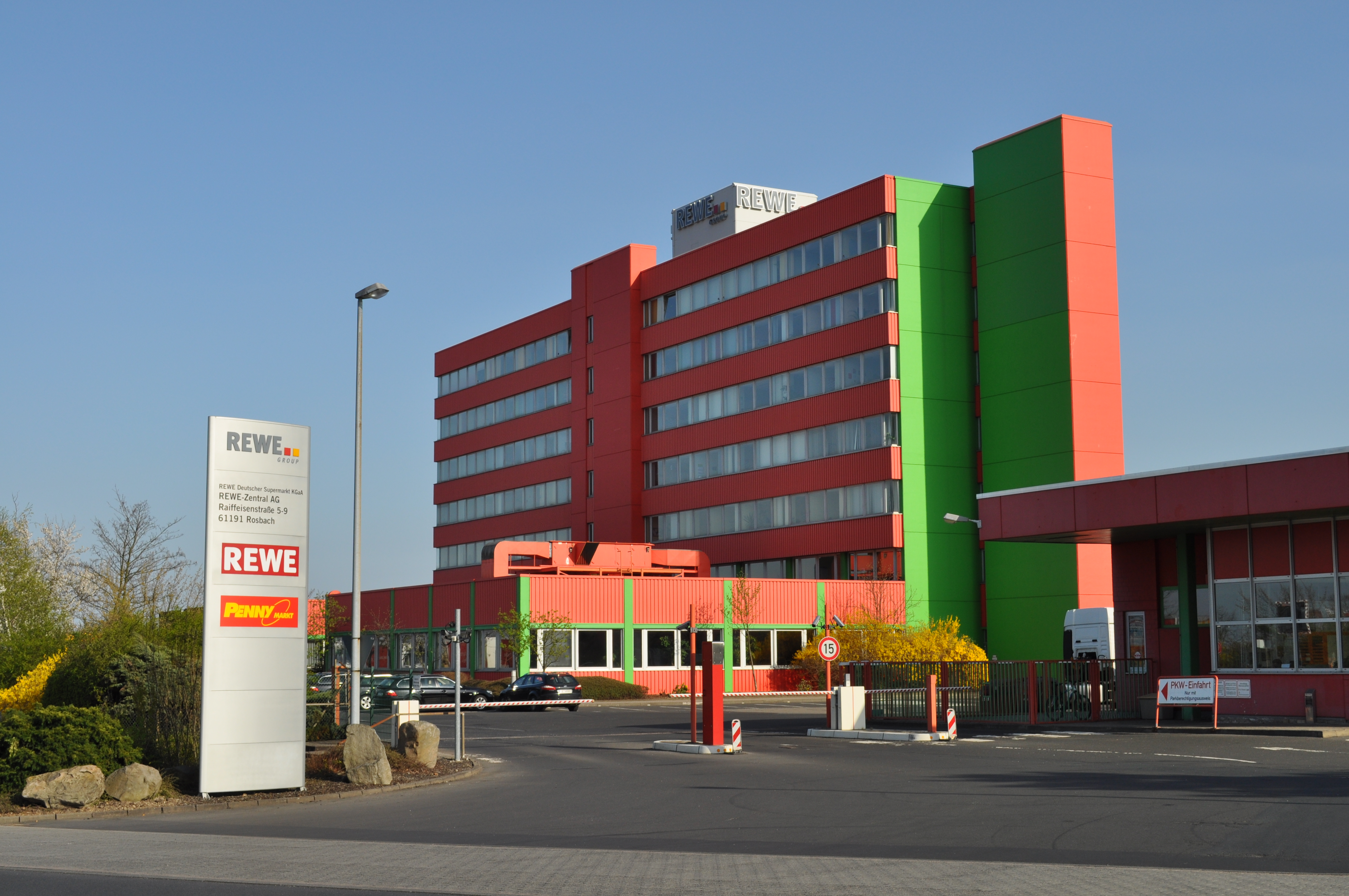
REWE distribution centre in Nieder-Rosbach

=== Transport ===
Rosbach has a rail connection on the Friedberg–Friedrichsdorf railway, which is scheduled for electrification by 2029. The station, opened in 1901, is heritage-listed and houses the town library.

The town is located near the Friedberg junction of the Bundesautobahn 5, which carries heavy commuter traffic between the western Wetteraukreis and Frankfurt. The Bundesstraße 455 runs between Ober-Rosbach and Nieder-Rosbach. Since late 2013, a bypass road (Kreisstraße 11) carries traffic south of Nieder-Rosbach between Ober-Wöllstadt and the motorway.

=== Local businesses ===
The Rosbacher mineral spring in Nieder-Rosbach has belonged to Hassia Mineralquellen since 2001; since 2009 the water has been piped from the spring to a bottling plant in Bad Vilbel. The industrial park in Ober-Rosbach, covering 0.44 km² near the A5 motorway access, is large relative to the town's 4.46 km² residential area. It houses:

- REWE Deutscher Supermarkt KGaA: distribution centre and administrative building
- Triumph Motorcycles: German headquarters (since 2009)
- Trigema GmbH & Co. KG

Quartzite quarries are found in the adjacent woodland.

=== Education ===
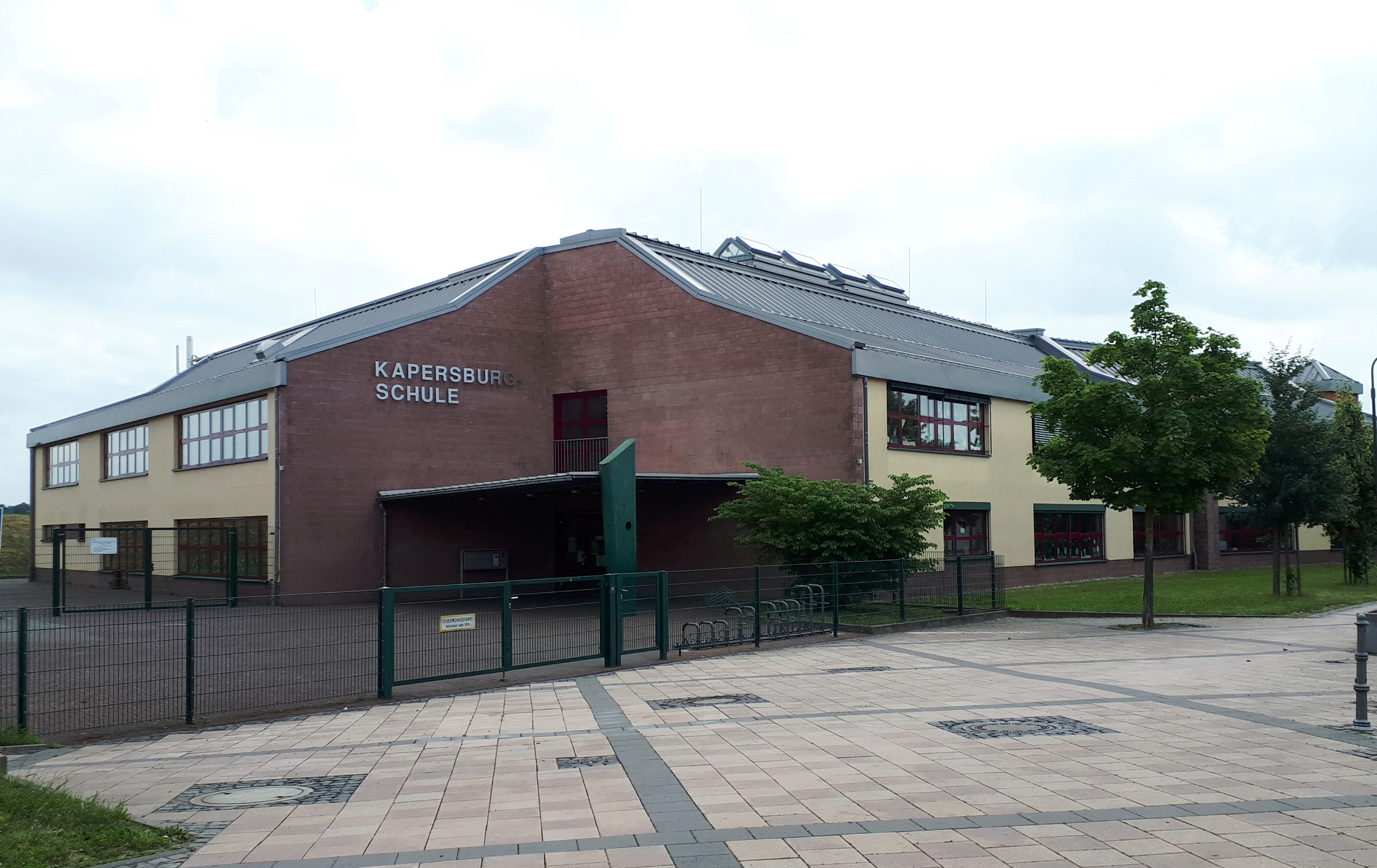
Kapersburgschule

- Kapersburgschule: primary school (Ober- and Nieder-Rosbach)
- Erich Kästner-Schule: primary, Hauptschule and Realschule (Rodheim)

The town also has several kindergartens across all three districts.

== Culture and sights ==
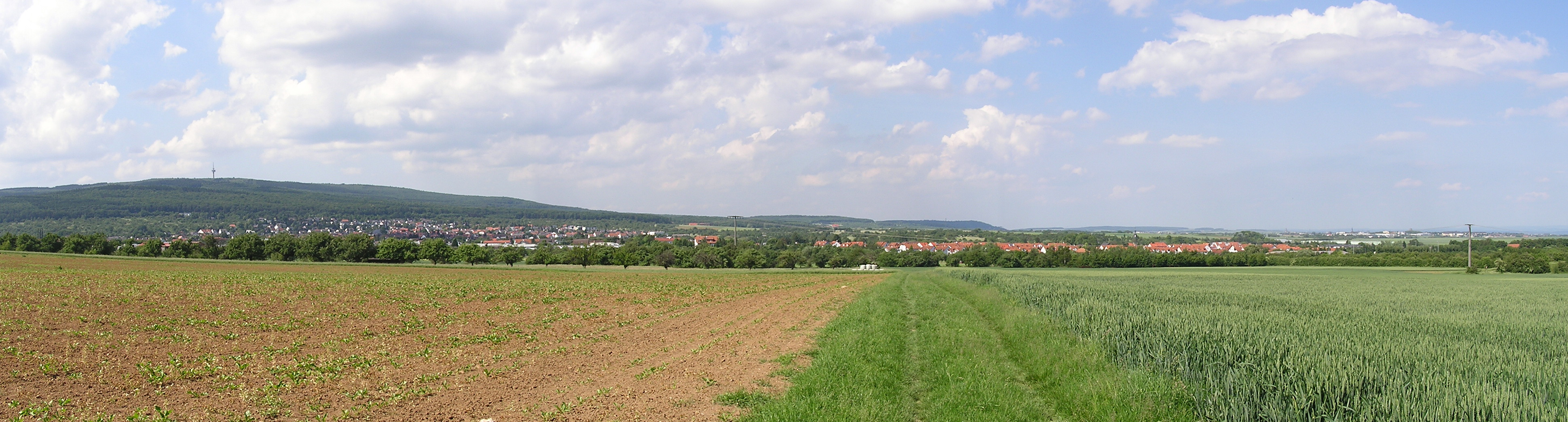
Panorama of Rosbach

=== Kapersburg ===
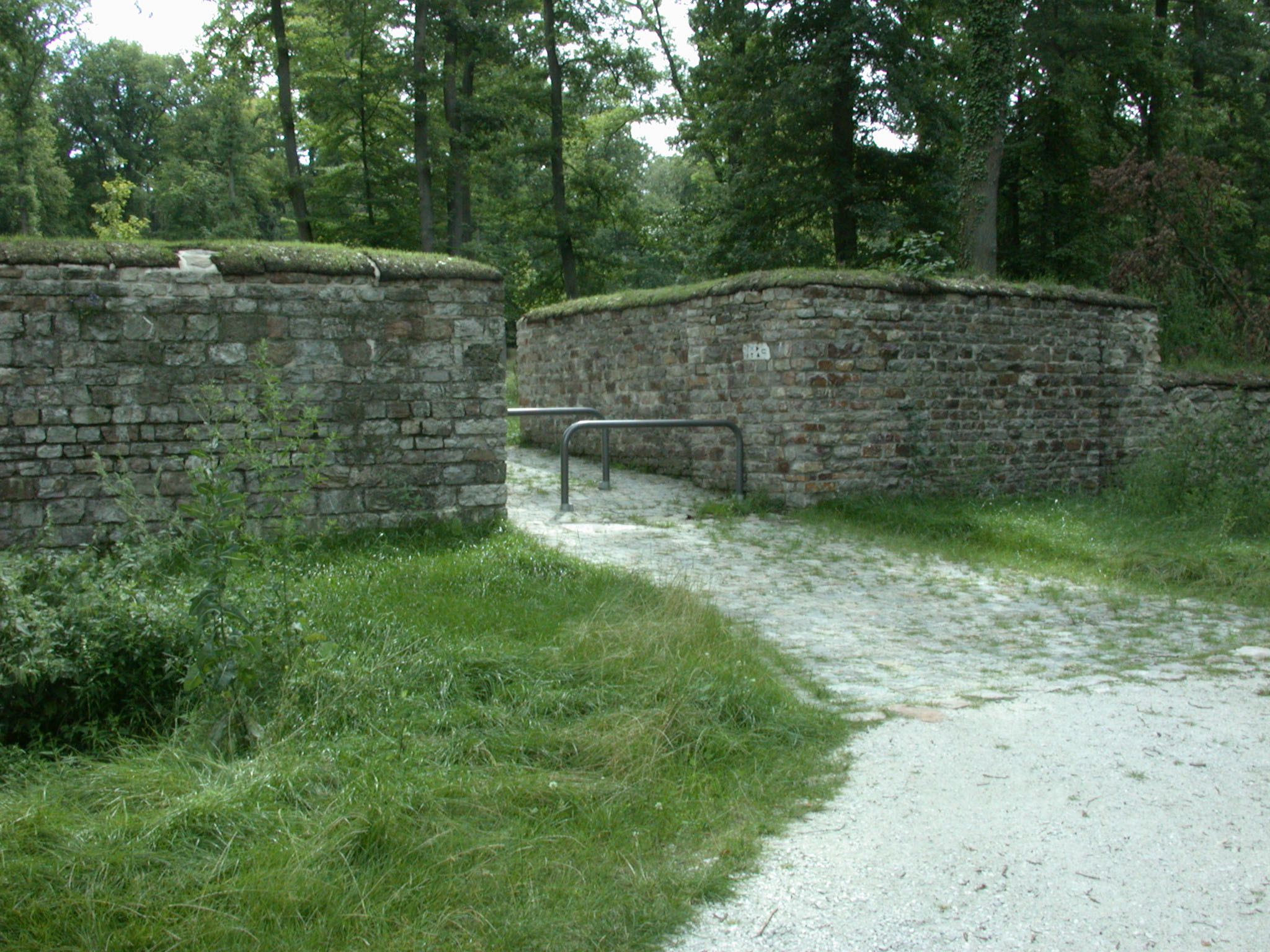
Western gate of the Kapersburg

The Kapersburg is located three kilometres west of Ober-Rosbach and is one of the best-preserved Roman forts on the Limes Germanicus in Germany. It was excavated around the turn of the 20th century. The fort was built presumably during the time of Emperor Trajan around 98 AD, or of Emperor Hadrian around 130 AD. The garrison withdrew in the third century, as did those of other forts along the limes; the fort was reduced in size and a wall built across its middle. Its abandonment appears to have been non-violent and is dated to around the middle of the third century.

In 2005, as part of the Upper Germanic-Raetian Limes, the fort's remains were inscribed on the UNESCO World Heritage Site list as part of the Frontiers of the Roman Empire. The fort was fully restored and an archaeological park built around it.

=== Wasserburg ===
A heritage-listed moated castle (Wasserburg) stands in Nieder-Rosbach. It may originally have been built as a motte serving as an insignia of the ministerialis. The castle is owned by the town and used as an events venue and community meeting place.

=== Other sights ===
The Wehrturm is a medieval fortified tower in the old centre of Ober-Rosbach, now housing the municipal archive of the Heimatgeschichtsverein 1984 Rosbach v. d. Höhe e.V. (Association for Local History Rosbach). The Faselstall, a former stable with a tavern behind the old town hall of Rodheim, serves a similar function for the Rodheimer Geschichts- und Heimatverein e.V. (Association for Local History Rodheim).

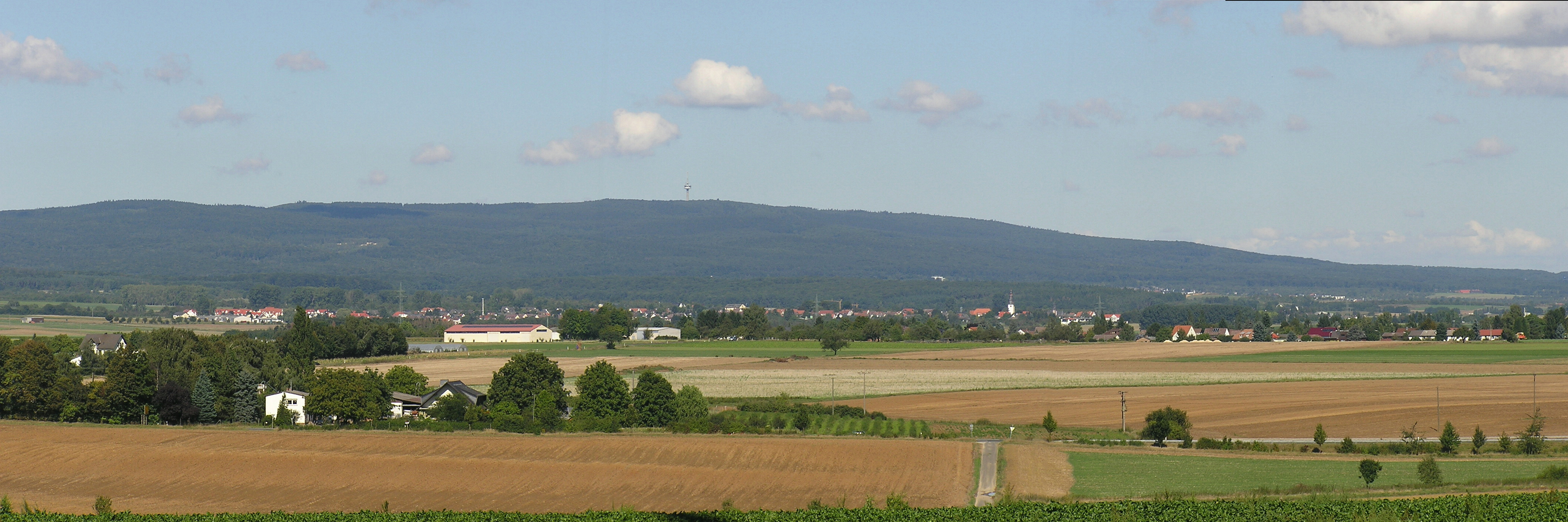
Steinkopf

The highest point on the eastern Taunus edge is the Steinkopf at 518 m, lying between Ober-Rosbach and Pfaffenwiesbach (part of Wehrheim).

=== Churches ===
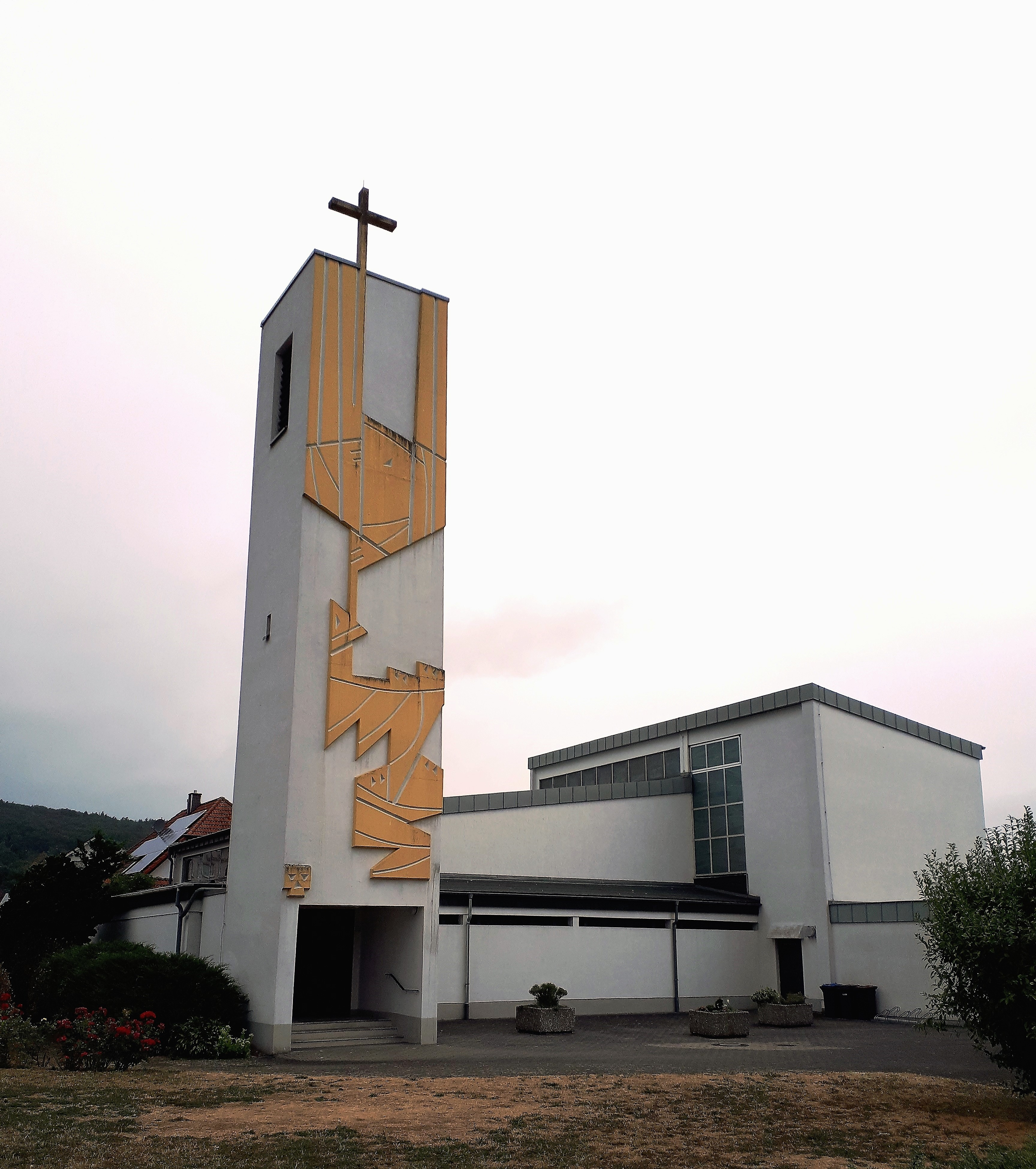
Catholic church of St. Michael

Protestant churches in the town include the Stadtkirche in Ober-Rosbach, the Burgkirche in Nieder-Rosbach, and the Evangelische Kirche in Rodheim. The two Catholic parishes are St. Michael (serving Ober- and Nieder-Rosbach) and St. Johannes Evangelist in Rodheim.

=== Regular events ===
Annual events in Rosbach include the Blütenfest (blossom festival), Altstadtfest (old town festival), Schwimmbadfest (swimming pool festival), Burgfest (castle festival), and "Rosbach goes Gospel".

== Notable people ==
- Margarete Elisabeth von Leiningen-Westerburg (1604–1667), Countess of Leiningen and regent of Hesse-Homburg
- Wilhelm Christoph von Hessen-Homburg (1625–1681), Landgrave of Hesse-Homburg, born in Ober-Rosbach
- Johann Ludwig Christ (1739–1813), naturalist, gardener and pastor, worked in Rodheim from 1776 to 1786
- Ernst Friedrich Felix Rumpf (1764–1849), pharmacist, chemist and university teacher, born in Ober-Rosbach
- Adolf Reichwein (1898–1944), educator, economist and SPD politician, executed for his role in the resistance against Nazism, grew up in Ober-Rosbach
- Helmut Neubauer (1925–2001), historian of Eastern Europe, born in Rodheim
- Volkert Kraeft (born 1941), actor, lives in Rosbach
- Frank Farian (1941–2024), record producer and singer-songwriter, maintained a recording studio in Ober-Rosbach
- Maja Nielsen (born 1964), author, lives in Rosbach
- Jessica Wahls (born 1977), singer, television host and member of No Angels, grew up in Rodheim
- Till Helmke (born 1984), sprinter and sports official, grew up in Rosbach
