= Rosbach vor der Höhe station =

Railway station in Rosbach vor der Höhe, Germany

Rosbach vor der Höhe Rosbach v d Höhe
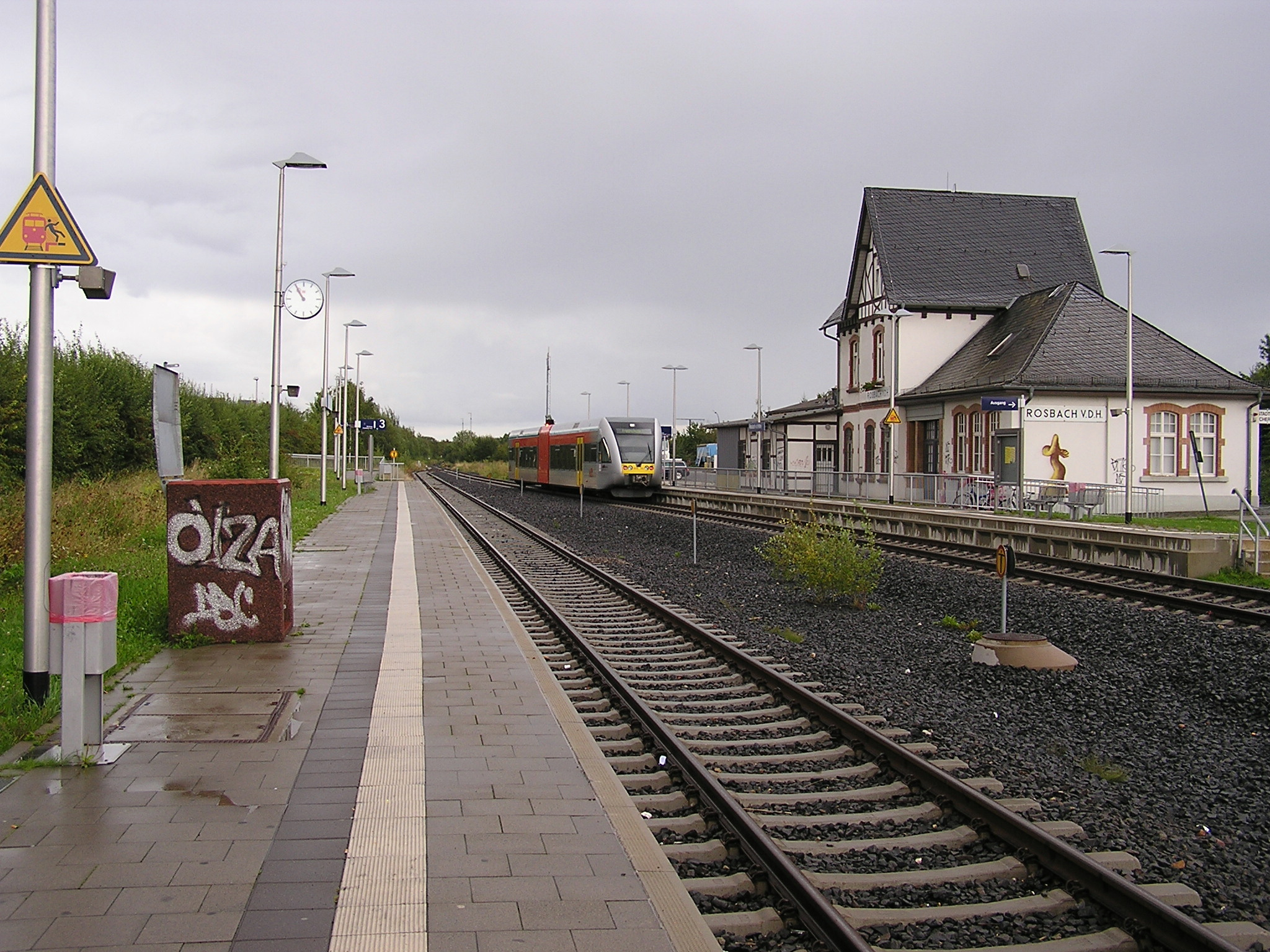

General information
- Location: Am Bahnhof 5; 61191 Rosbach vor der Höhe; Hesse; Germany
- Coordinates: 50.2980°N 8.7011°E
- Owner: DB Netz
- Operator: DB Station&Service
- Line: Friedberg–Friedrichsdorf railway
- Platforms: 2 side platforms
- Tracks: 2
- Train operators: DB Regio Mitte

Construction
- Accessible: Yes

Other information
- Station code: 5342
- DS100 code: FROS
- IBNR: 8005163
- Category: 6
- Fare zone: : 2625
- Website: www.bahnhof.de

History
- Opened: 15 July 1901; 125 years ago

Services
Preceding station	DB Regio Mitte	Following station
Friedberg Süd towards Friedberg	RB 16	Rodheim vor der Höhe towards Friedrichsdorf or Bad Homburg
Location
- Location within Hesse

Rosbach vor der Höhe station is a railway station in the municipality of Rosbach vor der Höhe, located in the Wetteraukreis district in Hesse, Germany. It has two side platforms.
