= Wöllstadt =

- Municipality
- Coat of arms

- Location of Wöllstadt within Wetteraukreis district
- Interactive map of Wöllstadt
- Location within Germany Location within Hesse
- Coordinates: 50°16′54″N 8°46′14″E
- Country: Germany
- State: Hesse
- Admin. region: Darmstadt
- District: Wetteraukreis
- Subdivisions: 2 districts

Government
  - Mayor (2018–24): Adrian Roskoni (Ind.)

Area
  - Total: 15.38 km^{2} (5.94 sq mi)
- Elevation: 145 m (476 ft)

Population (2025-12-31)
  - Total: 6,590
  - Density: 428/km^{2} (1,110/sq mi)
- Time zone: UTC+01:00 (CET)
  - Summer (DST): UTC+02:00 (CEST)
- Postal codes: 61206
- Dialling codes: 06034
- Vehicle registration: FB
- Website: www.woellstadt.de

Wöllstadt (German pronunciation: [ˈvœlʃtat]) is a municipality in the Wetteraukreis in Hesse, Germany. It is located approximately 20 kilometers north of Frankfurt am Main.
