= Friedberg–Friedrichsdorf railway =

Railway line in Germany

Friedrichsdorf–Friedberg railway
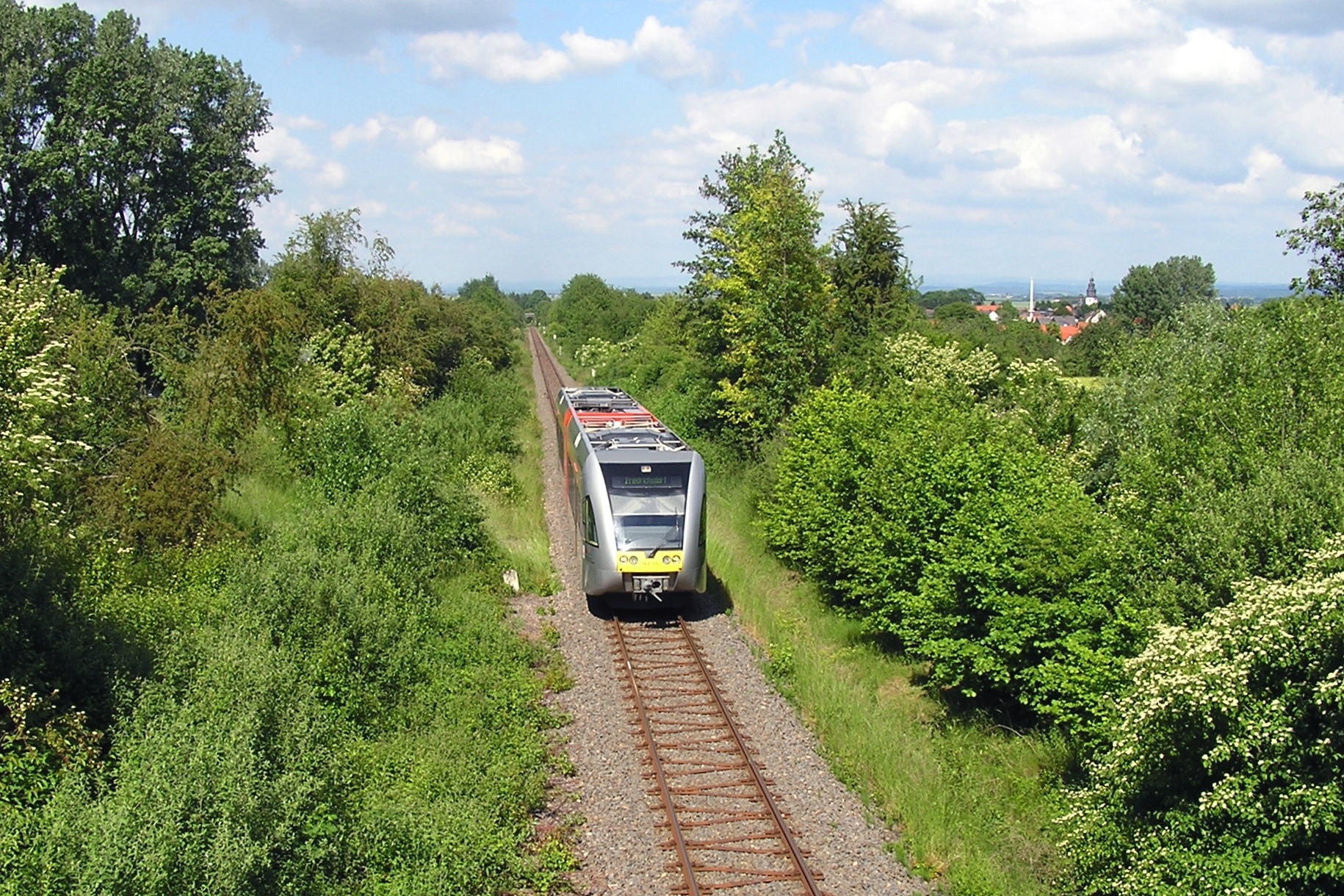
- GTW 2/6 set between Rodheim and Burgholzhausen

Overview
- Line number: 3611
- Locale: Hesse, Germany

Service
- Route number: 636

Technical
- Line length: 16.4 km (10.2 mi)
- Track gauge: 1,435 mm (4 ft 8 1/2 in) standard gauge
- Operating speed: 90 km/h (56 mph)

The Friedrichsdorf–Friedberg railway is a single-track, non-electrified branch line in the German state of Hesse. It is listed as timetable route 636 and integrated in the Rhein-Main-Verkehrsverbund as line 16.

== History ==
The planning of a connection to Friedberg as a continuation of the Homburg Railway began as early as 1868. However, it was not clear whether the connection to the Main-Weser Railway or a line to the Taunus would be built first. It was decided to build the Usingen Railway (Usinger Bahn), now called the Taunusbahn (Taunus Railway). Construction of the Friedrichsdorf–Friedberg link began in 1898 and the line was put into operation on 15 July 1901. The trains started at the terminus of Homburg vor der Höhe (also called Homburg Neu (new) station) on the lower Louisenstraße, which had been the starting point of the Usingen Railway since 1895. At the request of the emperor, Wilhelm II and to increase the capacity of the line from Frankfurt to Bad Homburg and from Friedrichsdorf to Friedberg, the line was upgraded to two tracks between 1907 and 1912 and a through station was built in Bad Homburg.

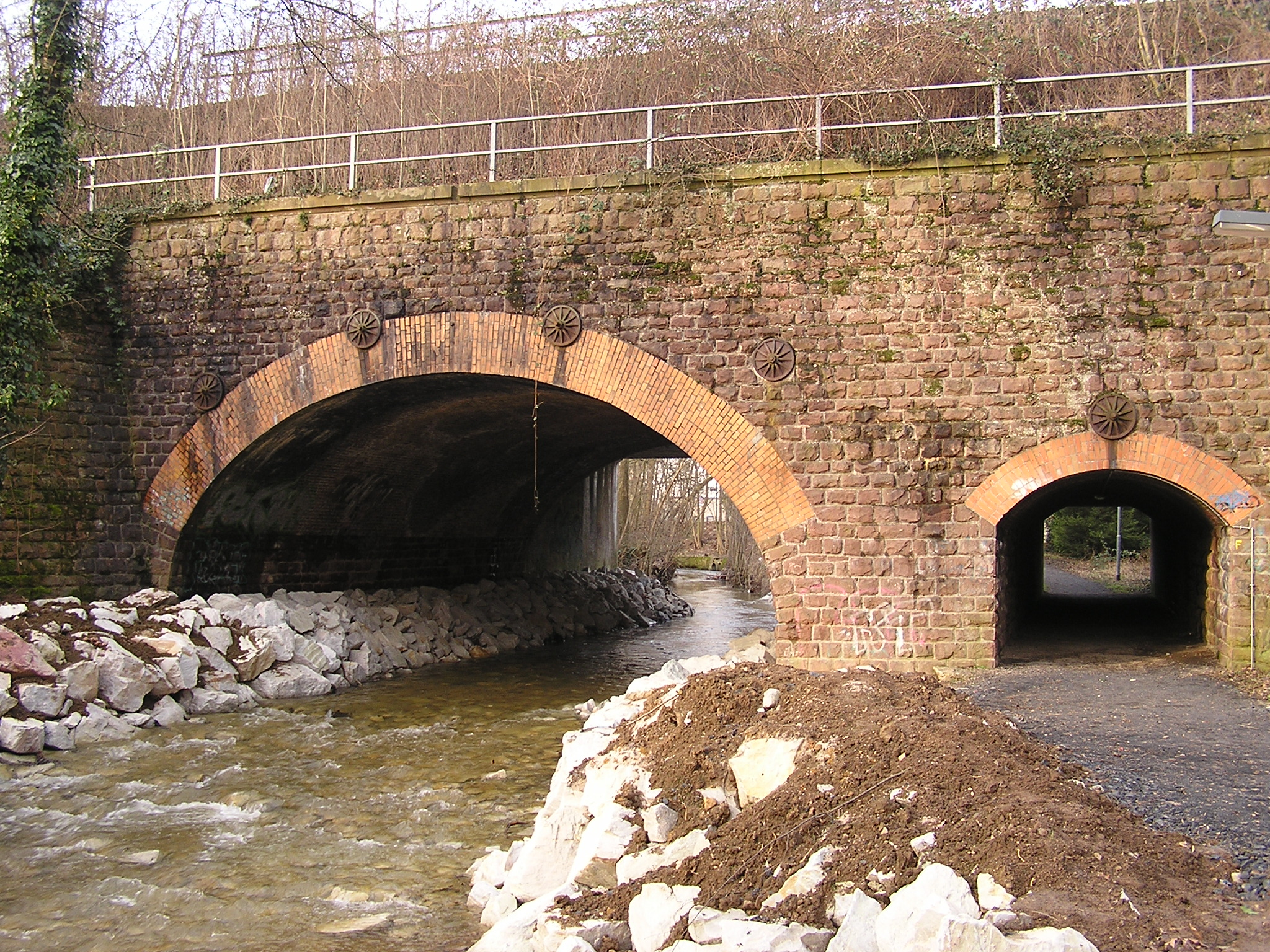
The Erlenbach Bridge in Burgholzhausen, which was built as an arch bridge in 1897. Behind it and clearly visible is the attached reinforced concrete bridge for the second track.

After the upgrade of the line, it was used by the trains of the Bad Nauheim–Wiesbaden railway (Bäderbahn), consisting of Eilzüge (fast-stopping trains) from Wiesbaden via Höchst and Bad Homburg to Bad Nauheim and a daily pair of Durchgangszüge (through trains) on the Berlin–Wiesbaden route.

Due to decreasing profitability, the second track was dismantled after the end of the First World War. With the takeover by the Nazis, it was restored for the planned Friedberg–Hungen–Alsfeld–Hersfeld line. During the Second World War, a bridge at the entrance to Friedberg station that carried the second track to the Main-Weser Railway was destroyed. Subsequently, the second track was dismantled, starting with the Friedberg–Rosbach section, which was completed by 1950, and later with the Rosbach–Friedrichsdorf section, which was completed by 1968. This also made the block post at Straßheim at the original ladder junction at the entrance to the station superfluous. Based on the width of the embankment and the bridges, the location of the former second track is still largely recognisable and a piece of it was maintained as a catch point at the junction to the industrial siding in Rosbach. The bridge over the line to Hanau still exists and it now carries a freight connection from the Main-Weser Railway to the goods yard above the station.

While the Frankfurt–Friedrichsdorf section was electrified and signalling control was transferred to the new centralised relay interlocking in Bad Homburg, the mechanical interlocking on this line was initially preserved and Rosbach was rebuilt in 1985 as a halt (Haltepunkt, that is without points). Also the sections of track became more operationally distinct at the end of the 20th century: the tight timing and the introduction of S-Bahn electric multiple units to Friedrichsdorf contrasted with the operations over the Friedrichsdorf–Friedberg line, which were mainly consisted of push-pull trains composed of Silberling (n-coaches) hauled by V 100 locomotives and Uerdingen railbuses; these were replaced by class 628 diesel multiple units, but services ran ever less frequently. The class 628 sets when not operating were usually stored outside Friedrichsdorf station towards Seulberg on a track to a no longer connected marshalling yard hump. With the commencement of S-Bahn operations to Friedrichsdorf and also to Friedberg, the normal Friedberg–Bad Homburg–Frankfurt through services were finally discontinued, although some long-distance trains still used the line. A 30 or 60-minute interval service was only re-introduced with the establishment of the Rhine-Main-Verkehrsverbund.

After previous considerations of closing the line, the Butzbach-Licher Eisenbahn (BLE), a subsidiary of the Hessische Landesbahn, took over operations on 24 May 1998. New Stadler GTW railcars were procured for this operation.

Due to its success and rising passenger numbers, there were also plans to restore the second track or even to electrify it. Only a few bridges would have had to be widened. A footbridge in Friedrichsdorf parallel to Färberstraße was increased in the meantime as part of its renewal to allow for a possible overhead line. However, more economical modernisation of the line was chosen. At the beginning of 2002, the tracks were completely renewed with Y-shaped sleepers. The stations were also renovated and a new station, Friedberg Süd, was added. The Rosbach vor der Höhe station, which is about halfway along it, was upgraded to become the crossing station, where trains could pass. The crossing in Rodheim was abandoned and the station was rebuilt as a halt with a single track. Finally, the signalling technology was modernised. Thus, the railway was downgraded from a main line to a branch line. For part of the construction work, traffic had to be blockaded for several weeks. On 21 April 2002, the re-commissioning was celebrated with two commuter trains shuttling over the line (a steam train and a GTW set). Next day, regular services commenced under a new timetable. This included not only an extended period when half-hourly services ran on weekdays but also a full service on the weekend. In addition, some connection times at the end stations were changed.

The replacement of the bridge over the former Federal Highway 3 at the halt of Friedberg Süd was carried out in July 2017 during a three-week full closure of the line.

== Route ==
The line now begins in the Friedrichsdorf station, where the Taunus Railway branches off. The railway runs on a wide turn to the right to the east. After crossing autobahn 5 the line reaches the halt of Friedrichsdorf-Burgholzhausen. The halt and former train station of Rosbach-Rodheim is located in the Wetterau after a level crossing; until 1992 it was often used for the loading of sugar beet as is typical in the Wetterau. This is followed by Rosbach vor der Höhe, now classified as a full station. Since 1987, there has been an industrial siding to the REWE Group warehouse, which has not been operated since 2000 and is now overgrown. The connecting points were upgraded in 2015. The is a second level crossing within the station area. Located on the edge of Friedberg is the newest halt on the line, Friedberg Süd. Here, until 2010, there was an industrial siding with an alternative access point on the right (to the south), which was still connected, but was no longer used. Since the embankment is relatively high, the actual track was reached by a zig zag. Like the REWE warehouse, the siding was integrated into the new interlocking technology by axle counter. After the former US barracks (Ray Barracks) the railway reaches Friedberg station, where it connects with the Main-Weser Railway. Before that, until the station was resignalled with an electronic interlocking, an industrial siding ran to the left (the town side/west) to Raiffeisen and the Ray Barracks.

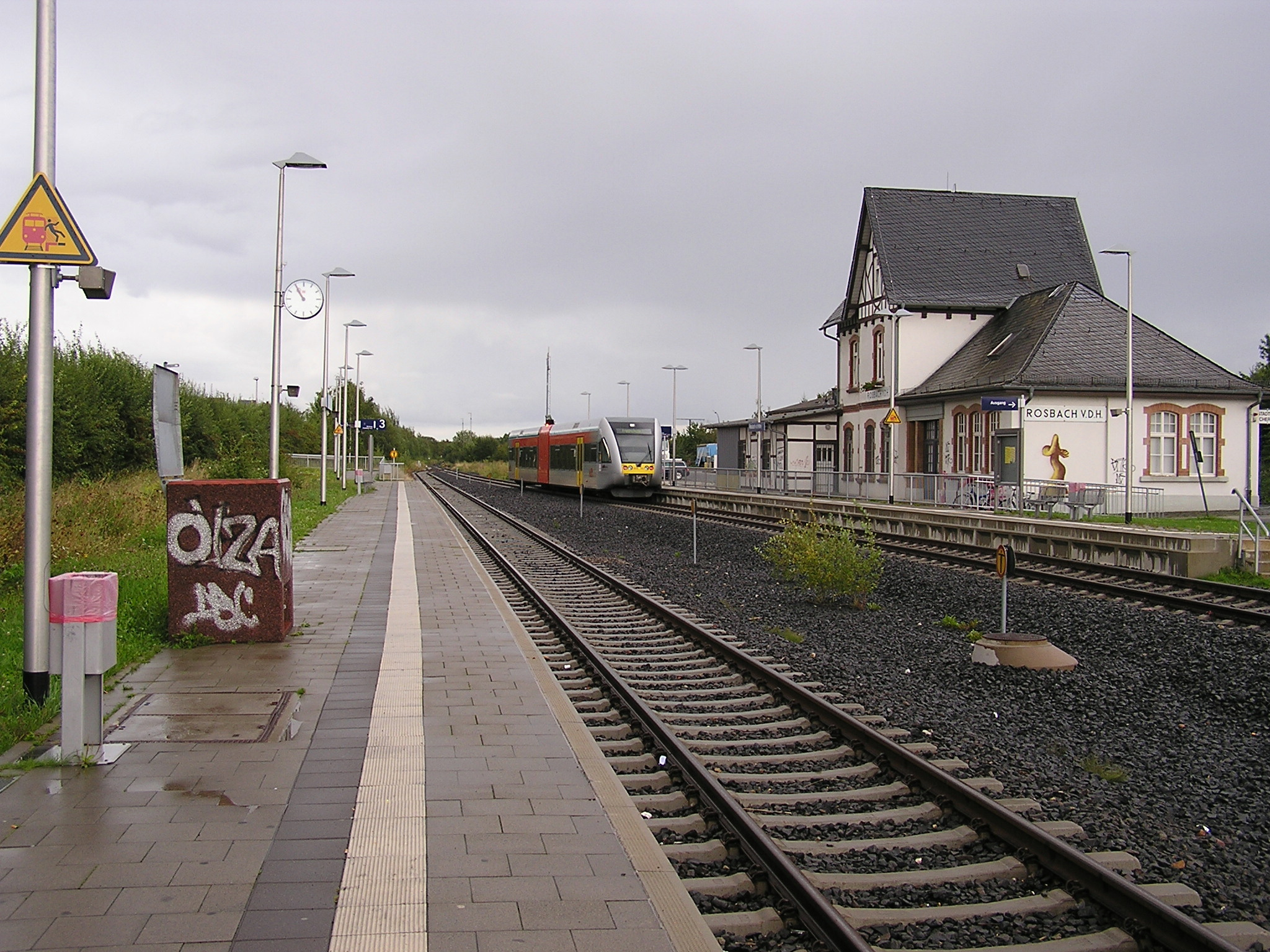
A GTW 2/6 set in Rosbach vor der Höhe station

The trains from Friedrichsdorf stop in Friedberg mostly at the bay platform 1a, rarely at the adjacent through platform 1. In Friedrichsdorf, trains mainly stop at track 4, rarely at the neighbouring track 5. Apart from the terminal stations, all platforms have a height of 55 centimetres and are barrier-free. Upgrading of Friedrichsdorf is being considered, but this is difficult because of the S-Bahn services that stop there.

The signals at Rosbach station and two level crossings in Rosbach and Rodheim are controlled via an electronic interlocking of the Sig L 90 class from a workstation at the signal box in Bad Homburg (on the Homburg Railway) and more precisely under direct traffic control mode with train control messages transmitted over analogue train radio. The entrance signal for Friedrichsdorf, like the whole station, is controlled by a relay interlocking directed from the Bad Homburg signal box. On the approach to Friedberg, a semaphore signal was formerly controlled by the local electro-mechanical signal box; on 25 October 2015, it was replaced by Ks signals (the most modern German standard for colour light signals) as part of its integration into the Friedberg electronic interlocking.

== Operations ==
The line is maintained by DB Netze and operated by HLB Hessenbahn GmbH until 2019. GTW 2/6 sets are used as rolling stock. The vehicles have an entry height of 55 centimetres, which is appropriate for the platforms at the various stations between the termini and are partially equipped with toilets. The densest service frequency is in the peak hour with a 30-minute interval with crossings in Rosbach.

== Prospects ==
As part of the possible electrification of the Taunus Railway, the RB 16 service is to be extended to provide capacity at Bad Homburg. This would require Rodheim station to be restored as a crossing point to optimise connections.
