= FKE =

FKE or Fke can refer to:

- Jetix Europe, a defunct European television broadcasting company from 1996 to 2019, by stock ticker
- Königstein Railway (German: Frankfurt-Königsteiner Eisenbahn), a train line in Hesse state, Germany

- Kelkheim station, a train station on the Königstein Railway, by DS100 station code

- Military Office of the Ministry of Defence, an office in the Swedish government from 1945 to 1979
