= Kelkheim =

- Town
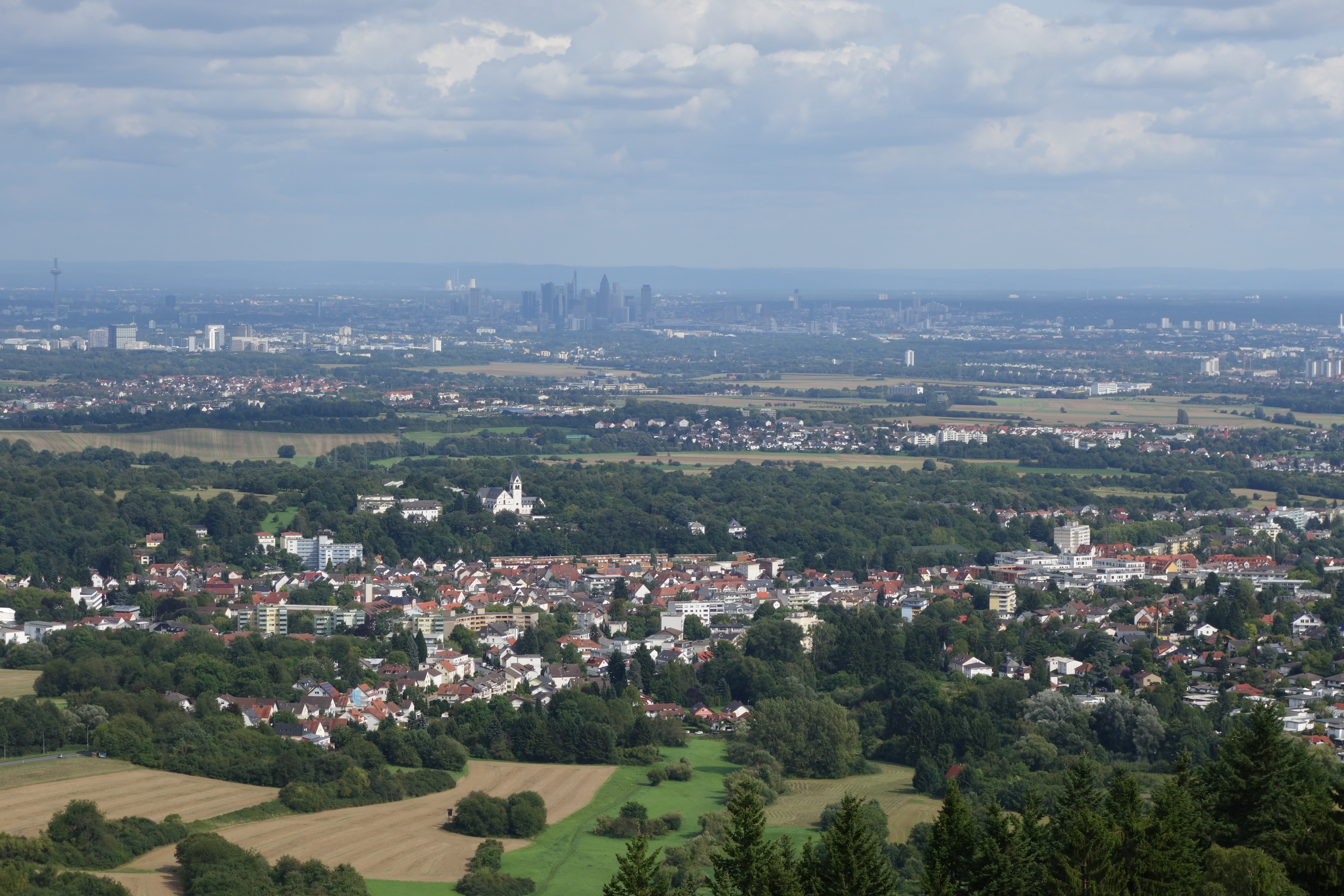
- View from mountain Staufen over Kelkheim

- Coat of arms

- Location of Kelkheim within Main-Taunus-Kreis district
- Interactive map of Kelkheim
- Location within Germany Location within Hesse
- Coordinates: 50°8′16″N 08°26′59″E
- Country: Germany
- State: Hesse
- Admin. region: Darmstadt
- District: Main-Taunus-Kreis
- Subdivisions: 6 Stadtteile

Government
  - Mayor (2021–27): Albrecht Kündiger

Area
  - Total: 30.73 km^{2} (11.86 sq mi)
- Elevation: 100–515 m (328–1,690 ft)

Population (2025-12-31)
  - Total: 28,041
  - Density: 912.5/km^{2} (2,363/sq mi)
- Time zone: UTC+01:00 (CET)
  - Summer (DST): UTC+02:00 (CEST)
- Postal codes: 65779
- Dialling codes: 06195, 06198 (Eppenhain), 06174 (Ruppertshain)
- Vehicle registration: MTK
- Website: www.kelkheim.de

Kelkheim (German: [ˈkɛlkhaɪm]), officially "Kelkheim (Taunus)", is a town in the Main-Taunus district in Hesse, Germany, close to Germany's financial center Frankfurt/Main.

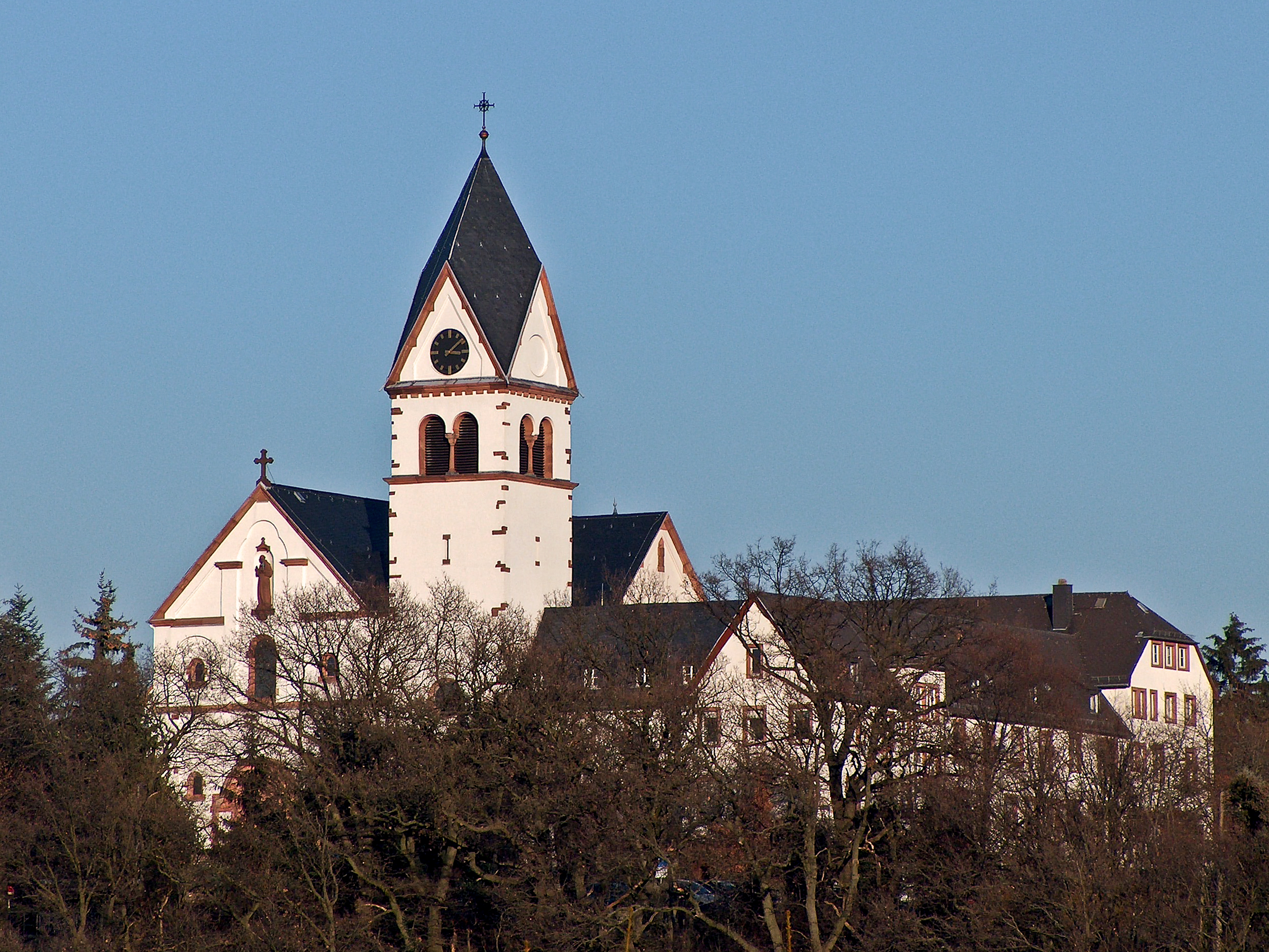
Former Franciscan abbey upon Klosterberg (abbey hill), landmark of Kelkheim

== Geography ==
=== Location ===
Located on the southwestern slopes of the Taunus mountains, Kelkheim is noted for its attractive scenery. Kelkheim is located approximately 10 km to the west of Frankfurt. Wiesbaden, the state capital of Hesse, is about 25 km away, while Mainz, the state capital of Rhineland-Palatinate, is about 30 km away.

== Town districts ==
Kelkheim is subdivided into six boroughs Kelkheim-Mitte, Münster, Hornau, Fischbach, Ruppertshain and Eppenhain.

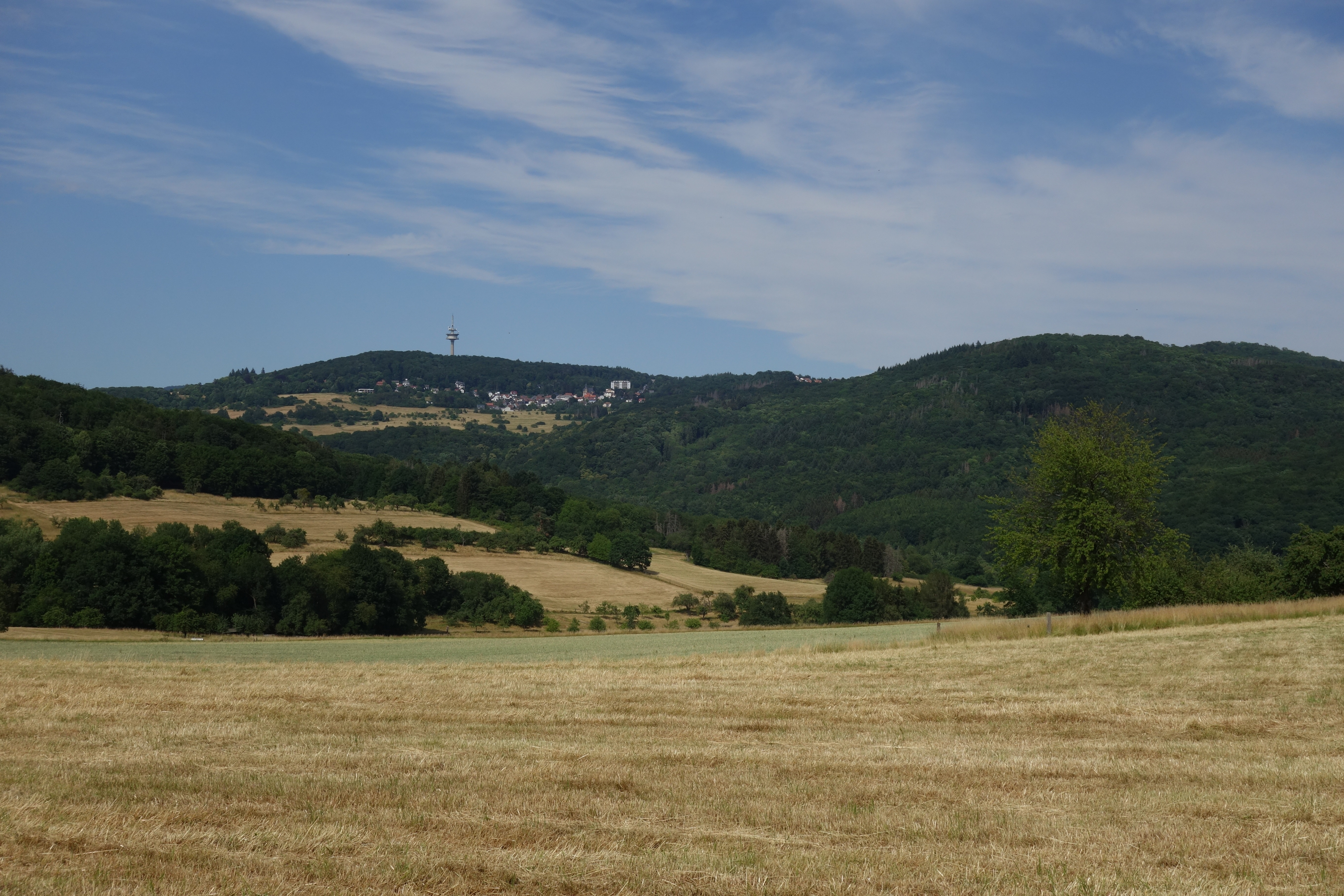
Atzelberg mountain (with radio tower) above Eppenhain; Rossert hilltop Hainkopf on the right

== Twin towns – sister cities ==
Kelkheim is twinned with:

- High Wycombe, England, United Kingdom (1985)
- Saint-Fons, France (1971)

== Public transport ==
Kelkheim station

Kelkheim station is connected to both Frankfurt and Königstein by rail, while bus connections exist to Eppstein, Königstein, Liederbach and Sulzbach. Frankfurt Airport serves as the city's main international airport and is located near to Kelkheim.
