= Königstein Railway =

Railway line in Germany

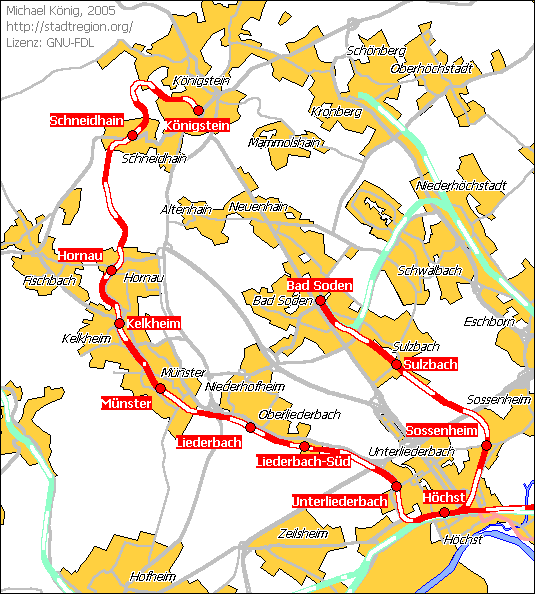
- Routes of the Königstein and Soden Railways

Overview
- Native name: Königsteiner Bahn
- Line number: 9360
- Locale: Hesse, Germany

Service
- Route number: 646

Technical
- Line length: 15.9 km (9.9 mi)
- Track gauge: 1,435 mm (4 ft 8 1/2 in) standard gauge
- Operating speed: 80 km/h (50 mph)
- Maximum incline: 2.5%

The Königstein Railway (Königsteiner Bahn) is a 1902 opened, single-track and non-electrified secondary railway line that connects the town of Königstein im Taunus with the city of Frankfurt am Main on the southern edge of the Taunus in the German state of Hesse.

The Regionalbahn line, which was also called the K-Bahn from 1989 to 1995, now runs from Koenigstein via Frankfurt-Höchst station as timetable route 646 to Frankfurt (Main) Hauptbahnhof.

== Route ==
The line consists of a single track, but there are passing loops at the stations of Liederbach, Kelkheim and Hornau as well as at the end stations.

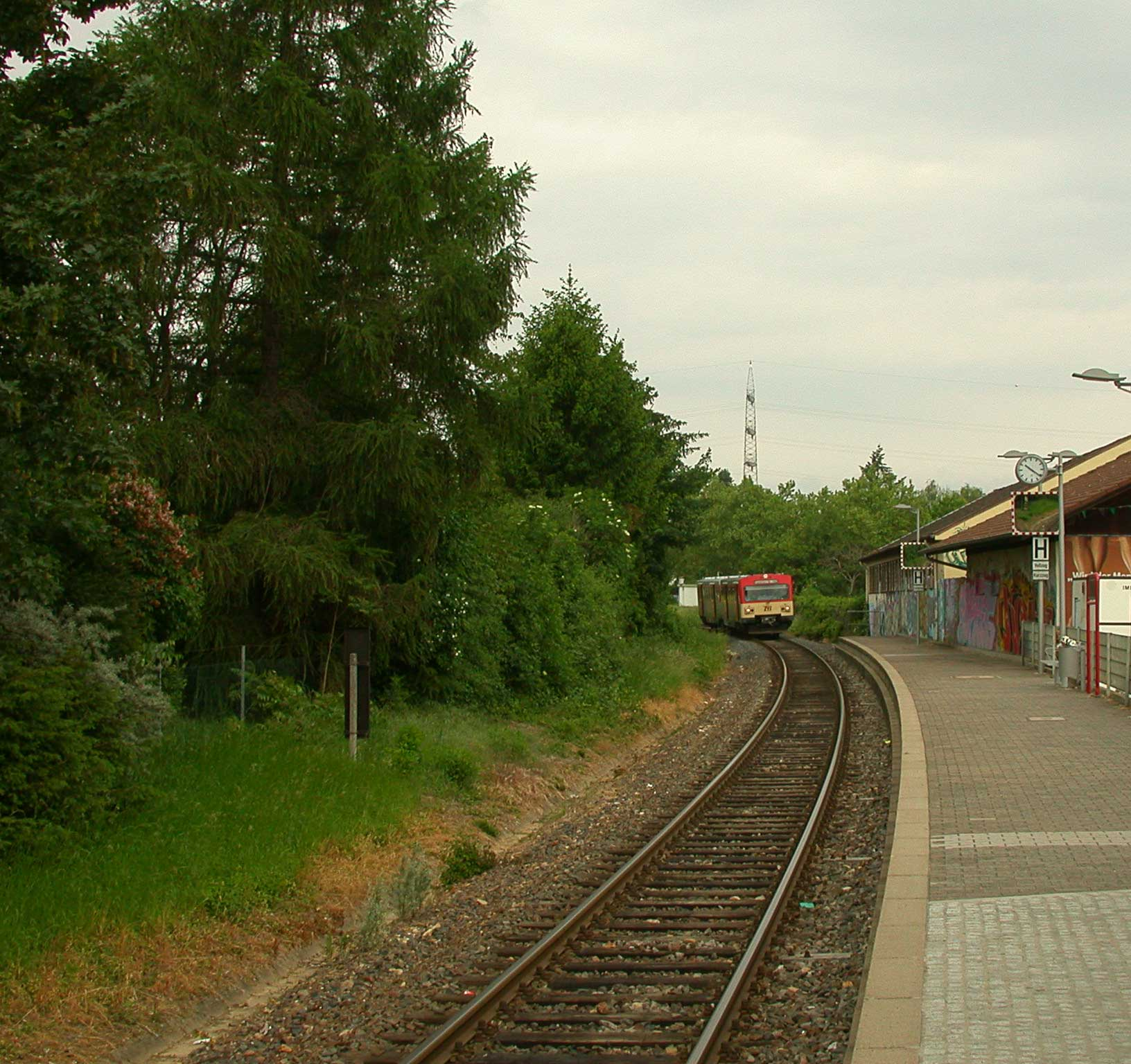
Frankfurt-Unterliederbach station, looking to the north

In Höchst, the railway leaves the railway embankment used by the S-Bahn and branches off to the northwest, soon reaching its last stop in the Frankfurt city area at Frankfurt-Unterliederbach, which used to be classified as a Bahnhof (station), but it has since been reduced to a Haltepunkt (halt, that is it has no sets of points).

After the railway passes under an autobahn bridge, it reaches the first station in the Main-Taunus-Kreis, Liederbach Süd. This relatively new halt serves in particular the commercial area of the community. This is followed by Liederbach station, which is located exactly on the border of the two districts of Oberliederbach and Niederhofheim and provides the first crossing opportunity after Höchst. Prior to the incorporation of the two districts into Liederbach, the station was called Niederhofheim-Oberliederbach. The second track is occasionally used, such as during delays.

After running through fields and meadows, the railway reaches the halt of Münster, then the centre of the town of Kelkheim, where train crossings takes place. Stopping times deviate from the usual symmetry minute, with the scheduled arrival times is both direction being at 11 and 41 minutes after each hour. Shortly later, the railway reaches Hornau station, where the signal box controlling the line is located.

The Königstein Railway then passes through the Kelkheim municipal forest (Stadtwald) and reaches the southern boundary of Königstein, which is also the beginning of Hochtaunuskreis. After passing through the halt of Schneidhain and a 180° turn to the east, the line reaches Königstein station and thus the end of the line.

== Operator ==
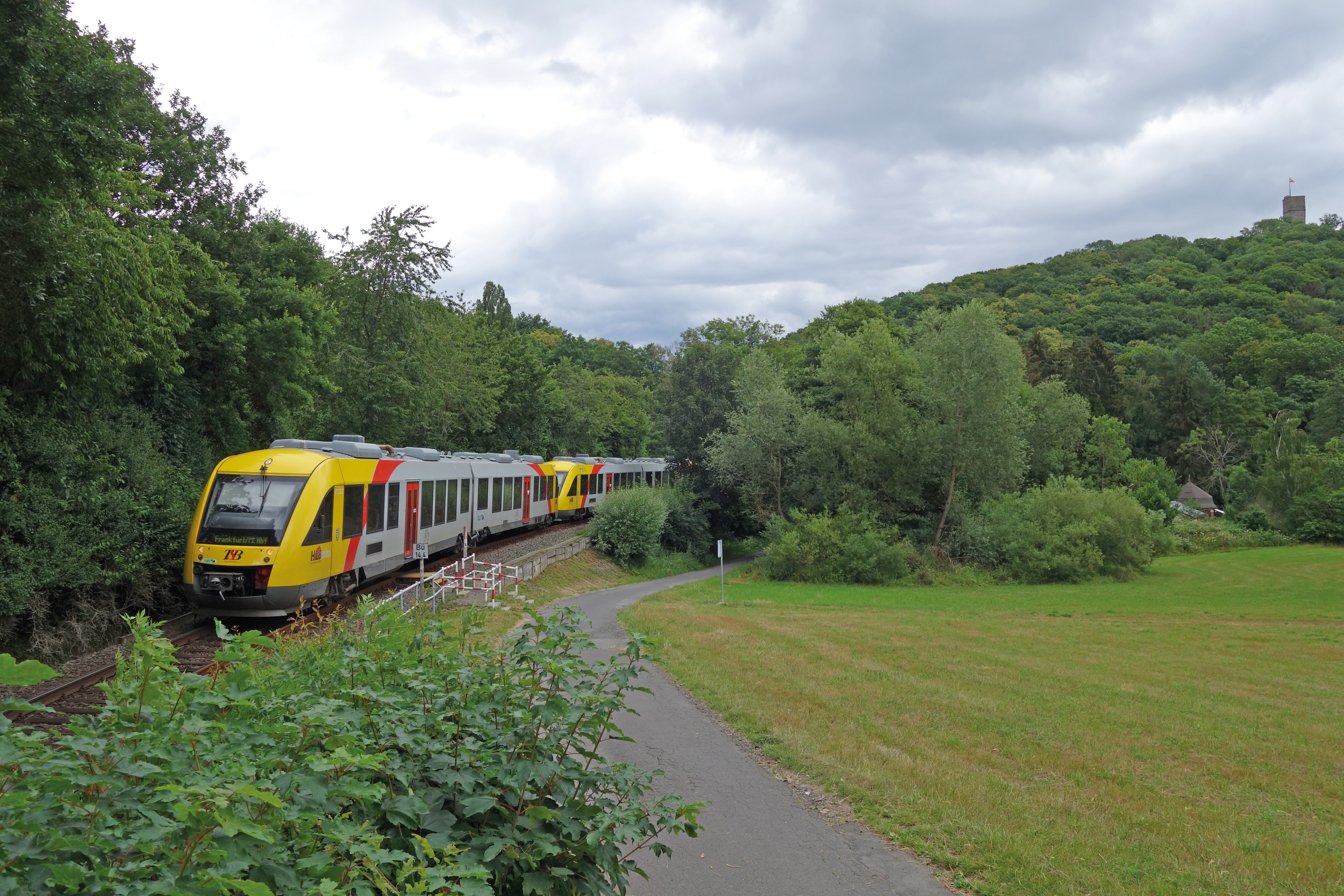
LINT 41 railcar underneath Königstein Castle heading for Frankfurt

The Hessische Landesbahn operates the Königstein Railway as part of the network of the Rhein-Main-Verkehrsverbund (Rhine-Main transport association, RMV), as RMV line 12 (RB 12) until 2019. To make the line more attractive, it now also runs via the Taunus Railway between Frankfurt-Höchst and Frankfurter Hauptbahnhof. It now represents an important addition to the Rhine-Main S-Bahn.

== History ==
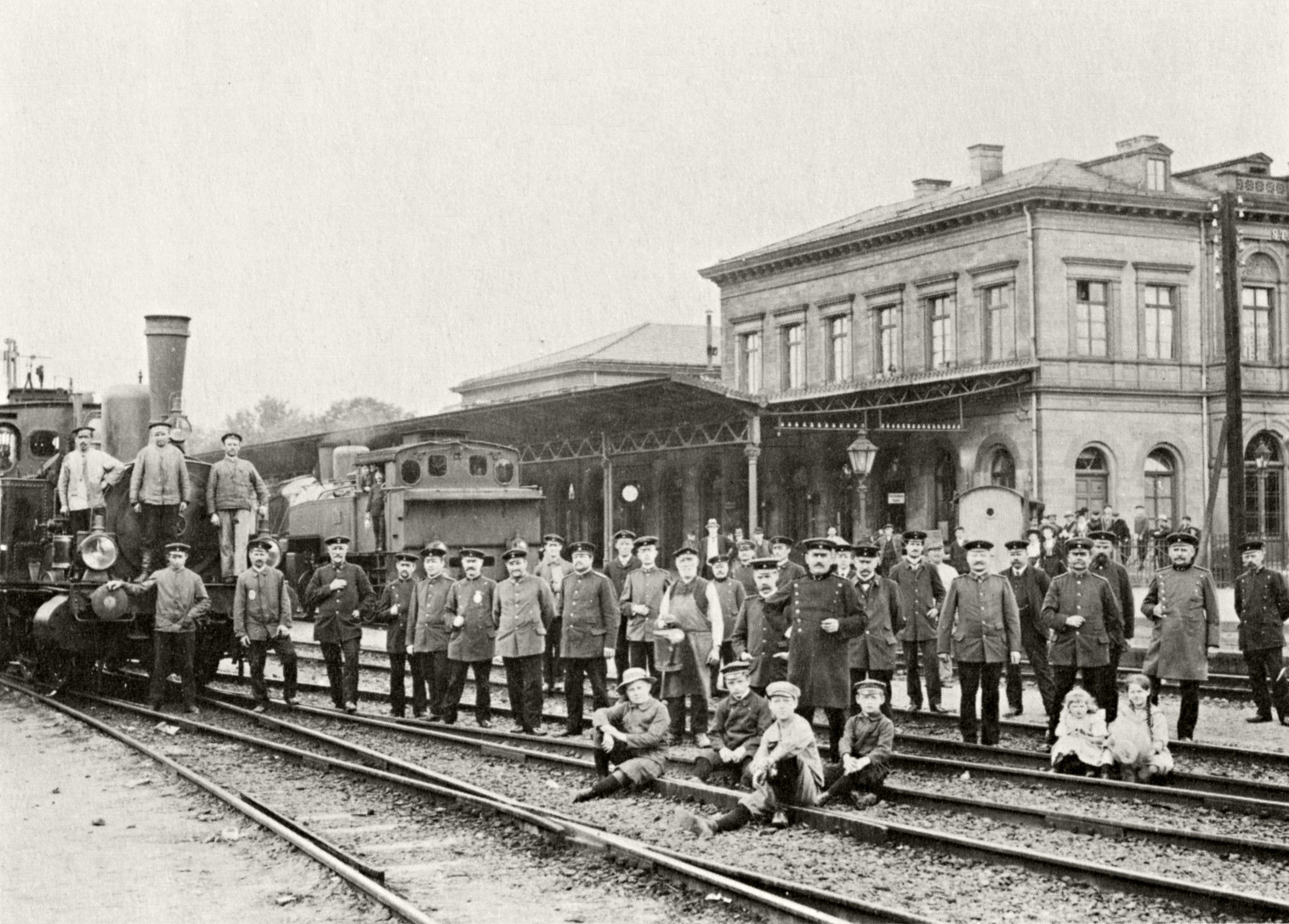
Inauguration of the Königstein Railway in 1902

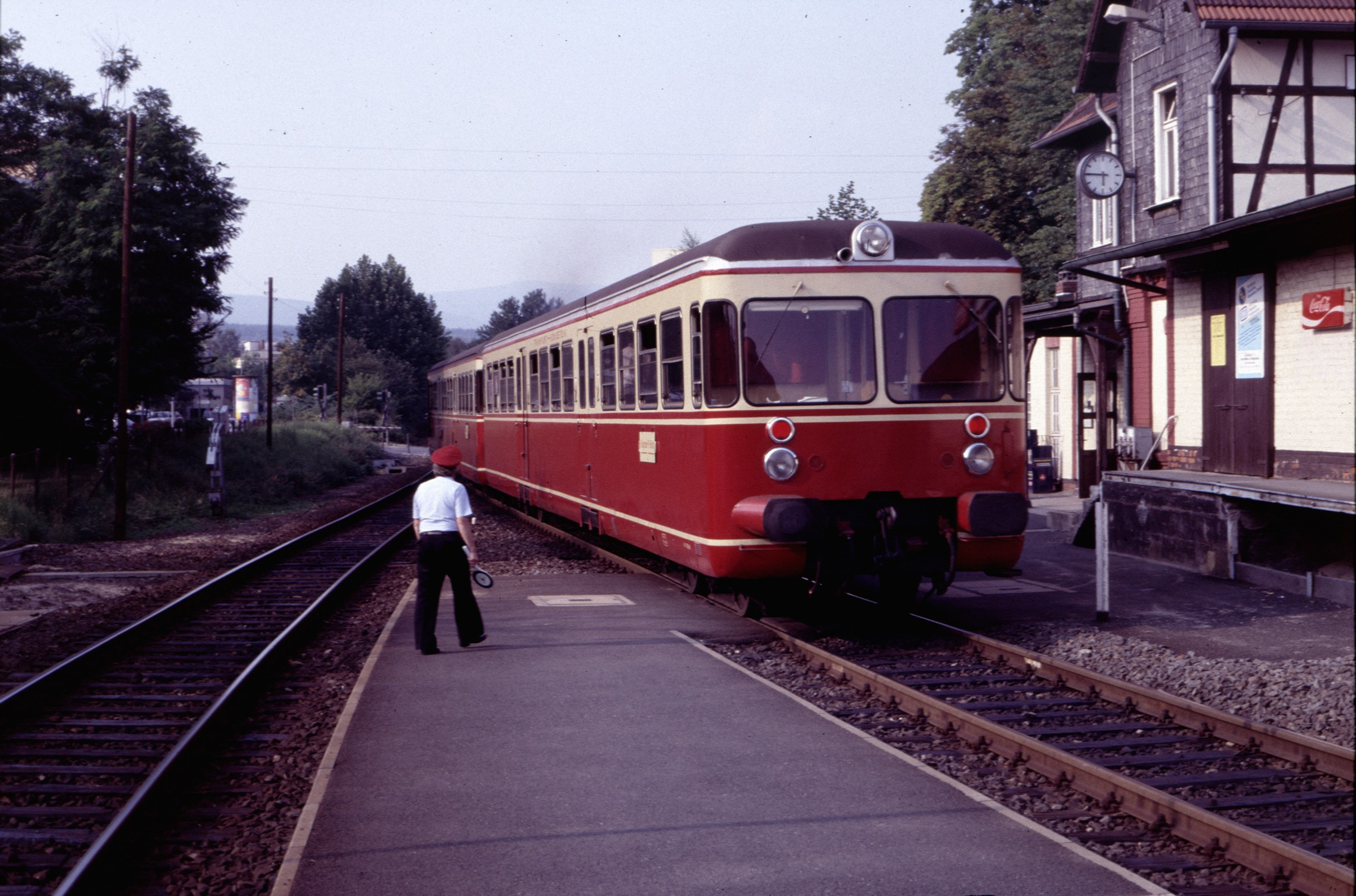
Esslingen railbuses were in service from 1959 to 1987, seen here leaving Kelkheim station.

Its operating company, the Kleinbahn AG Höchst-Königstein gained a concession to build the Königstein Railway in 1901 as a Kleinbahn (light railway); this company later developed into the Frankfurt-Königsteiner Eisenbahn (FKE). Construction began at the Höchst am Main station (before its incorporation into Frankfurt) on the Taunus Railway. The line was opened on 24 February 1902. The company first had bought three locomotives which were similar to the Prussian T 9.1. Followed by three more of the same type in 1903 (sold in 1910), 1913 and 1924 as well as a Prussian T 3 in 1906, there were no further machines up to 1947 when two Palatine P 5 from Deutsche Reichsbahn were bought. Apart from few other steam locomotives, which were partly short time lend, the FKE switched powers to diesel engines, buying several Esslingen railbuses in 1959 and renting Class V 100 and Class V 160 from Deutsche Bundesbahn operating as push-pull trains with "Silberling"-coaches. Since 1987 the FKE runs railcars VT 2E by Linke-Hofmann-Busch. Since 2006 the fleet consists of LINT 41 railcars, too.

=== Train crash near Oberliederbach in 1966 ===
On 17 November 1966, there was a heavy train crash on the line between Unterliederbach and Liederbach. While the train's driver had left to take a break, the three-car diesel multiple unit, which had been waiting unattended in Kelkheim Hornau, started moving towards Frankfurt, because the parking brake had not been activated. Due to the gradient of the track, the train accelerated to well over 100 km/h. An attempt to derail the train in Kelkheim-Münster failed.

The railcar finally collided head-on with an oncoming passenger train at Oberliederbach. The driver and fireman of the steam locomotive saved themselves by jumping off. Seven passengers died and there were 80 injured in the accident. The dead included the only passenger on the driverless railcar. For unknown reasons, the twenty-two-year-old had not been able to pull the emergency brake to prevent the disaster, or at least alleviate its extent and perhaps save his life.

Another train from Frankfurt was prevented from continuing towards Liederbach just in time.

=== K-Bahn ===
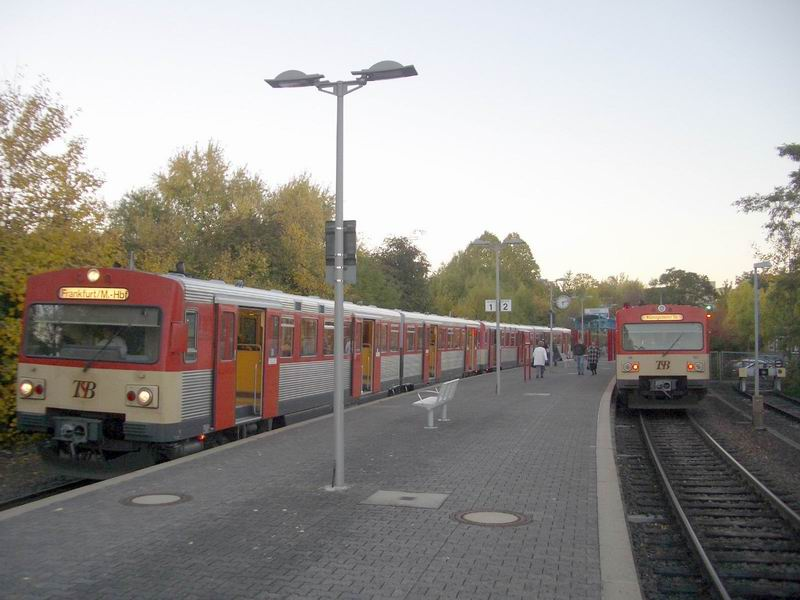
Trains type VT 2E crossing in Kelkheim station

From 1989 to 1995, the line had the brand name of K-Bahn, which, despite its short lifespan, is still often used today. In addition, the former light railway was highlighted on the line map of the former Frankfurter Verkehrsverbund (Frankfurter transport association, FVV) with its own colour. Similarly, in 1993, when the branch line also operated by the FKE under the name of Taunus Railway was revived and it was given the brand name of T-Bahn.

In 1995, the Rhein-Main-Verkehrsverbund (RMV) was founded, thus ending the short history of the K and T-Bahns. Both were named using the uniform RMV numbering scheme (lines 12 and 15).

== Prospects ==
At the beginning of November 2014, it was announced that the Rhein-Main-Verkehrsverbund and Alstom had agreed to use new railcars with fuel cell propulsion (iLINT) on the lines of the Taunus network (12, 13, 15 and 21) from 2018 at the earliest.
