= Kelkheim station =

Railway station in Kelkheim, Germany

Kelkheim
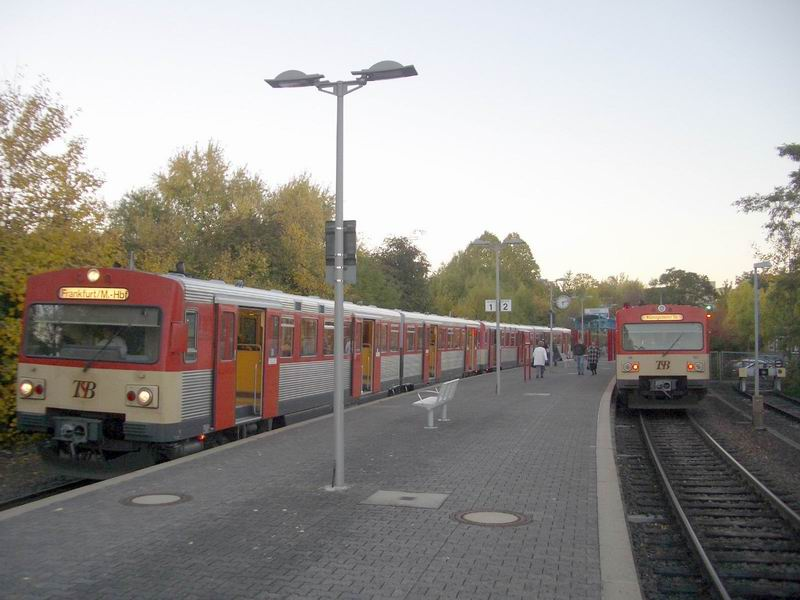
- Trains crossing in Kelkheim station

General information
- Location: Kelkheim, Hesse; Germany
- Coordinates: 50°08′15″N 8°26′52″E
- System: Crossing station
- Line: Königstein Railway (km 8.6)
- Platforms: 2

Other information
- Station code: n/a
- DS100 code: FKE
- IBNR: 8007161
- Fare zone: : 6626

History
- Opened: 1902
Location
- Location within Hesse

Kelkheim station is the most important station on the Königstein Railway from Höchst to Königstein on the western edge of Frankfurt am Main in the German state of Hesse. It is the location of the scheduled train crossings on the single track line. It is the middle one of three stations in the town of Kelkheim and serves the districts of Kelkheim-Mitte and Fischbach.

== History ==
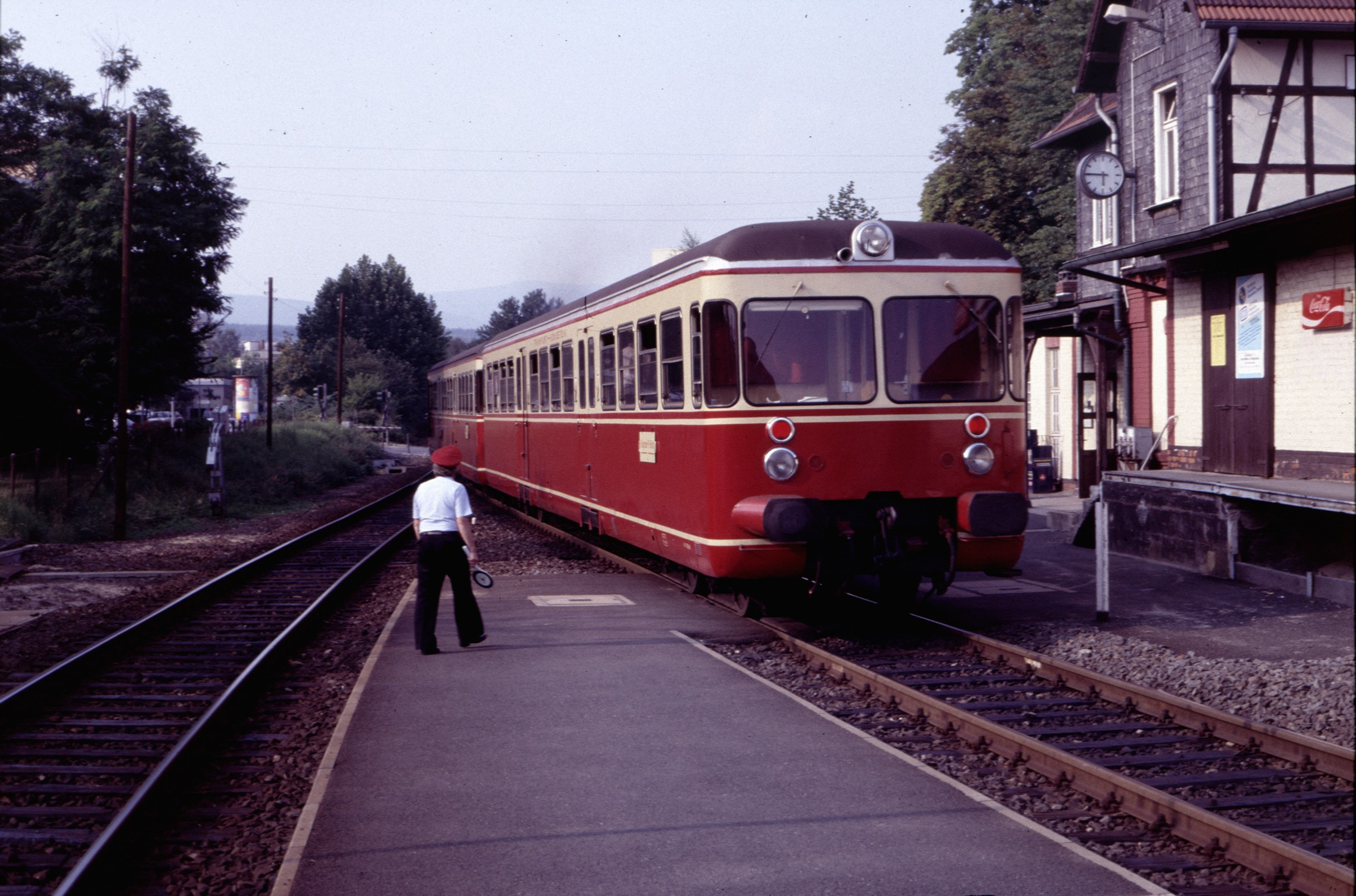
Esslingen railbus in Kelkheim in 1984

When planning the line, a joint station was originally planned for Kelkheim and Münster, midway between the two towns. The municipality of Fischbach however, also requested access to the railway and threatened to deny the railway company the right to build the railway though its territory towards Hornau. Finally, a building site was selected outside the former village of Kelkheim on the road to Fischbach. As a result, the station was named Kelkheim-Fischbach.

The station was opened together with the Königstein Railway on 24 February 1902. It had two tracks for passenger trains and a third for loading freight between two platforms. During the extension of the post road (now Friedrichstraße), a brick passage with a clear width of 1.50 m was built under all three tracks. The station had a water crane for the refilling of steam locomotives running uphill. From the very beginning, there was a considerable amount of general freight, mainly for the loading of furniture manufactured in Kelkheim and the delivery of the required wood. A siding was built in 1905 to the Hoffmann kiln of Heinrich Müller immediately north of the Fischbacher Straße level crossing. The siding was dismantled in 1952 and the Berliner Ring housing estate has been built on the site of the brickyard.

In 1928, the tracks were extended mainly because there were no storage areas for the transport of timber. At the southern end, another siding was planned to the Dichmann company on the route now used by the street of Mittelweg, but this was eventually built in 1948 as a narrow-gauge (600 mm) Feldbahn. A gantry crane was built in 1944 for loading; this was replaced in 1959 by a new crane. Although the field railway was abandoned in the 1960s, the crane remained until 1980. Today this area is occupied by Wilhelmstraße and the station parking area.

After the incorporation of Hornau and Münster in 1938 and the decision of the still independent neighbouring municipality of Fischbach to waive its naming rights in 1977, it was decided to rename Kelkheim-Fischbach station as Kelkheim Hauptbahnhof (main station), but eventually it was decided to call it Kelkheim station. After the Second World War, there were other proposals, including building another siding, where the trains coming from Höchst could leave wagons in order to avoid the need for a second locomotive on the steep route to Königstein. An extension of the entrance building with a kiosk, toilets and a ticket office was built in 1950. Until the construction of the central signal box in Hornau station in 1989, Kelkheim was also the base for train operations.

At the end of the 1970s, there were suggestions that the line from Frankfurt should end at Kelkheim station, but it was decided to renovate all of the line in 1984. The station was converted for S-Bahn-like operations in 1981, creating the current configuration with a 76 cm-high island platform and two sidings.

== Entrance building ==
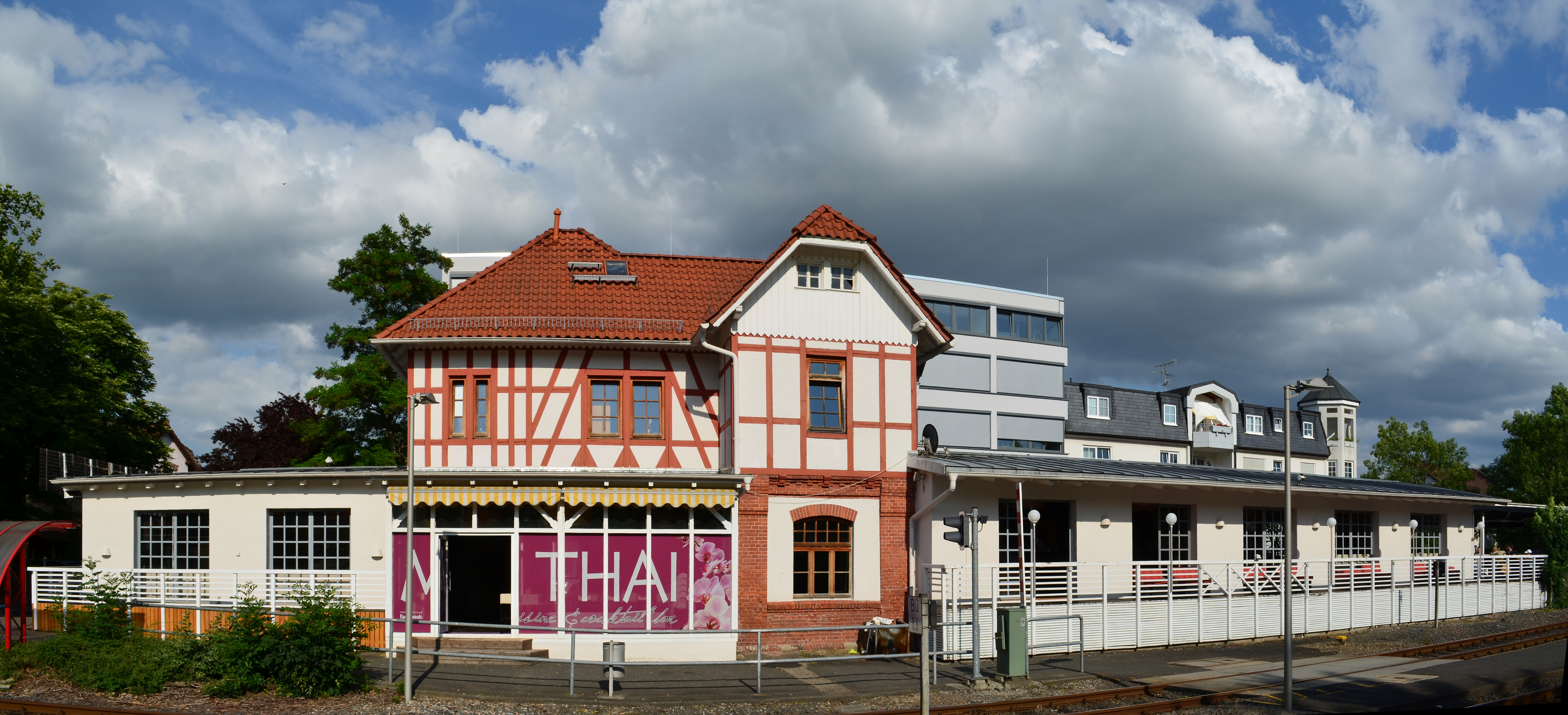
Track side of the entrance building

The entrance building is a two-storey half-timbered building with an Avant-corps on one side and a wooden platform canopy. The design is exactly mirrored in the entrance building of Münster station. There is an annexed goods shed built in brickwork. The entrance building is listed as a cultural monument under the Hessian monument protection law. A few years after opening, the half-timbered facade on the south-west and north-west side was covered with slate, which was removed in the 1990s. After the end of the railway's own use of the building, it was used as a pub, but it is now a restaurant.

== Operations ==
=== Rail ===
The station now has two sidings with a common island platform and two sidings ending to the north without platforms. The only access to the platform is via a pedestrian crossing over the eastern track, which is protected by a barrier at the northern end of the platform, directly opposite the bus stop. There is a parking lot to the southeast, although a considerable walk is required to reach the platform to the northeast.

The Hessische Landesbahn operates the Königstein Railway both as a train operator in the network of the Rhein-Main-Verkehrsverbund as RMV line 12 as well as an infrastructure company and is thus responsible for the maintenance of the station. To make the line more attractive, it also operates today via the Taunus Railway between Frankfurt-Höchst and Frankfurt Hauptbahnhof. It is now an important addition to the Rhine-Main S-Bahn. The Frankfurter Verkehrsverbund (Frankfurt transport association, FVV) operated the line between 1989 and 1995 under the brand name of K-Bahn.

The trains running to Königstein and Frankfurt usually meet in Kelkheim station. The trains run every half hour on weekdays, but only hourly on Sundays and public holidays.

=== Bus ===
Bus stops are located on the north side of the entrance building. The regional bus routes 263 and 804 of the Hessischen Landesbahn connect the station with Königstein, Glashütten, Liederbach, the Main-Taunus-Zentrum shopping centre in Sulzbach, Frankfurt, Kriftel and Hofheim. Since the 2009/2010 timetable change on 13 December 2009, night bus line n83, which operates at night between Konstablerwache in Frankfurt and Eppstein station, has stopped at Kelkheim station.
