= Eppstein =

- Town
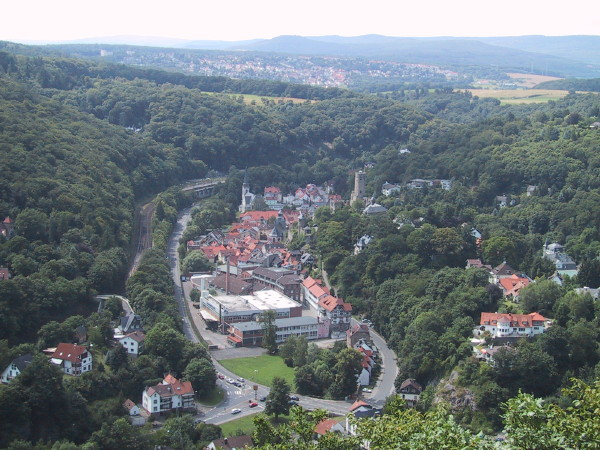
- Eppstein seen from the Kaisertempel

- Coat of arms

- Location of Eppstein within Main-Taunus-Kreis district
- Interactive map of Eppstein
- Location within Germany Location within Hesse
- Coordinates: 50°08′N 08°24′E
- Country: Germany
- State: Hesse
- Admin. region: Darmstadt
- District: Main-Taunus-Kreis

Government
  - Mayor (2019–2025): Alexander Simon (CDU)

Area
  - Total: 24.19 km^{2} (9.34 sq mi)
- Elevation: 255 m (837 ft)

Population (2025-12-31)
  - Total: 13,058
  - Density: 539.8/km^{2} (1,398/sq mi)
- Time zone: UTC+01:00 (CET)
  - Summer (DST): UTC+02:00 (CEST)
- Postal codes: 65817
- Dialling codes: 06198
- Vehicle registration: MTK
- Website: www.eppstein.de

Eppstein (German pronunciation: [ˈɛpʃtaɪn]) is a town in the Main-Taunus-Kreis, in Hesse, Germany. Eppstein lies west of Frankfurt am Main, around 12 km (7.5 mi) north east of the state capital Wiesbaden, and is at the edge of the Taunus mountains. The ruins of the Eppstein castle is a prominent landmark, and houses a museum.

== Geography ==
=== Neighbouring municipalities and areas ===
To the north, Eppstein borders the city of Idstein in Rheingau-Taunus-Kreis, and the municipality of Glashütten in Hochtaunuskreis. To the east is the city of Kelkheim, to the south the city of Hofheim, and to the west the city of Wiesbaden and the municipality of Niedernhausen.

=== City arrangement ===
Eppstein consists of five areas: Bremthal, Ehlhalten, Eppstein, Niederjosbach and Vockenhausen.

==== Bremthal ====
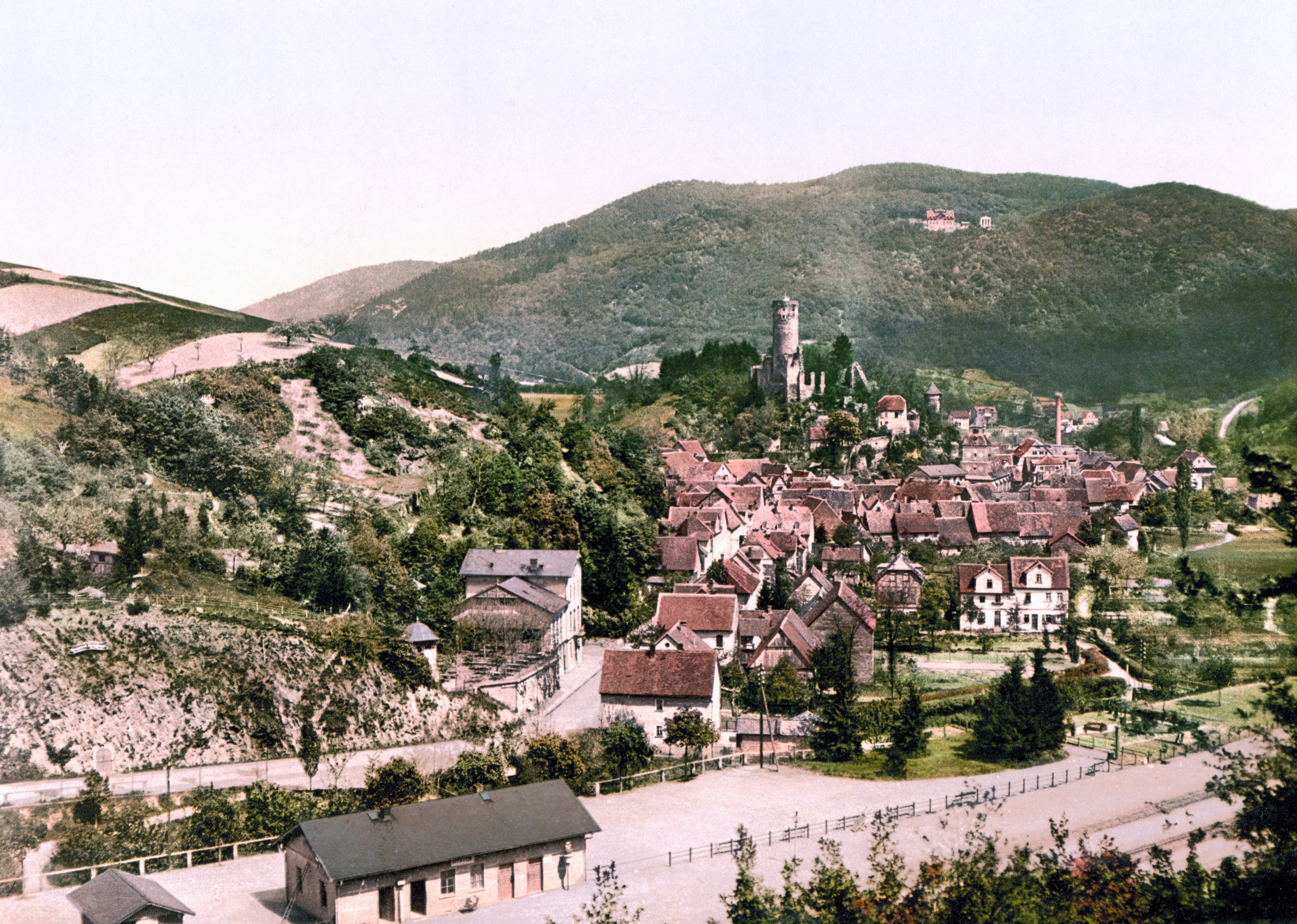
Eppstein and the ruin of Castle Eppstein, between 1890 and 1905

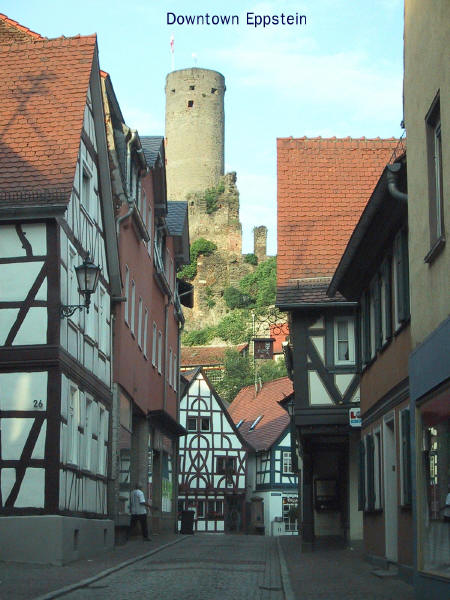
Eppstein and the Wernerplatz, in the centre of the old town.

Bremthal has a rapid-transit railway stop on line S2. With approximately 5,000 inhabitants, Bremthal is the most populous quarter of Eppstein, and is the economic and cultural centre. Bremthal has several associations; e.g. a brass band, Gesangverein Germania ('Germania singing association'), Gesangverein Liederkranz ('Liederkranz singing association'), an association of small animal breeders, and a volunteer fire brigade. ose to Wildsachsenerstraße is a small skate park, and a forest path.

Bremthal was founded by the Lords of Eppstein in the 10th/11th century because the narrow valley around their castle did not allow for arable land. Bremthal's church, St. Margareta, was built in 1889. The church has a baptismal font (1749) from an earlier church on the site.

==== Niederjosbach ====
Niederjosbach has a rapid transit railway stop on line S2, as well as a bus connection to the Wiesbadener transportation network.

Motorway connections are about 3 minutes away. In Niederjosbach is a large campsite, the terrace-like "Taunuscamp", which is on the Sonnenhang. It is open all year round. The Gusbacher Carnevalsclub (GCC) organizes several meetings annually, and on "carnival Tuesday", a noteworthy parade by the village's local associations; two sport clubs, two singing clubs, a fruit and horticulture club, church choir, fire-brigade, Gusbacher chaoten ('carnival parade organisers'), federation of housewives, German Red Cross local association and neighbourhood municipalities. There is an industrial area and several craft enterprises, as well as an urban kindergarten with three groups. The Catholic community centre Am Honigbaum (lit. 'at the honey tree') is used for church and also for private and other social meetings. The place has been part of Eppstein since 1972. The Niederjosbach coat of arms has a silver fir tree on a red background.

==== Vockenhausen ====
Vockenhausen is the seat of the mayor. It has around 4,500 people. The administration is distributed between the two city halls in Vockenhausen and Eppstein. On the Vockenhäuser Gemarkung are the Freiherr-vom-Stein-Schule (comprehensive school) and the Burg-Schule (primary school).

This Stadtteil (transl. city district) of Eppstein was founded around 1100 by the Lords of Eppstein and belonged to them until they died out in 1535. Historically, the area was a site for manufacturing. A number of mills (e.g. for grinding grain, dye-making, leather-tanning, and iron extraction) made use of the stream that runs through the town.

The sculpture before the Vockenhausen turn-off between Alt-Eppstein and Bremthal is a reminder of Vockenhausen's Schmelzmühle ('smelting mill') as well as Vockenhausen's two well-known artists Robert and Ella Bergmann-Michel, who lived at the mill from the 1920s until their deaths.

The sunny hillside of Vockenhausen is home to many families and Eppstein's elementary and middle schools; the valley has a number of traditional German, as well as Greek, Italian, and Chinese restaurants, a few bakeries, guest houses, hair salons, doctors' offices, a tanning and waxing salon, drugstores, dry cleaners/post office, and local grocery stores.

The Bergstraße — also called the Schmerzberg (lit. 'Pain mountain') during an annual 1 May bike race — goes over the hill to Alt-Eppstein.

==== Ehlhalten ====
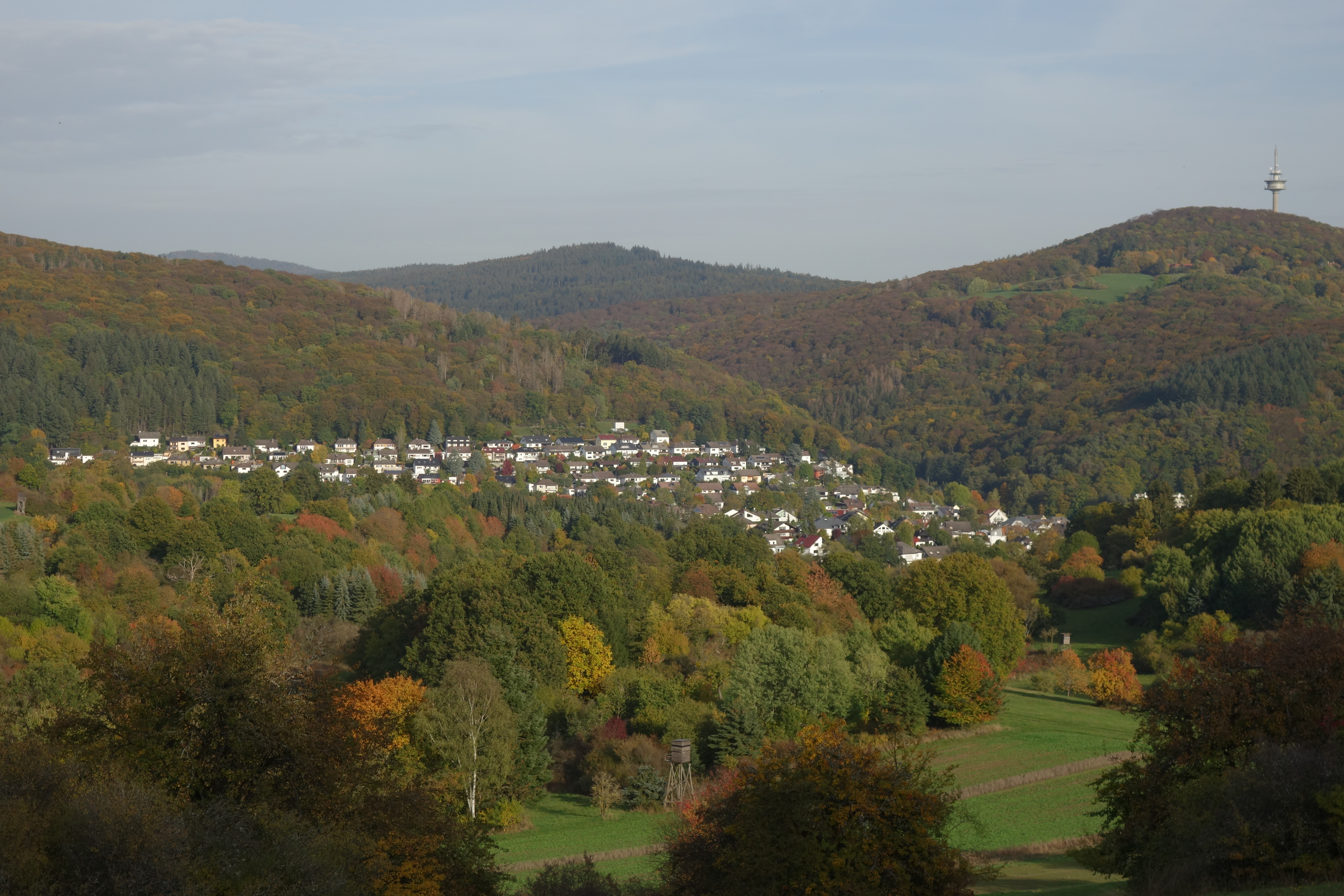
Northern part of Ehlhalten underneath Spitzeberg mountain (449,5 m) on the left; Atzelberg (506,7 m) on the right, in the middle of the background Eichkopf near Ruppertshain (563,3 m, highest mountain of Main-Taunus-Kreis district)

Ehlhalten is the part with the fewest inhabitants (about 1,350) but the largest area due to its rather big forests. According to legend, Ehlhalten once provided a cutter that tailors used at the water of the brook in Ehlhalten. As the water rose and fell, affecting the measurement of the inch, people cried: "Elle halten!" ("transl. hold the inch!"), leading to the name Ehlhalten.

Ehlhalten was also the name of a settlement in the municipal forest near a source. It was burned down however by soldiers and destroyed completely. In 2004 Ehlhalten competed in the final of the series Dolles Dorf on HR television, winning a third prize in this show about villages in Hesse.

== Mayors ==
- Ralf Wolter, 2000–2009
- Peter Reus (independent), 2009–2013
- Alexander Simon, 2013–present

== Economy ==
=== Transport ===
Eppstein station is on the Main-Lahn Railway and is served by line S2 of the Rhine-Main S-Bahn, running between Niedernhausen and Dietzenbach via Frankfurt and the town is around 3 km (1.9 mi) from the A3 Autobahn. Bundesstraße 455 passes through the town.

=== Local industry ===
The Stanniolfabrik Eppstein is in the central part Eppstein, beneath the castle. They are manufacturing tin foil and similar metal foils for highly specialised applications. It has become famous due to an appearance in the television series MythBusters, because they supplied lead foil for the lead ballon myth. RUCO printing inks (A. M. Ramp & Co GmbH) also has a facility here.

== Education ==
Eppstein has two primary schools and one comprehensive school. In addition, the former Sparkassenakademie (transl. bank academy) of Hessen-Thüringen is located here. The Eppstein-Rossert music school and the Eppstein music society offer instruction in various musical instruments.

=== Primary schools ===
In the district of Vockenhausen, near the training and sports centre at the Bienroth, is the Burg-Schule (lit. 'castle school'). It is somewhat larger with approx. 300 pupils than the Commenius-Schule, which is the primary school for pupils from the districts of Bremthal and Niederjosbach.

=== Freiherr-vom-Stein-Gesamtschule ===
The Gesamtschule ('comprehensive school') Freiherr-vom-Stein-Gesamtschule is located at the sports and school centre "Am Bienroth", Five-hundred and sixty students in the fifth to tenth years attend the school, which is divided into three sections: Hauptschule (years 5–9), Realschule and Gymnasium (both years 5–10). The school has an annual exchange of students with Eppstein's twinned town of Kenilworth, England, as well as a school in Tours, France. Every two years the school also hosts an exchange with the Bornova Anadolu Lisesi in İzmir, Turkey.

The school is known for a school shooting. On 3 June 1983, a man fatally shot three children, one teacher and a police officer dead and injured another 14 people, before then killing himself.

== Town partnerships ==
Eppstein is twinned with four towns:

- Aizkraukle, Latvia since 1998
- Kenilworth, England since 1994
- Langeais, France since 1986
- Schwarza, Thuringia, Germany

== Buildings ==
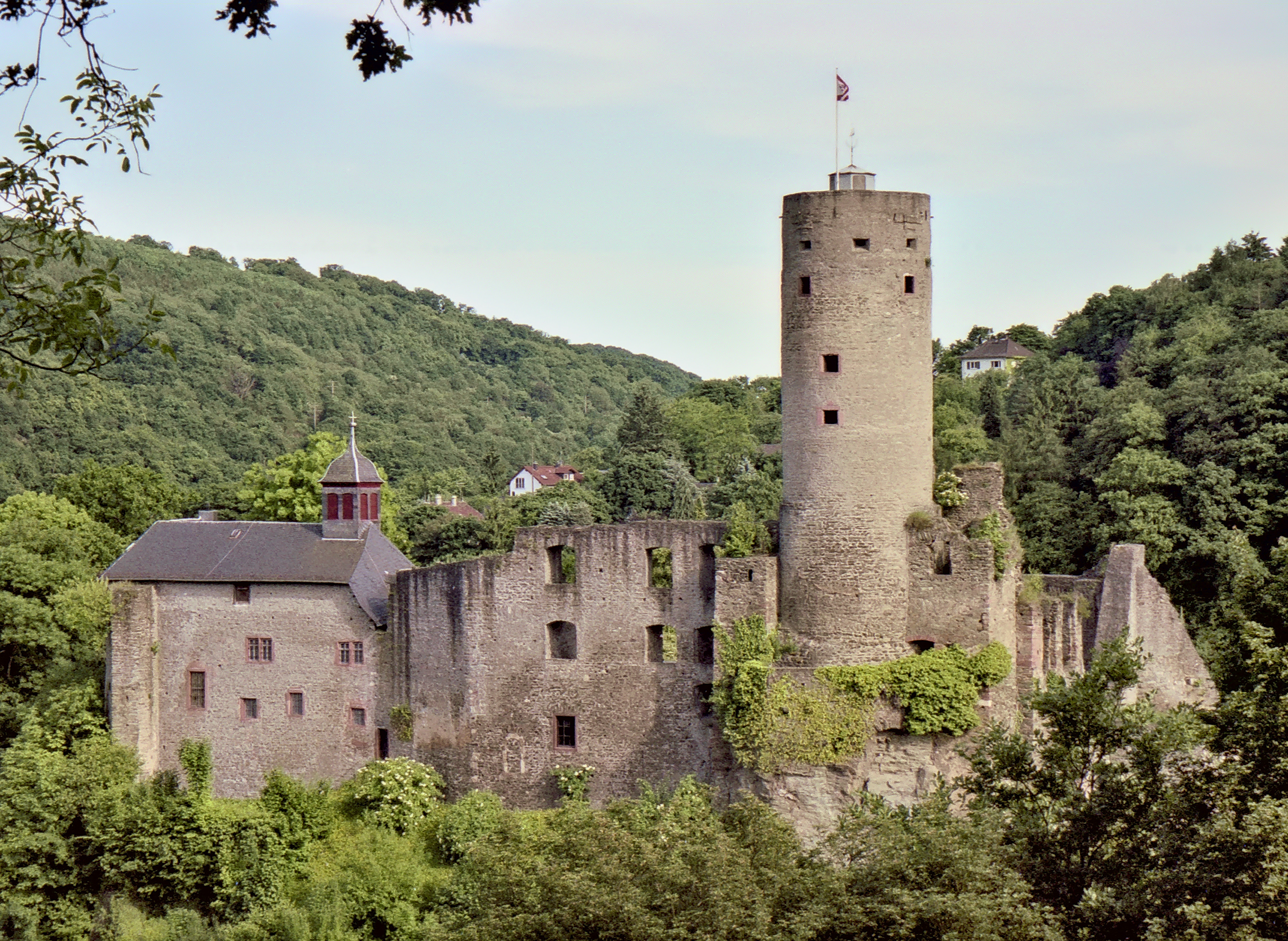
Ruins of Eppstein castle. View from north-western direction

The ruins of the Eppstein castle, first mentioned as "Ebbensten" in 1122, is in the old city centre of Eppstein. The museum in the castle is housed in the single building within the castle walls which was spared breakup in the early 19th century.

The museum contains baroque altar in the back, which Eppstein's Catholics acquired when they used the building as their chapel after the Talkirche Eppstein (lit. 'Eppstein valley church'), which today accommodates the evangelical parish, became Protestant during the European Reformation. Upstairs are some books written by early travel writers who refer to Eppstein, including a copy of Le chateau d'Eppstein by Alexandre Dumas, as well as paintings of the castle, some painted by members of one of the first painters' colonies in Germany—the Kronberger Malerkolonie.

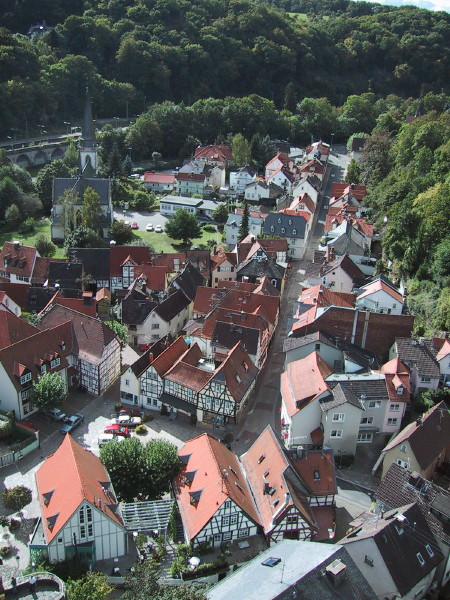
Eppstein's half-timbered buildings as seen from the castle tower

Eppstein station (Bahnhof Eppstein), built in 1903, houses a Rhein-Main-Verkehrsverbund (RMV) counter, the Bürgerbüro (lit. 'citizens office'), as well as a restaurant and café.

The Bergpark Villa Anna, on a hill overlooking the train station, was built by the wealthy Frankfurt businessman Alfred von Neufville around 1884. Its grounds were designed Andreas Weber, who also designed the park ground of Frankfurt Zoo. With 200 exotic trees and bushes, Bergpark Eppstein is one of two Bergparks (lit. 'mountain parks') in Hesse.

The Neufville Tower was built by the Neufvilles to house their private art collection, and to serve as their Jagdhaus ('hunting lodge').

Eppstein's beautification society keeps up a number of scenic overlooks, most of them built over a century ago during the flowering of Eppstein as a Luftkurort (lit. 'air spa town').

The "Pionier-Tempel," an iron structure, earlier nicknamed the "omnibus" or "tram temple," is a five-minute walk from the train station. It was built in 1889 by the 2nd company of the "pionier" (engineer) battalion XI from Mainz-Kastel. In four days, 500 men cut the forest path between the Eppstein train station and Wildsachsen for the transport of timber. When they finished, in keeping with the late 18th-century English tradition of landscape gardens dotted by gazebos and observation points, they built the scenic overlook.

The Kaisertempel with its Doric columns was built in 1894 as a memorial to commemorate the Prussian victory in the Franco-Prussian War (1870–1971), which unified the German Empire under King Wilhelm I of Prussia. The temple provides an aerial view of Eppstein.

== Meetings ==
Rund um den Henninger-Turm (lit. 'around the Henninger tower'), an annual bicycle race held on the first of May each year, runs through Eppstein.

Since 2003 the Taunus Trails mountain bike marathon, open to everyone, takes place each summer.

Regular events at the castle include the Burgfestspiele (lit. 'castle festival') in summer. In the inner court of the castle, drama groups present classic works as well as new productions. Another notable highlight is the Saxdays.

== Notable people from Eppstein ==
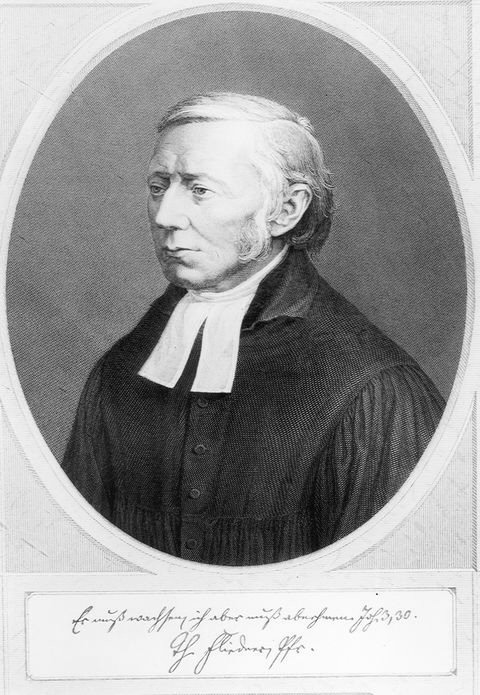
Pastor Theodor Fliedner

- Johann Adam Freiherr von Ickstatt (1702–1776), director of the University of Ingolstadt,
- Theodor Fliedner (1800–1864), pastor and innovator of the apostolic deacon's office.
- Alfred Bickel (1918–1999), Swiss football player and coach.
- Andreas Paulus (born 1968), international lawyer and judge of the Bundesverfassungsgericht.
- Felix Mendelssohn Bartholdy (1809–1847), musician (he liked hiking there, but never lived there)
- Robert Michel (1897–1983), typographer, graphic artist and testpilot
- Ella Bergmann-Michel (1895–1971), painter, photographer and documentary filmmaker
