= Sulzbach, Hesse =

Sulzbach
- Municipality
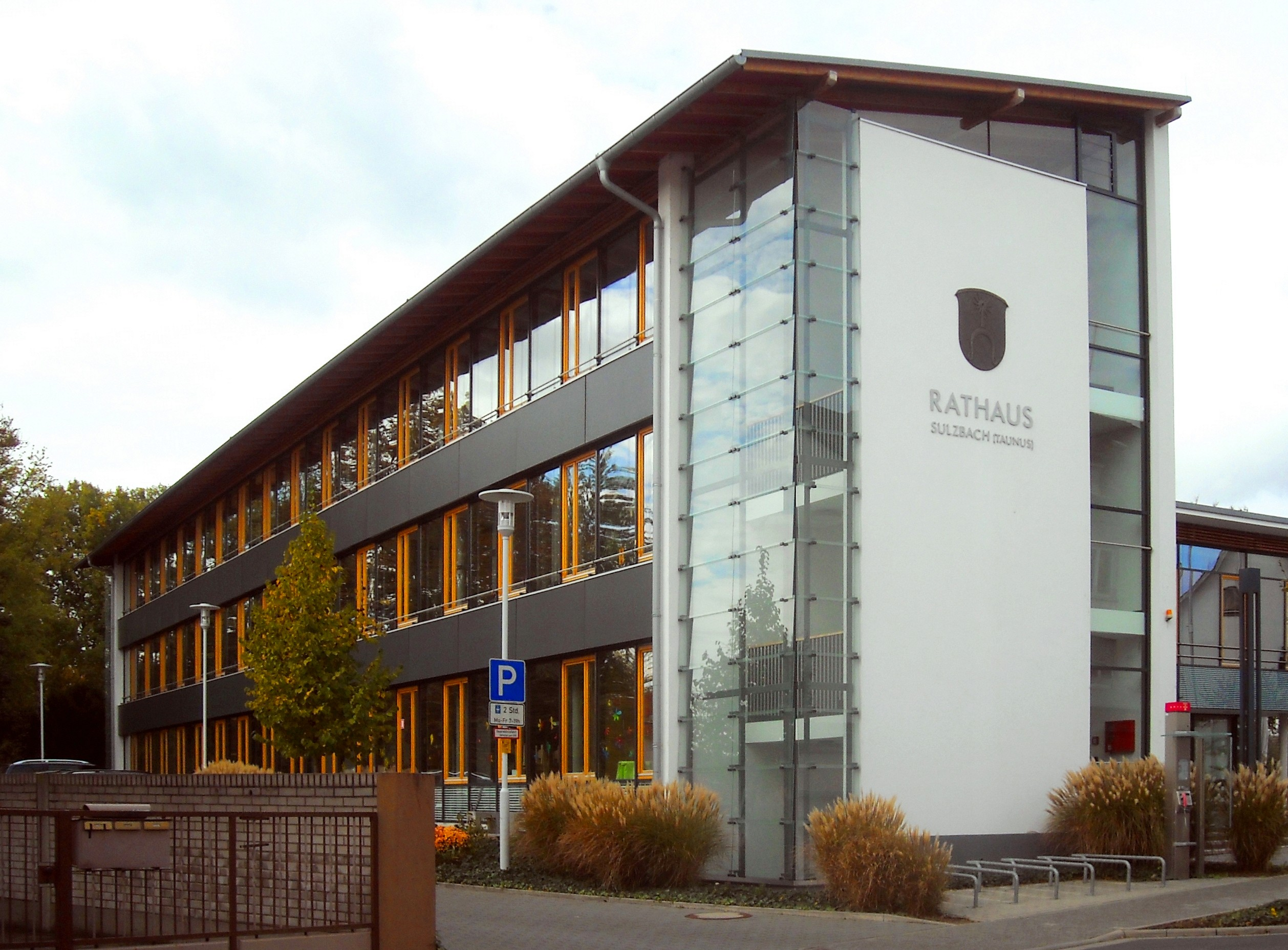
- Town hall

- Coat of arms

- Location of Sulzbach within Main-Taunus-Kreis district
- Interactive map of Sulzbach
- Location within Germany Location within Hesse
- Coordinates: 50°08′N 08°32′E
- Country: Germany
- State: Hesse
- Admin. region: Darmstadt
- District: Main-Taunus-Kreis

Government
  - Mayor (2021–27): Elmar Bociek (CDU)

Area
  - Total: 7.85 km^{2} (3.03 sq mi)
- Elevation: 135 m (443 ft)

Population (2025-12-31)
  - Total: 8,740
  - Density: 1,110/km^{2} (2,880/sq mi)
- Time zone: UTC+01:00 (CET)
  - Summer (DST): UTC+02:00 (CEST)
- Postal codes: 65843
- Dialling codes: 06196
- Vehicle registration: MTK
- Website: www.sulzbach-taunus.de

Sulzbach (German pronunciation: [ˈzʊltsbax]) is a municipality in the Main-Taunus district, in Hesse, Germany and part of the Frankfurt Rhein-Main urban area.

== History ==
Sulzbach is first referred to in 1035. It was one of only a few Holy Roman Empire Imperial Villages and one of the five final ones when the Holy Roman Empire was dissolved in 1806.

Physician Philipp Jakob Cretzschmar (1786–1845) was born in Sulzbach.

== Twin towns – sister cities ==
Sulzbach is twinned with:

- Pont-Sainte-Maxence, France, since 1982
- Jablonec nad Jizerou, Czech Republic, since 1987
- Schönheide, Germany, since 1990

== Points of interest ==
- Arboretum Main-Taunus
