= Eppstein station =

Railway station in Eppstein, Germany

Eppstein
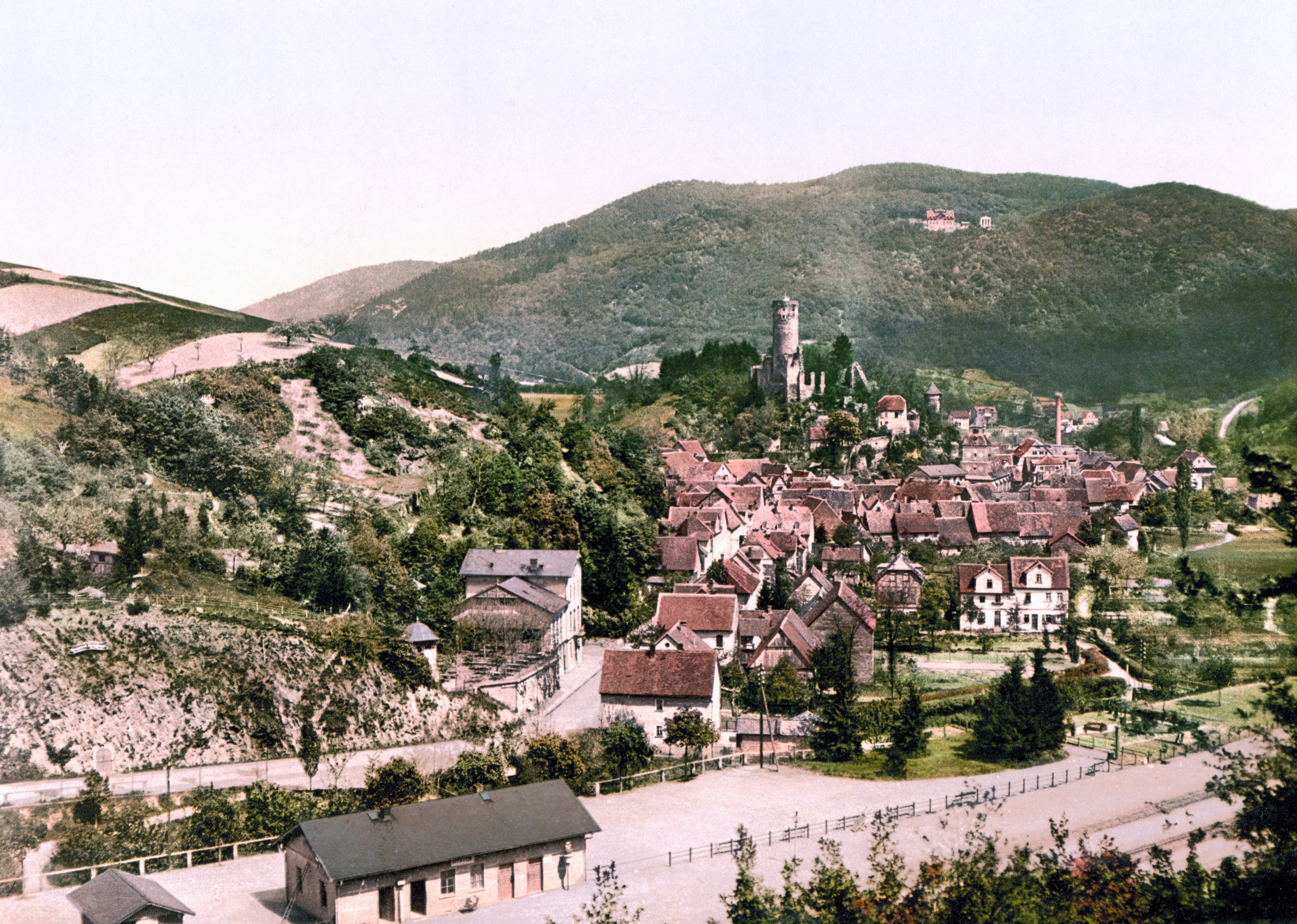
- Station area at the bottom with first entrance building (photochrom between 1890 and 1905)

General information
- Location: Am Stadtbahnhof 1 Eppstein, Hesse; Germany
- Coordinates: 50°08′23″N 8°23′17″E
- Lines: Main-Lahn Railway (KBS 627/645.2)
- Platforms: 2

Construction
- Accessible: Yes

Other information
- Station code: 1616
- DS100 code: FEP
- IBNR: 8001815
- Category: 4
- Fare zone: : 6620
- Website: www.bahnhof.de

History
- Opened: 15 October 1877

Services
Preceding station	Rhine-Main S-Bahn	Following station
Bremthal towards Niedernhausen	S2 (Rhine-Main S-Bahn)	Lorsbach towards Dietzenbach
Location

Eppstein station is a station in the town of Eppstein in the German state of Hesse. The station opened during the construction of the Main-Lahn Railway (German: Main-Lahn-Bahn) by the Hessian Ludwig Railway (Hessische Ludwigsbahn), initially with a temporary entrance building. The line was opened over its whole length on 15 October 1877. It is classified by Deutsche Bahn as a category 4 station, and is served by line S2 of the Rhine-Main S-Bahn.

== Rail tracks ==
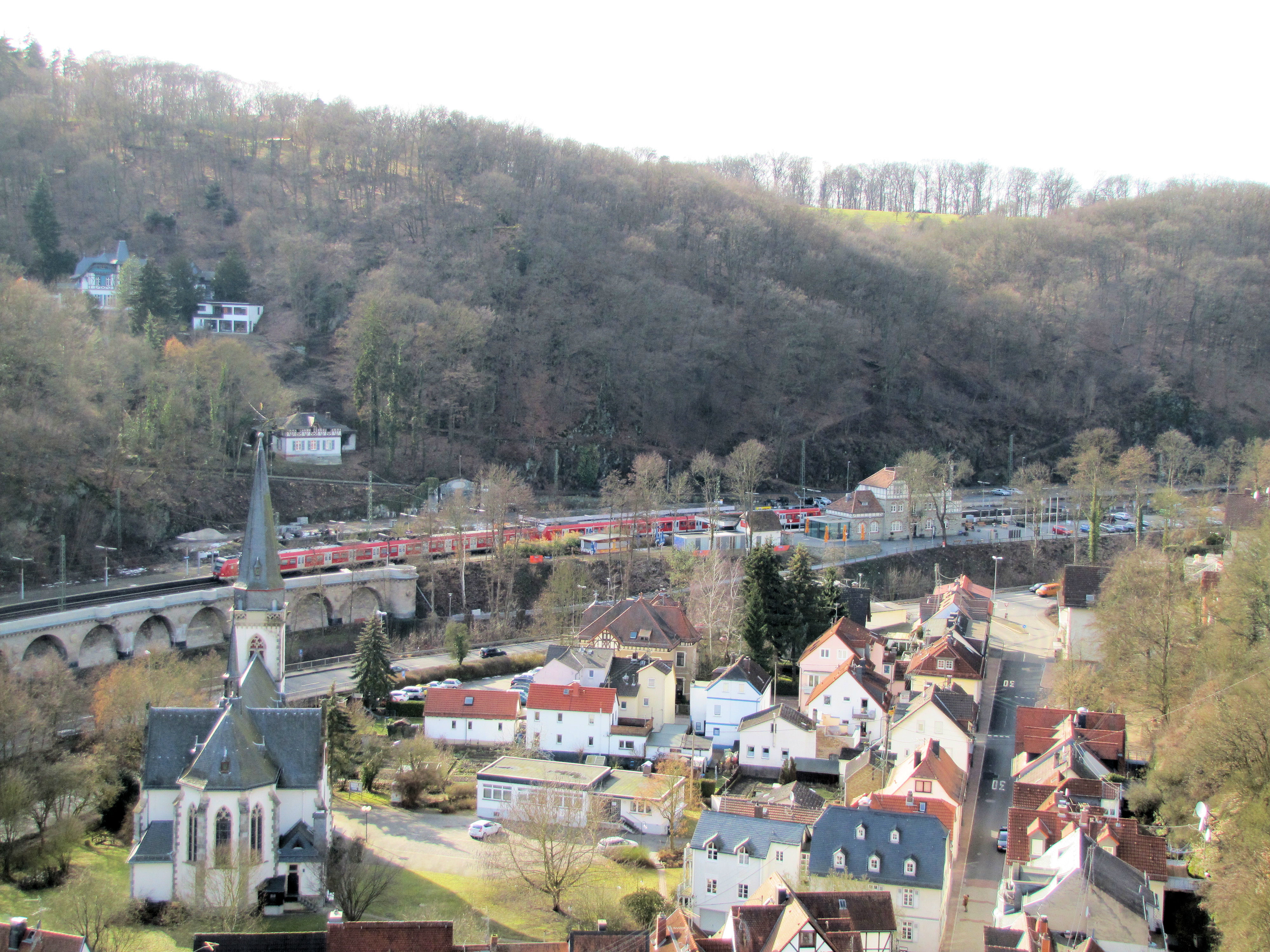
View of the station over the town

The line is located in the narrow Lorsbach valley and the resulting topographical limits, set in particular by the Eppstein tunnel, meant that the station was located on the opposite side of the Schwarzbach from the town of Eppstein and had to be connected by a bridge. In fact, the Schwarzbach stream had to be relocated to allow the building of the station.

The originally single-track line had a passing loop in the station area and sidings for the parking of rolling stock. The southern track in the station area served freight.

The line was prepared from the outset for a second track, but this was delayed until 1914. This required an expansion of the station area: south of the two main tracks two passing tracks were installed. In addition to the “home” platform (next to the station building) there is now in another island platform with two platform edges. The southern freight track traffic was also redesigned and a new freight hall was built; this was torn down as part of the current construction of a new Eppstein tunnel.

In preparation for the opening of the S-Bahn to Niedernhausen the line was electrified and the station area of Eppstein was redeveloped. The building of the new Eppstein tunnel involves changes, including the relocation of the tracks a bit further north than previously and the building of two new platforms and the demolition of the old platforms.

== Entrance building ==
The original Eppstein station had a temporary, single-story entrance building. Added to this before 1885, was a dormitory building that was demolished in 1971 in preparation for the S-Bahn. In 1903, the temporary entrance building was completely replaced by a building in an historicist style. This building was abandoned in the 1990s; after it had been left largely empty for 10 years, it was taken over by an Eppstein municipal corporation and renovated in 2005. Today it is used for a "mobility centre", a government shopfront and a restaurant.

The station building, freight shed and the impressive retaining wall of the embankment are or were monuments under the Hessian Heritage Act.
