= Esslingen railbus =

Esslingen Railbus, 1st series
- Drawing of Esslinger railcar (1st series 1951–1957)
- Manufacturer: Maschinenfabrik Esslingen
- Constructed: 1951–1957

Specifications
- Car length: 23,530 mm (77 ft 2 3/8 in) over buffers
- Maximum speed: 80 km/h (50 mph)
- Weight: 32.0–38.0 t (31.5–37.4 long tons; 35.3–41.9 short tons) empty
- Prime mover(s): Deutz A8L614; Deutz A12L714; MAN W6V15/18A; Büssing U10; Büssing U11 D
- Power output: 2×145 PS (107 kW; 143 hp); 2x150 PS (110 kW; 150 hp); 2×210 PS (150 kW; 210 hp); 2×220 PS (160 kW; 220 hp)
- UIC classification: (1A)′(A1)′ or B′2′
- Track gauge: 1,435 mm (4 ft 8 1/2 in)

Esslingen Railbus, 2nd series
- Manufacturer: Maschinenfabrik Esslingen
- Constructed: 1958–1961

Specifications
- Car length: 25,030 mm (82 ft 1 3/8 in) over buffers
- Maximum speed: 85 km/h (53 mph)
- Weight: 37.5 t (36.9 long tons; 41.3 short tons) empty
- Prime mover(s): Deutz A12L714; Deutz BA12L714; Deutz F8L413; Daimler Benz OM 407h
- Power output: 2×190 PS (140 kW; 190 hp); 2x220 PS (160 kW; 220 hp); 2×227 PS (167 kW; 224 hp); 2×270 PS (200 kW; 270 hp)
- UIC classification: B′B′
- Track gauge: 1,435 mm (4 ft 8 1/2 in)

The Esslingen railbus (German: Esslinger Triebwagen) is a diesel railbus first delivered in 1951 for private railways (Nichtbundeseigene Eisenbahn) in Germany.

== History ==
The Esslingen railbus, sometimes shortened in German to Esslinger, had been developed during the 1950s by the Maschinenfabrik Esslingen for small branch lines and private railways. Fifty examples were built in three variants: power coaches (Triebwagen) or VT, trailer coaches (Beiwagen) or VB and driving coaches (Steuerwagen) or VS.

Of the first series, 25 VT, 6 VB and 4 VS were delivered into service, of the second series (from 1959) 6 VT, 4 VB and 5 VS.

== Gallery ==
Esslingen railbuses belonging to various railways

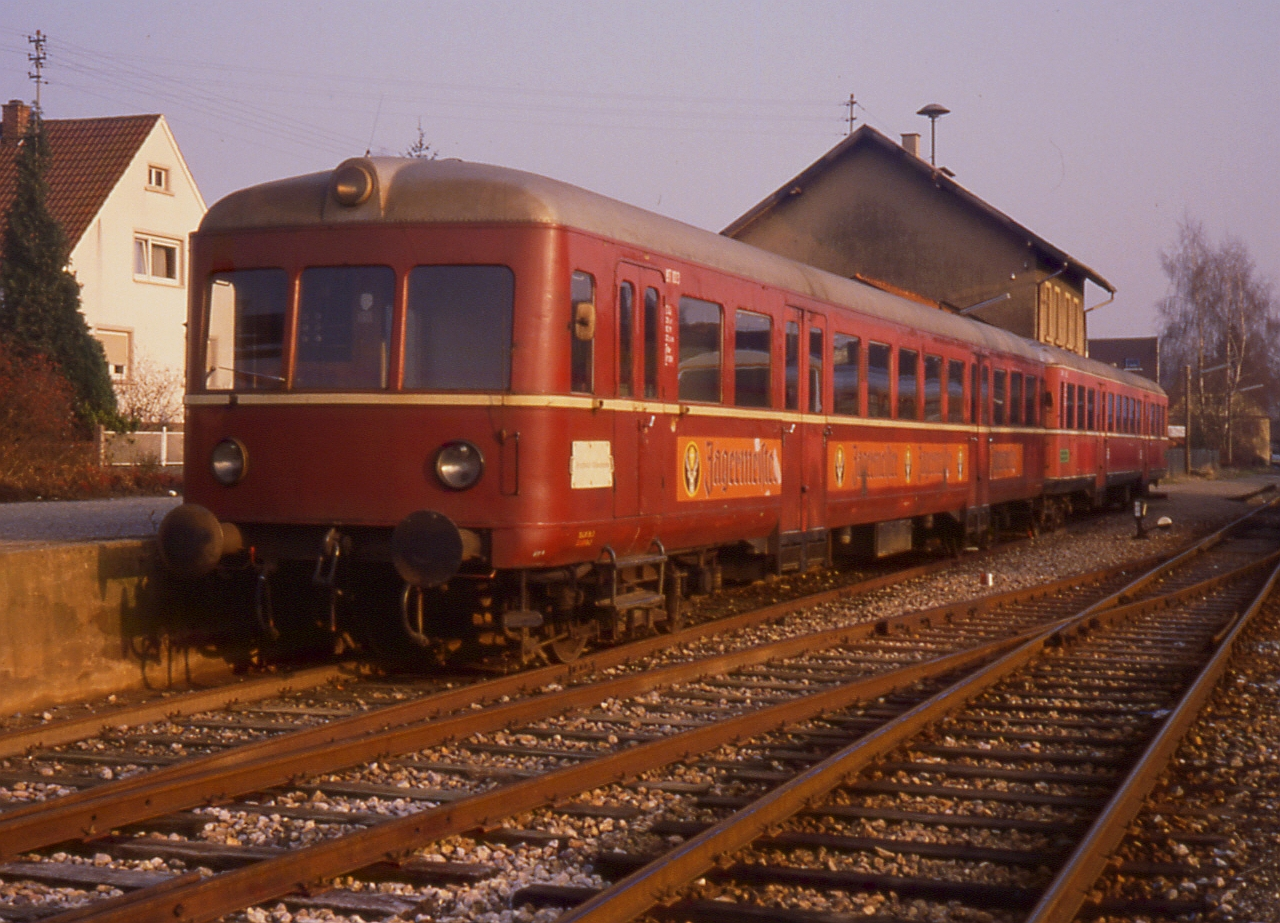
VT 103 of the SWEG at Odenheim station (1990)

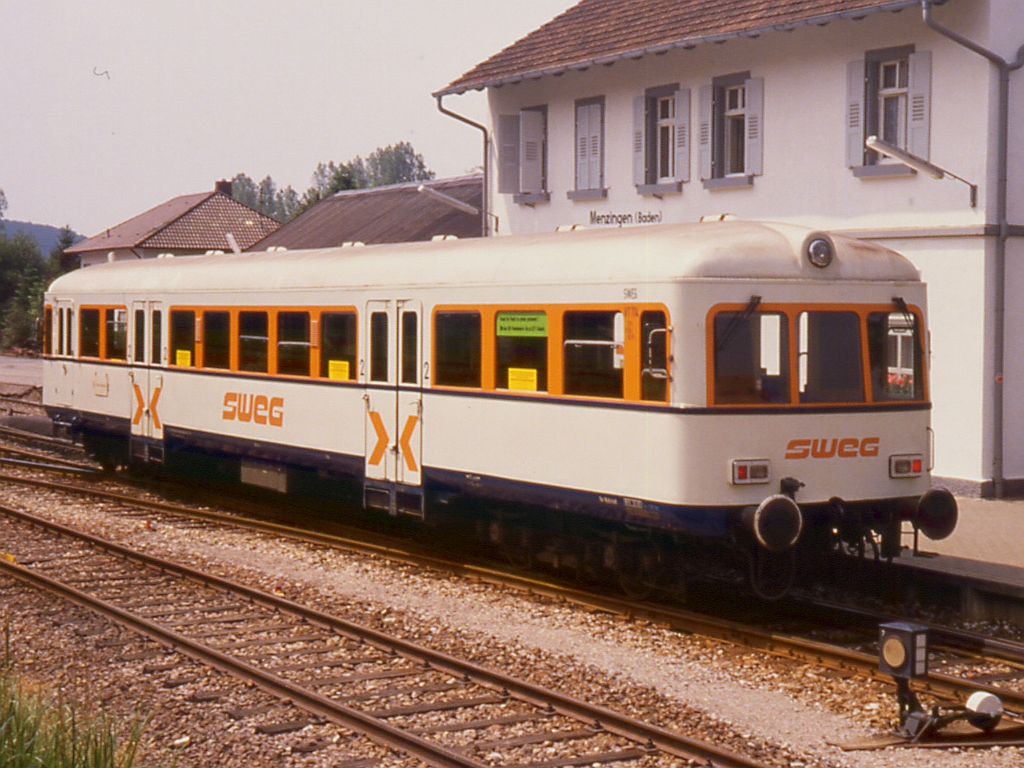
VT 114 of the SWEG at Menzingen station (1989)

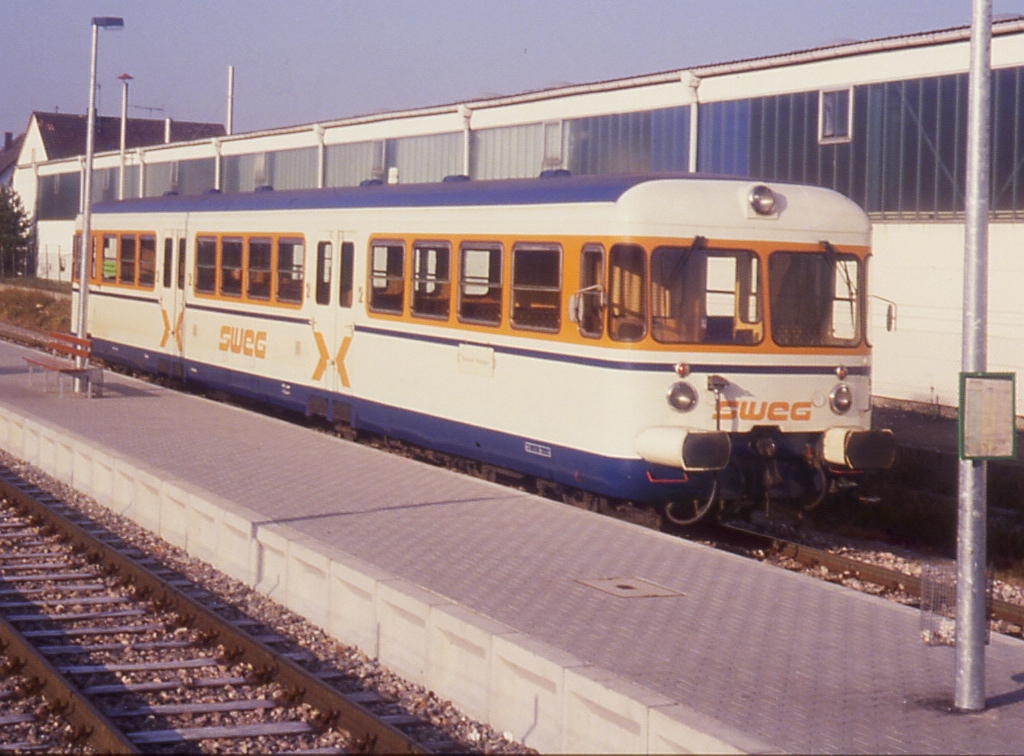
VT 112 of the SWEG at Münzesheim station (1992)

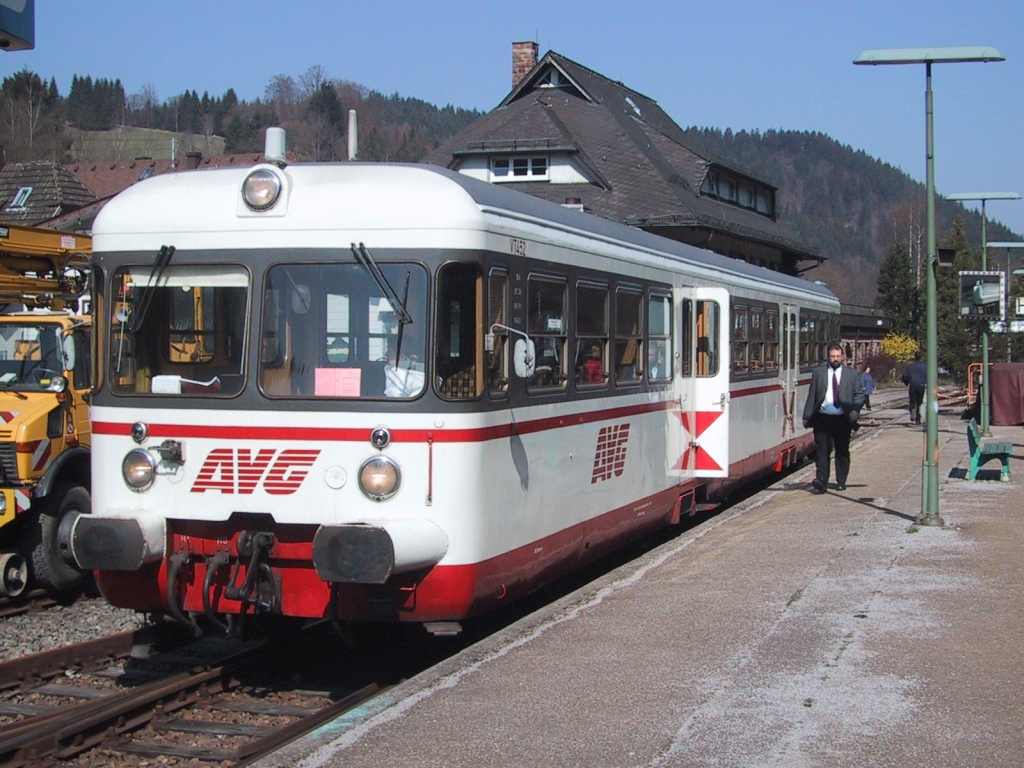
VT 452 of the AVG on the Murg Valley Railway (2002)

== Sources ==
- Thomas Estler: Esslinger Triebwagen. Transpress Verlag, Stuttgart 2002, ISBN 3-613-71182-6
