= Liederbach am Taunus =

- Municipality
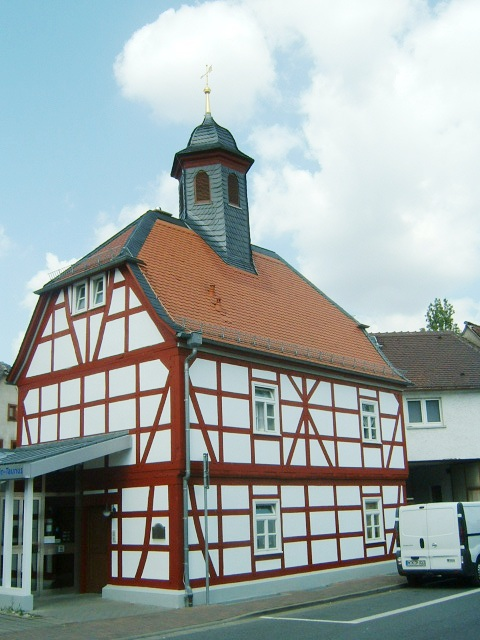
- Old town hall

- Coat of arms

- Location of Liederbach am Taunus within Main-Taunus-Kreis district
- Interactive map of Liederbach am Taunus
- Location within Germany Location within Hesse
- Coordinates: 50°07′N 08°30′E
- Country: Germany
- State: Hesse
- Admin. region: Darmstadt
- District: Main-Taunus-Kreis

Government
  - Mayor (2021–27): Eva Söllner (CDU)

Area
  - Total: 6.2 km^{2} (2.4 sq mi)
- Elevation: 120–185 m (394–607 ft)

Population (2025-12-31)
  - Total: 8,843
  - Density: 1,400/km^{2} (3,700/sq mi)
- Time zone: UTC+01:00 (CET)
  - Summer (DST): UTC+02:00 (CEST)
- Postal codes: 65835
- Dialling codes: 06196 und 069
- Vehicle registration: MTK
- Website: https://www.liederbach.eu/

Liederbach am Taunus (German pronunciation: [ˈliːdɐbax ʔam ˈtaʊnʊs], lit. 'Liederbach on the Taunus') is a town in Hesse, Germany with 8500 inhabitants. It is situated 20 kilometres (12 mi) west of downtown Frankfurt am Main.

== Twin towns ==
Liederbach is twinned to the following towns:

- Saldus in the Courland region of Latvia
- (United Kingdom) Verwood in Dorset, England.
- Villebon-sur-Yvette in the Essonne département of France
- (Germany) Frauenwald, Thuringia
- Pietrowice Wielkie, Poland

== Visual Impressions ==
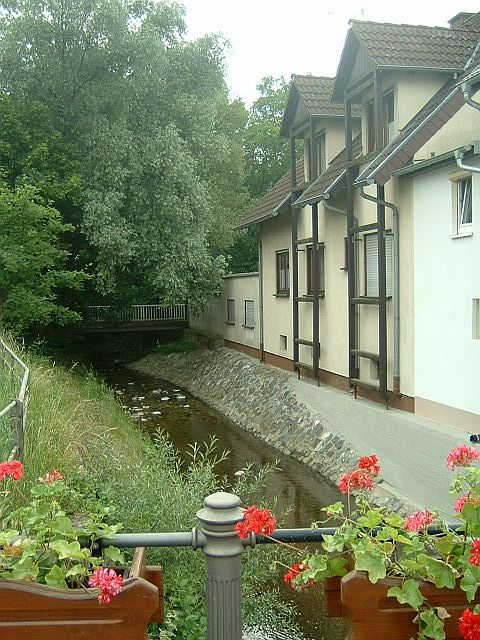
the name giving creek Liederbach

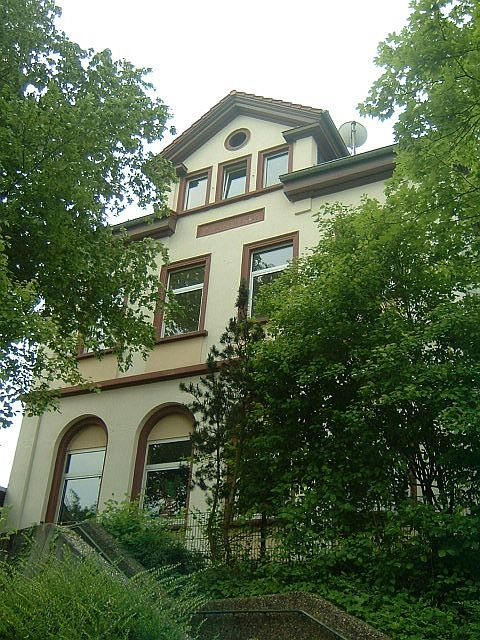
old school

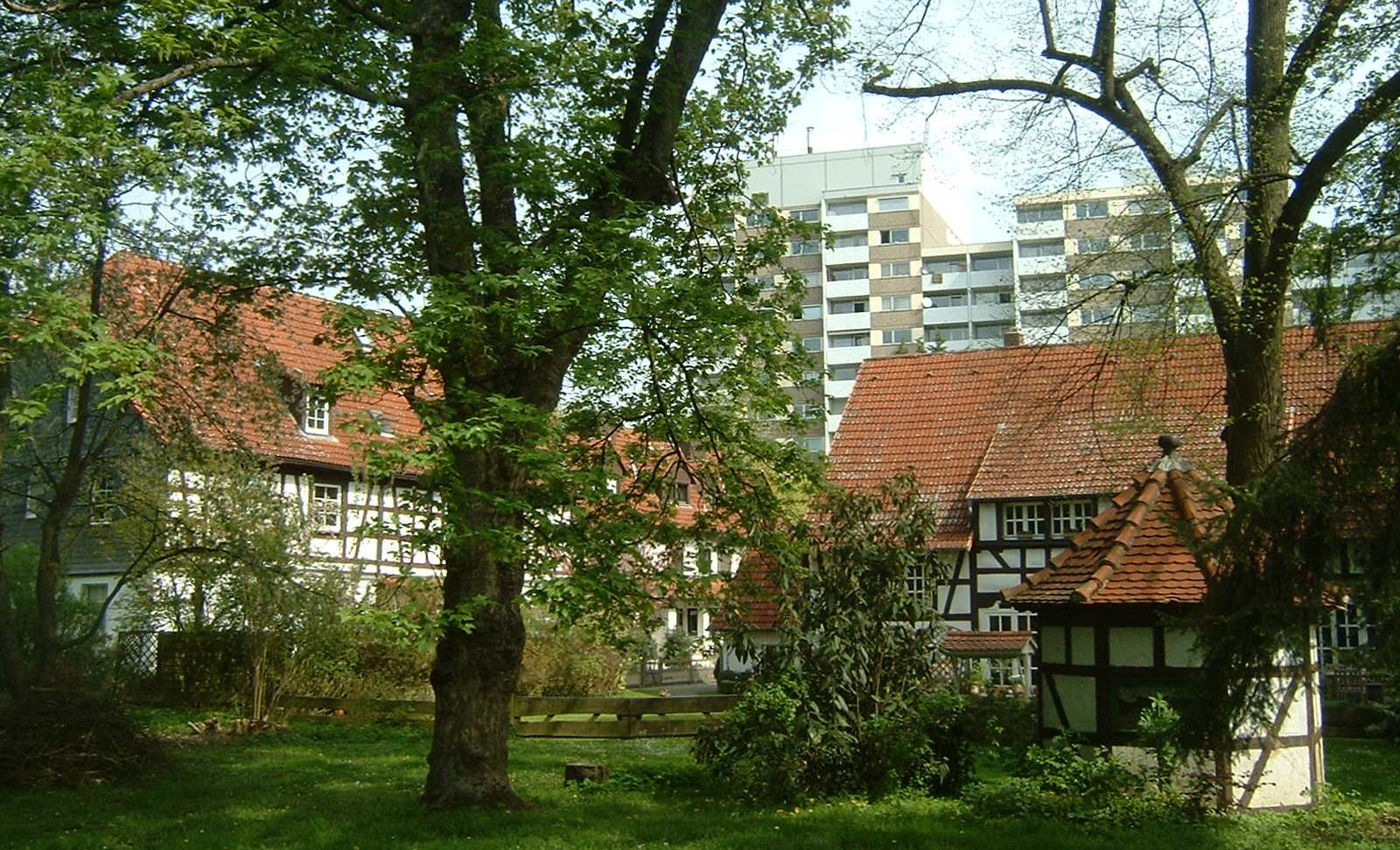
former mill, now apartment
