= Siegerland-Höhenring =

Hiking trail going through three German federal states

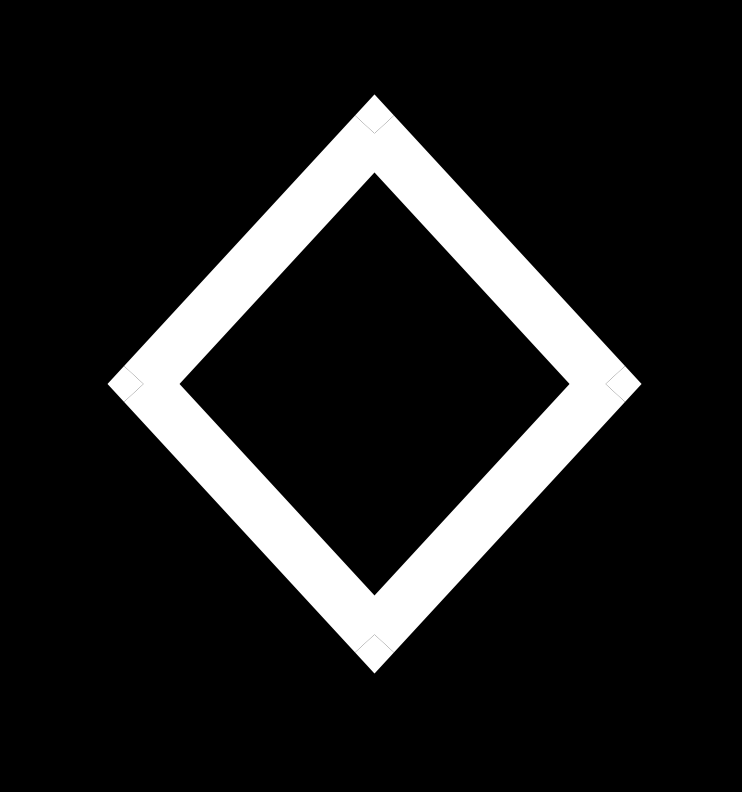
- SGV waymark upside down square marks the trail
- Length: 142 kilometres (88 mi) in 2022
- Location: Siegerland
- Designation: local circular trail
- Trailheads: Wolfshorn; Hoher Wald; Riemen; Pfaffenhain/Giller; Jagdberg; Hoher Wald; Kalteiche
- Use: Hiking, Mountainbiking, Nordic Walking
- Highest point: Jagdberg, 671 m (2,201 ft)
- Lowest point: Freusburger Mühle (Freusburg mill), 182 m (597 ft)
- Difficulty: medium
- Season: around the year
- Website: https://www.sgv-siegerland.de

Siegerland-Höhenring (Siegerland mountain ridge circular route) is an approximately 142-kilometre-long (88-mile-long) hiking trail in Germany that circles most parts of Siegerland in the districts of Siegen-Wittgenstein and Altenkirchen.

== Course ==
At the borders of the towns of Freudenberg, Kreuztal and Hilchenbach to the district of Olpe - and thus between the Siegerland and the Sauerland - the hiking trail runs not far from the Ruhr-Sieg watershed at the same time along the Landhecke, and then, described clockwise, from about the historical toll station Helberhauser Schlag to be continued north of the Ferndorf river spring along the Rhine-Weser watershed in a southerly direction and to Würgendorf-Wasserscheide along the same route as the Rothaarsteig. From its northernmost point at Welschen Ennest to Dornbruch/Dollenbruch north of Dahlbruch, the Siegerland-Höhenring is congruent with the Siegerlandweg. North of Hilchenbach-Lützel, the hiking trail passes the Giller, which belongs to Grund, with the Giller Tower and the Ginsberg heather. Between Lützel and Hainchen, the path that runs here along the Eisenstraße ("Iron road") then changes to the Sieg-Lahn watershed, essentially following it to the southern district area. Benfe and Großenbach are intermediate stations in Wittgenstein, an area and former district close to Siegerland. South and south-east of the source of the Lahn, the Siegerland-Höhenring and the Rothaarsteig run about a kilometer along the E1 European long distance path. From Wilgersdorf past the Haiger industrial area Kalteiche near Haigerseelbach, where it crosses the federal highway B 54, the Siegerland-Höhenring runs a few kilometers through the Hessian Lahn-Dill district to Würgendorf-Wasserscheide.

From Würgendorf-Wasserscheide, the path between Holzhausen and the main village of Burbach leads into the Burbach municipality and turns behind Burbach-Lützeln towards the Siegerland Airport. At its southernmost point in Lippe, it reunites with the E1 European long distance path, this time in the E1's opposite direction of travel, in order to run together with it, with two short interruptions, to Freusburg in a north-westerly direction and leads from Lippe after a sharp bend to the north-west, initially further across the state border to Rhineland-Palatinate in the direction of Herdorf, from where it goes past the Druidenstein and down to Freusburg. There it crosses the Sieg at its lowest point at the Freusburger Mühle. The path continues northwards and up again to Niederfischbach, then past Oberasdorf and Plittershagen to Friesenhagen. It crosses the state border between Rhineland-Palatinate and North Rhine-Westphalia twice in quick succession. Between Hünsborn and the Scheiderwald passage, the Wenden surrounding trail and the Siegerland-Höhenring mostly coincide, but sometimes run side by side in the same direction.

== Landmarks ==
The Siegerland-Höhenring passes under the Hüttentalstraße motorway (HTS) between Altenwenden and Bockenbach and also between Altenkleusheim and Krombach's bold beech under the HTS feeder road to the Krombach motorway access. In Burgholdinghausen, the route runs along the source of the Littfe, above Oberndorf at the source of the Ferndorf and south of the Siedlung Lützel (Lützel settlement), which belongs to Hilchenbach, not far from the sources of the Eder, Sieg, Lahn and Ilse, further along the Ochsenborn. In doing so, you will pass the highest mountain in the Siegerland "Riemen" some distance away and walk along the main ridge of the Rothaar Mountains. Gillerturm is a vantage point with sight distances of more than 60 kilometers (≈ 40 miles or more) in good weather, placed right on the Siegerland-Höhenring. The major regional event “KulturPur” takes place every spring on the neighboring Giller.

The hiking trail leads past Jagdberg in the immediate vicinity of the summit of the highest mountain in the Lahn-Dill district and the second highest mountain in Netphen town. After a few meters of the same route, the B 54 is crossed at the Kalteiche industrial area. Siegerland airport is passed north-east of Lippe.

Crottorf moated castle is the final resting place for the bones of the East Prussian journalist ("Die Zeit") Marion Countess Dönhoff.

Between Oberholzklau and Hünsborn, a historical Nassau customs station for importing goods from the Electorate of Cologne has been reconstructed with the border station Holzklauer Schlag. The Krombach district of Kreuztal is the seat of Krombacher Brauerei, named after the village, one of the biggest breweries in Germany. Near Littfeld, Kruberg and Neuenkleusheim the way passes Ewiger Fuhrmann wind generator, which was the highest in the world when built in 2000.

== Villages along the trail ==
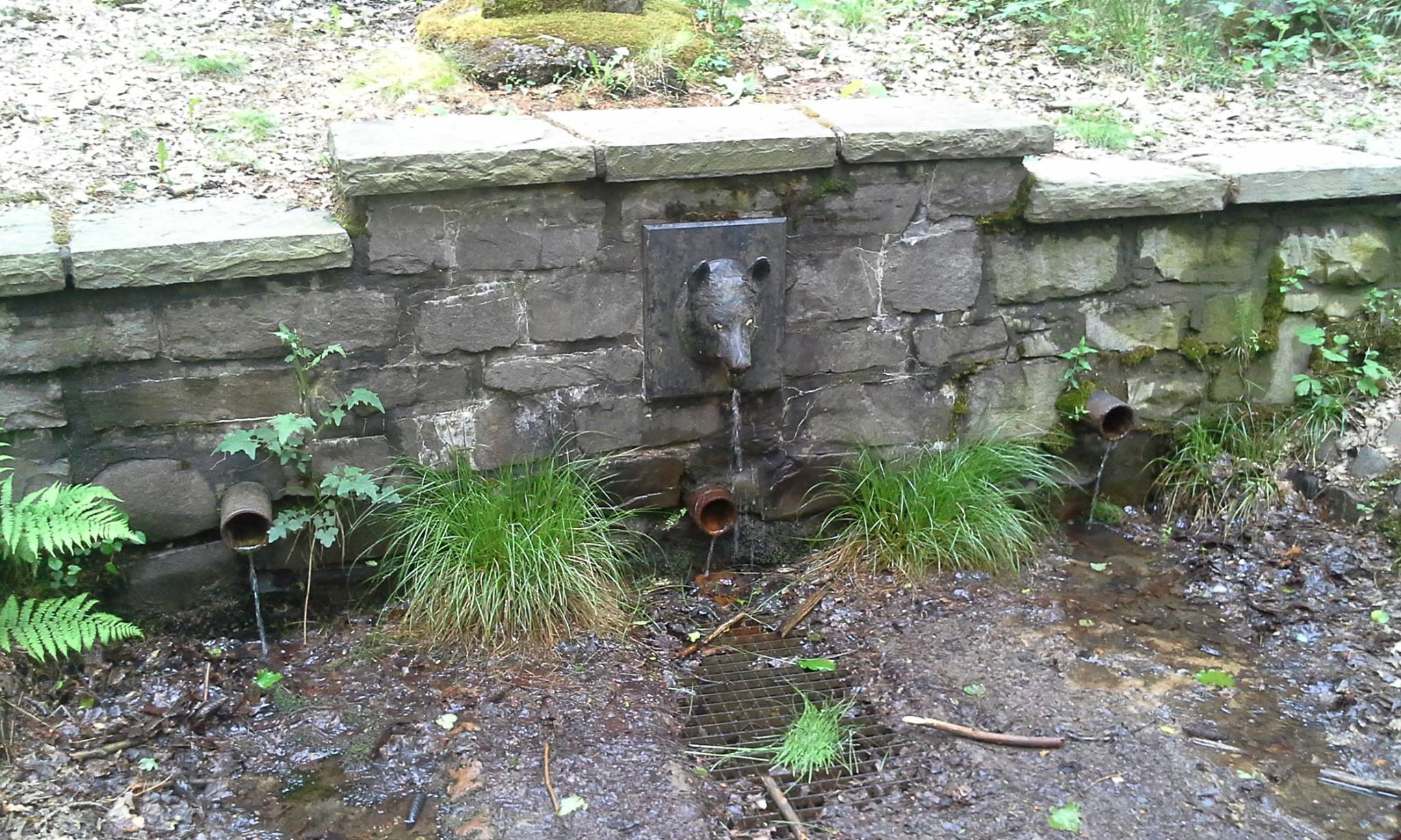
Littfe source at Burgholdinghausen

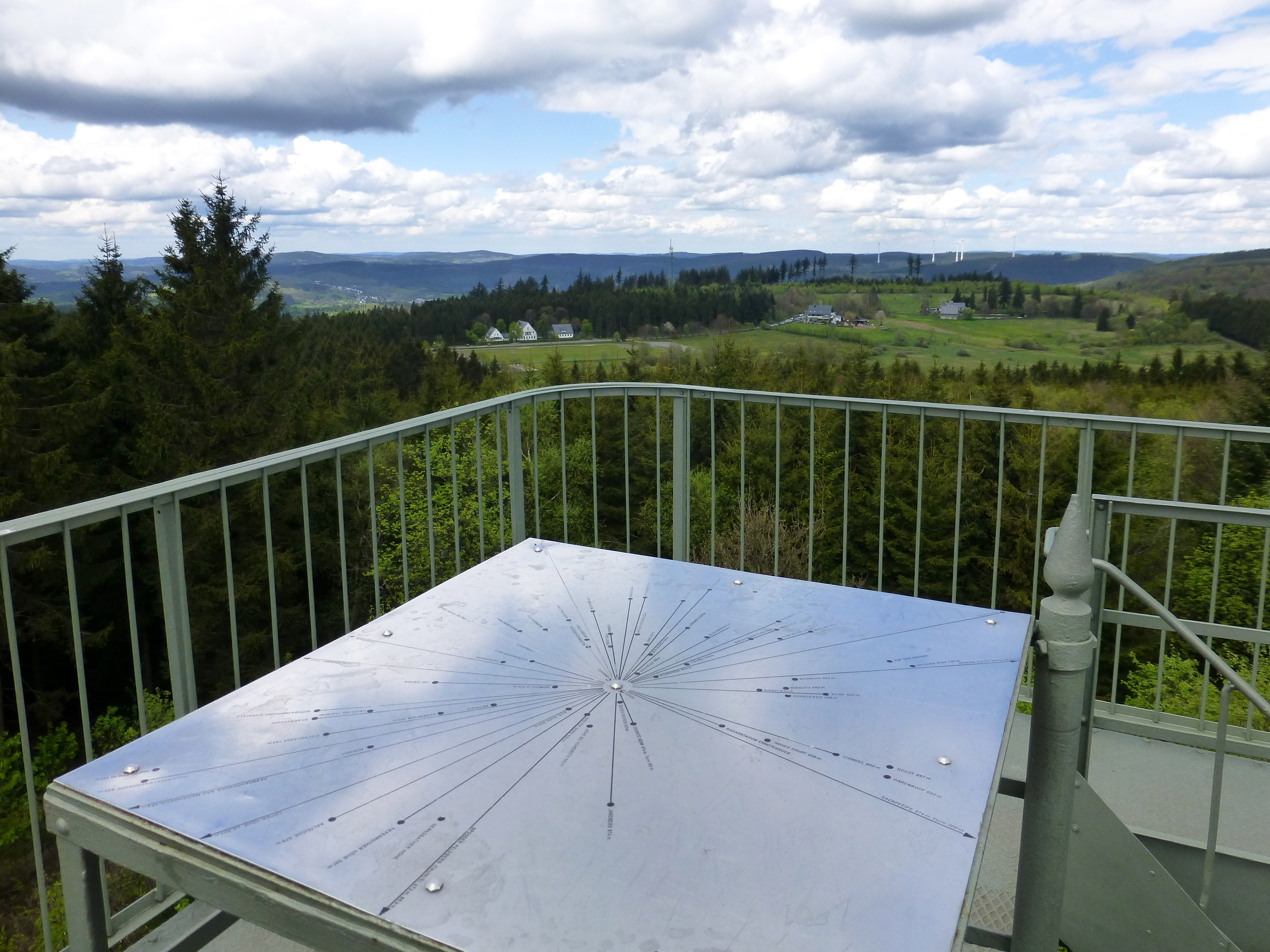
Giller tower at Grund

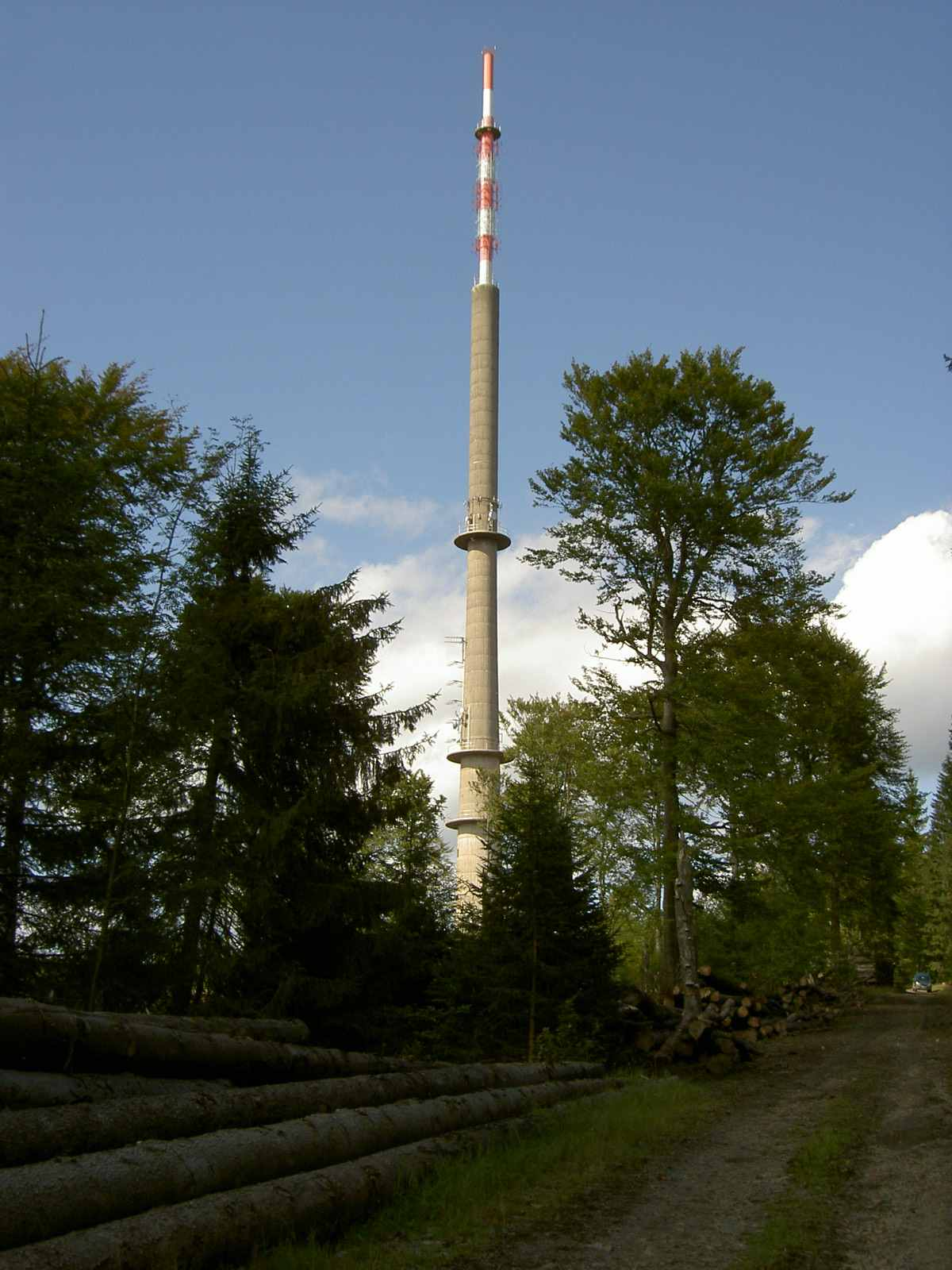
Ederkopf

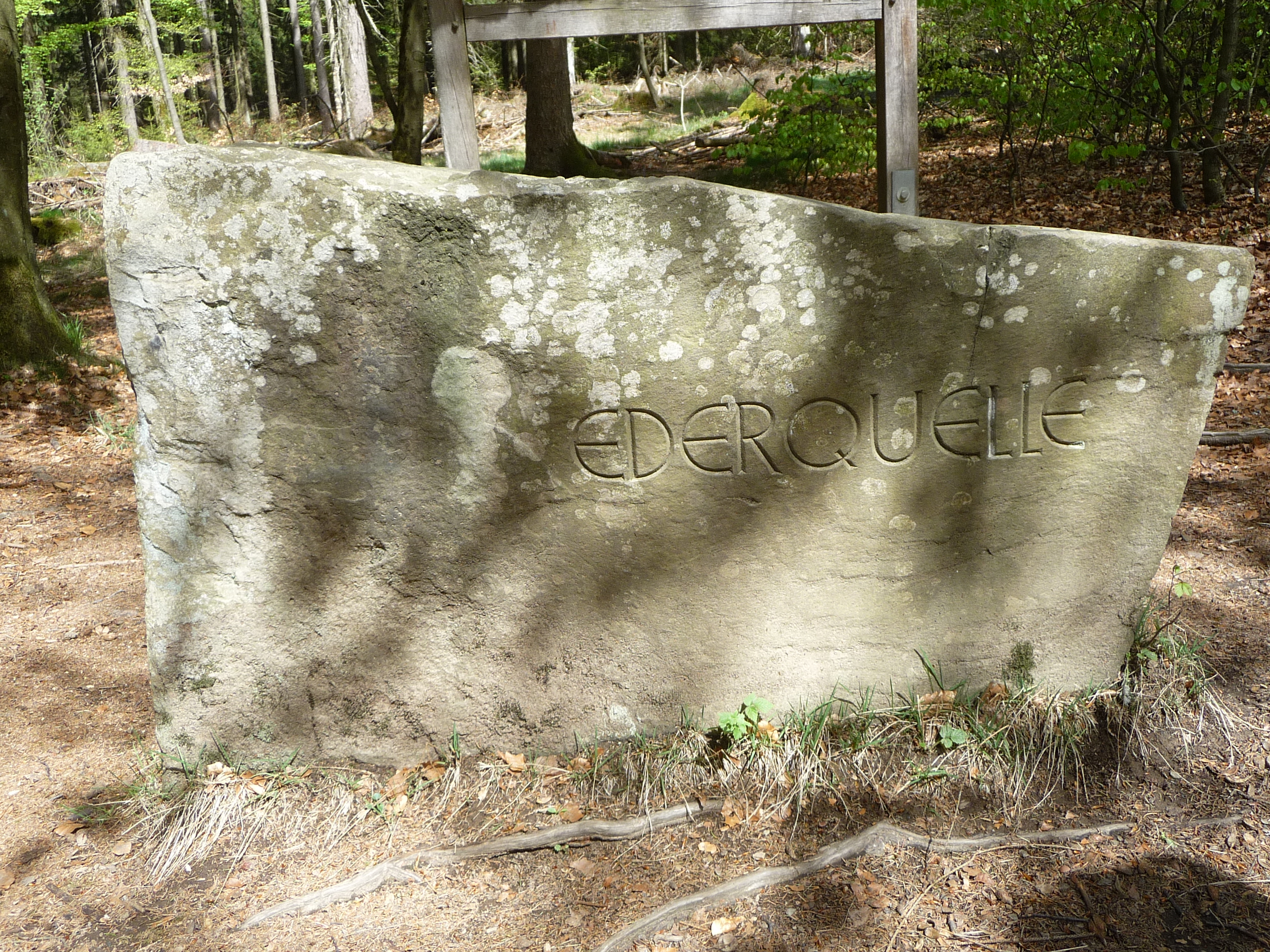
Eder source

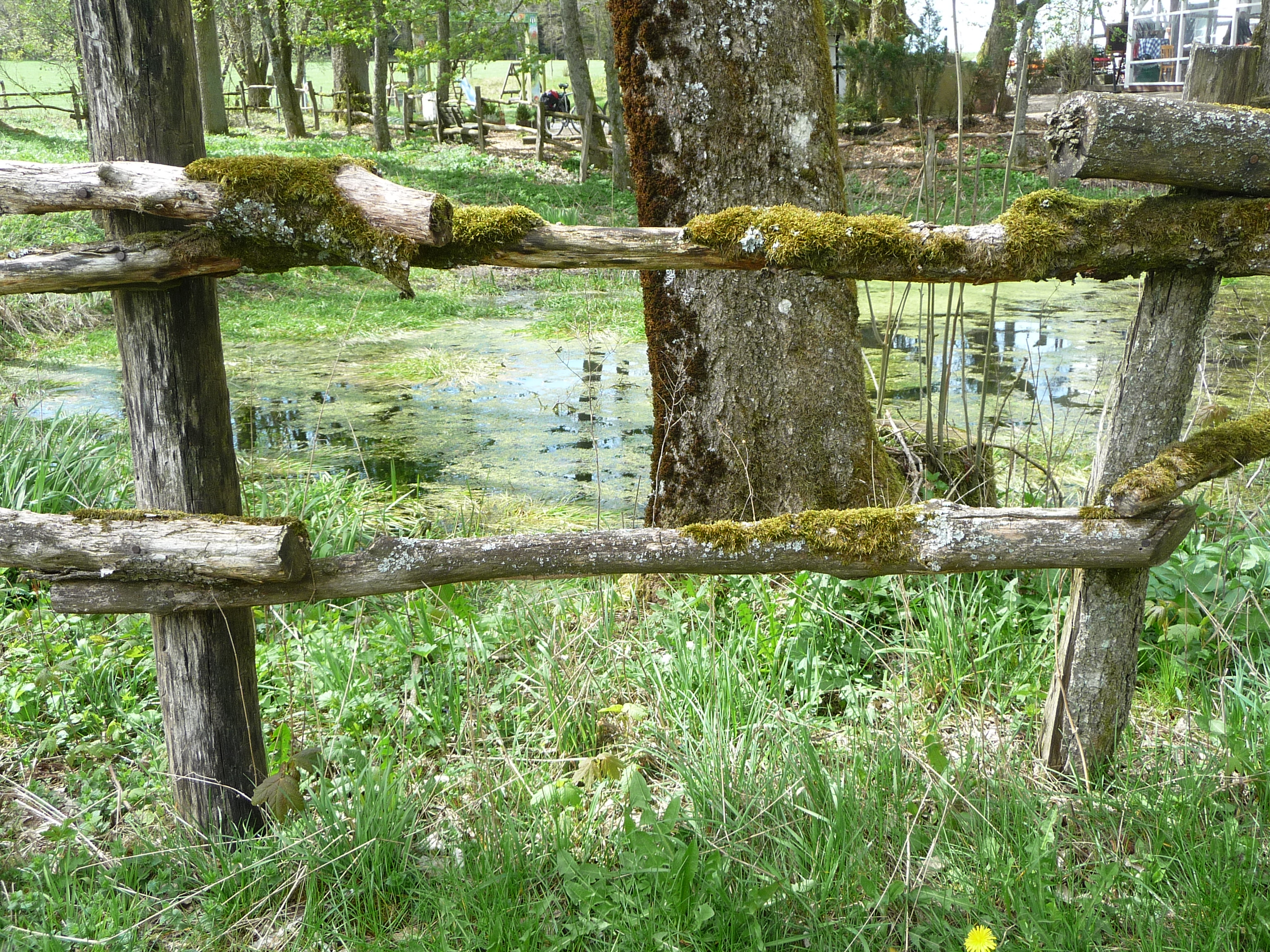
Lahn source at Eisenstraße

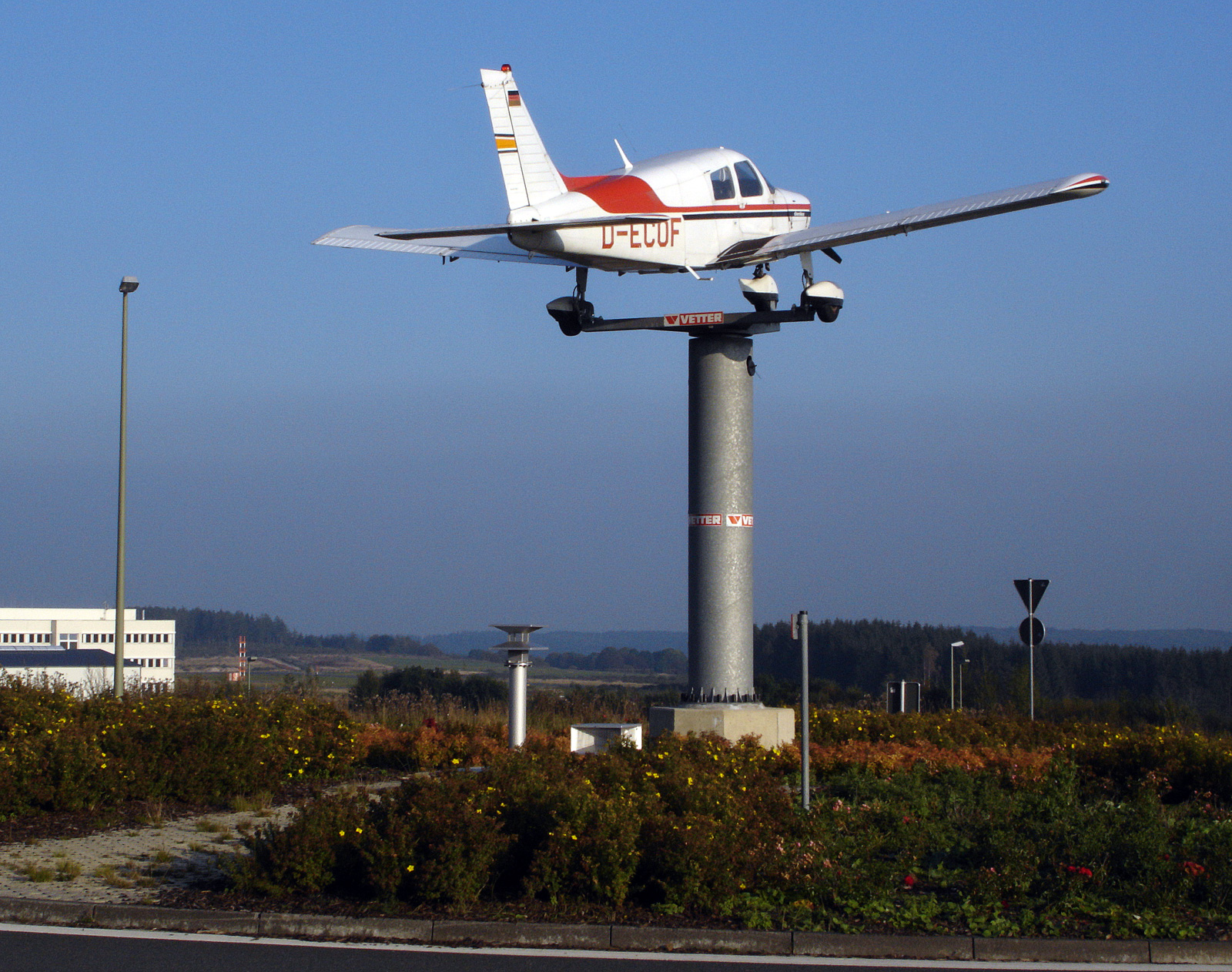
Siegerland Airport, one of Germany's highest airports

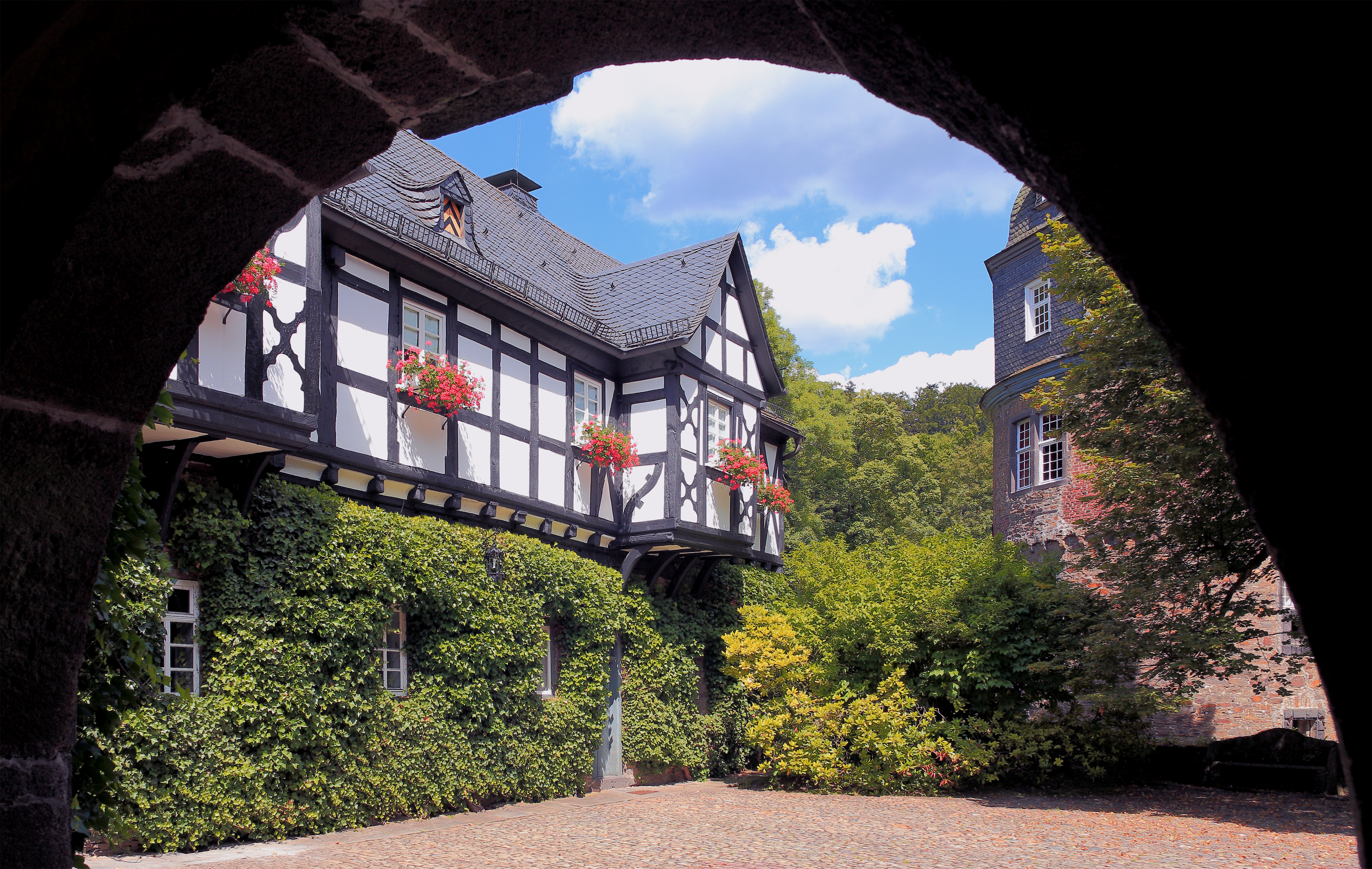
Crottorf castle

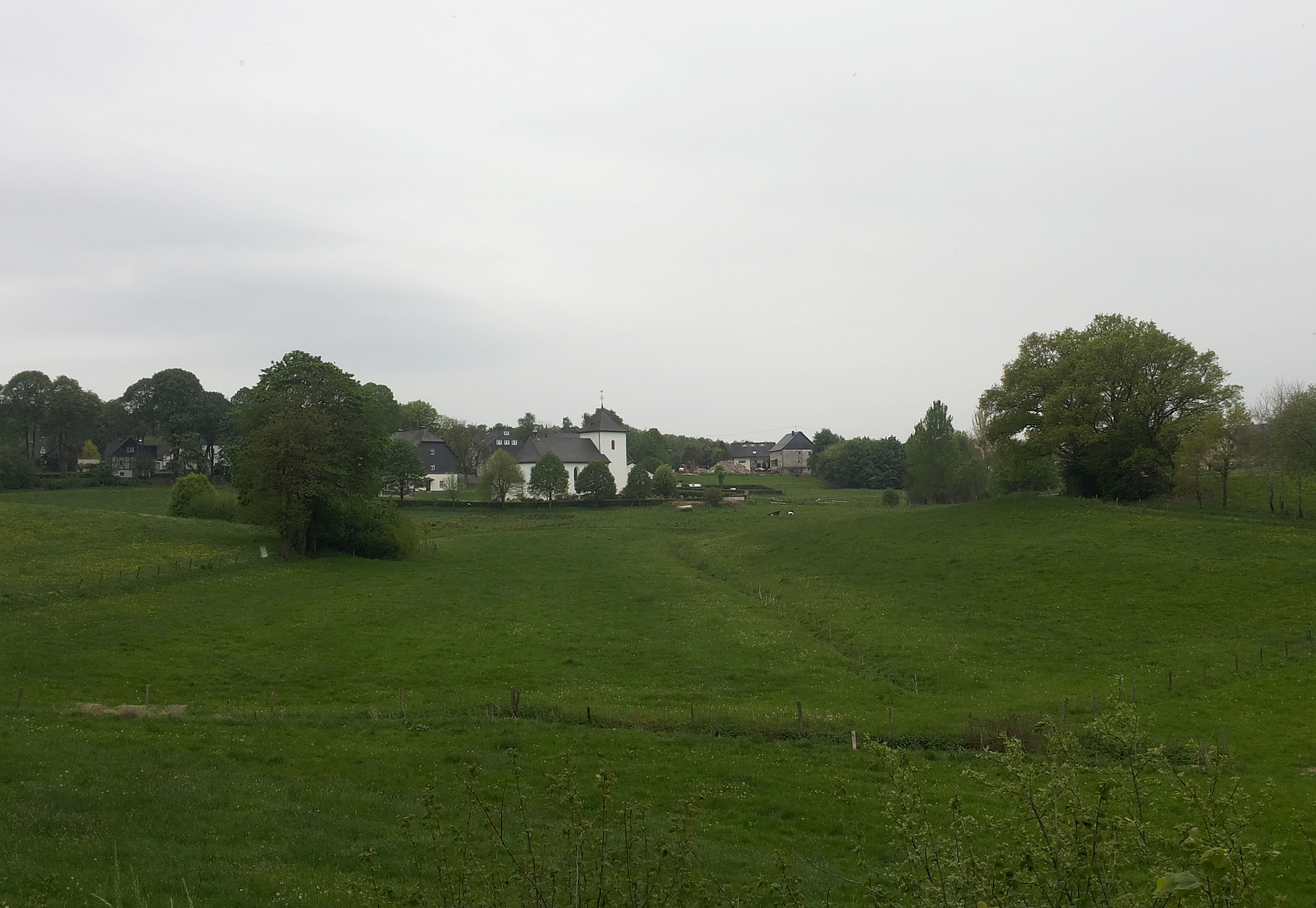
Römershagen is the place of Bigge's source

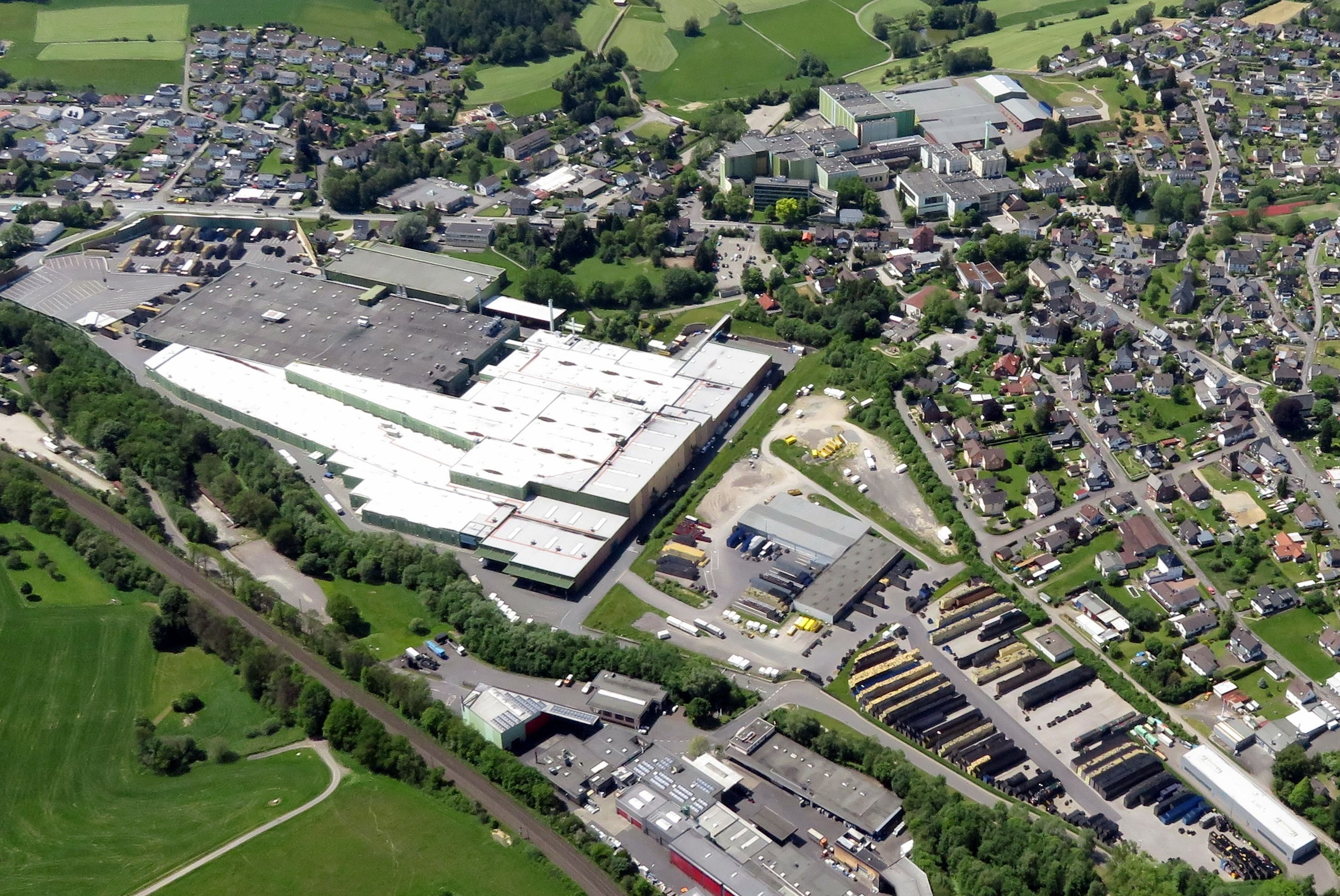
Brewery at Krombach

Along Siegerland-Höhenring, the path crosses twelve villages and leads directly or indirectly past around 70 more.

Villages along Siegerland-Höhenring
clockwise, beginning in the north
inside circle	traversed	outside circle
Burgholdinghausen		Welschen Ennest
Müsen		Silberg
Dahlbruch		
Hilchenbach		Brachthausen
		Heinsberg
Hadem		
Helberhausen		
Oberndorf		
		Zinse
Vormwald		
Grund		
	Ginsberg heather / Giller	
	Lützel	
Sohlbach	(Lützel settlement)	
	Benfe	
	Großenbach	
Walpersdorf		
		Welschengeheu
		Heiligenborn
Werthenbach		
Hainchen		Rittershausen
		Offdilln
Gernsdorf		Dillbrecht
Rudersdorf		Fellerdilln
		Steinbach
		Industrial area Kalteiche
	Wü.-Wasserscheide	
(Würgendorf)		Holzhausen
Burbach		Niederdresselndorf
(Burbach)		Lützeln
Business park Siegerland		Siegerland Airport
	Lippe	
		Daaden military training area
		Emmertshausen
Wahlbach		
		Daaden
Altenseelbach		
Struthütten		
	Herdorf	
		Sassenroth
		Grünebach
	Offhausen	
		Herkersdorf
Katzenbach		
	Kirchen	
	Freusburg	Wehbach
	Niederfischbach	(Fischbacherhütte)
		Langenbach
Oberasdorf		
Plittershagen		Löcherbach
	Hofgut Stöcken	(Löcherbach)
	Oberstöcken	
		Obersolbach
		Mittelsolbach
		Niedersolbach
	Friesenhagen	
	Crottorf	Crottorf castle
		Unterweidenbruch
		Weierseifen
		Schlade
		Römershagen
Wildenburg castle		
(Wildenburg)		
	(Wildenburg railway station)	
Heiligenborn		
Hühnerkamp		
	Löffelberg	
Bockseifen		Hünsborn
Bühl		
Industrial area Wilhelmshöhe		
Oberholzklau		
Meiswinkel		
Oberhees		
		Altenhof
		Girkhausen
Osthelden		Schönau-Altenwenden
Bockenbach		(Altenwenden)
Eichen		
Krombach		Scheiderwald
(Krombach)		Altenkleusheim
(Krombach)		Neuenkleusheim
Littfeld		Kruberg
		Rahrbach

== Extreme points ==
The northernmost point of the route is near the Littfe spring in the Kirchhundem-Welschen Ennest area, while the easternmost and highest point is near Jagdberg in the town of Netphen. The southernmost point of the Siegerland-Höhenring is in the Burbach district of Lippe and the westernmost point is close to the moated Crottorf Castle, which belongs to Friesenhagen.

51.038643°N 8.013900°E (northernmost point of the Siegerland-Höhenring)

50.882603°N 8.270365°E (easternmost and highest point of the Siegerland-Höhenring)

50.708535°N 8.059648°E (southernmost point of the Siegerland-Höhenring)

50.904822°N 7.786492°E (westernmost point of the Siegerland-Höhenring)

== Waymarker ==
Sauerländischer Gebirgsverein (Sauerland Mountain Association) (SGV) uses an upside-down square (colloquially “rhombus”) as a sign for the district hiking trail of an SGV district. This can be supplemented with the number "1" to distinguish the marking from those of the same type.

== Cultural specifics ==
The Siegerland-Höhenring runs along the Ruhr-Sieg watershed, which in Southern Westphalia and on the border between Sauerland and Wildenburger Land also depicts the bundle of isoglosses of Benrath ("maken" and "machen" for make) and Uerdingen lines ("ik" and "ich" for I/me) lines, and then (clockwise) onto the Sieg-Eder watershed and the Sieg-Lahn watershed, which is almost identical to the St. Goar line ("das" and "dat" for that) in the Siegen-Wittgenstein district and on the border with Hesse. The St. Goar line is crossed four times, towards the borders to Wittgenstein and Hesse and back.
