= Siegen-Wittgenstein (electoral district) =

Electoral constituency in Germany

147 Siegen-Wittgenstein
- Electoral district for the Bundestag
- Siegen-Wittgenstein in 2025
- State: North Rhine-Westphalia
- Population: 276,900 (2019)
- Electorate: 207,672 (2021)
- Major settlements: Siegen; Kreuztal; Netphen
- Area: 1,132.9 km^{2}

Current electoral district
- Created: 1949
- Party: CDU
- Member: Benedikt Büdenbender
- Elected: 2025

Siegen-Wittgenstein is an electoral constituency (German: Wahlkreis) represented in the Bundestag. It elects one member via first-past-the-post voting. Under the current constituency numbering system, it is designated as constituency 147. It is located in southern North Rhine-Westphalia, comprising the district of Siegen-Wittgenstein.

Siegen-Wittgenstein was created for the inaugural 1949 federal election. From 2009 to 2025, it was represented by Volkmar Klein of the Christian Democratic Union (CDU). Since 2025 it has been represented by Benedikt Büdenbender of the CDU.

== Geography ==
Siegen-Wittgenstein is located in southern North Rhine-Westphalia. As of the 2021 federal election, it is coterminous with the Siegen-Wittgenstein district.

== History ==
Siegen-Wittgenstein was created in 1949, then known as Siegen-Stadt und -Land – Wittgenstein. From 1965 through 1976, it was named Siegen – Wittgenstein. From 1980 through 1998, it was named Siegen-Wittgenstein I. It acquired its current name in the 2002 election. In the 1949 election, it was North Rhine-Westphalia constituency 66 in the numbering system. In the 1953 through 1976 elections, it was number 125. From 1980 through 1998, it was number 120. From 2002 through 2009, it was number 149. In the 2013 through 2021 elections, it was number 148. From the 2025 election, it has been number 147.

Originally, the constituency comprised the independent city of Siegen as well as the districts of Landkreis Siegen and Wittgenstein. In the 1969 and 1972 elections, it comprised the districts of Siegen and Wittgenstein. In the 1976 election, it was coterminous with the Siegen-Wittgenstein district. In the 1980 through 1998 elections, it comprised the Siegen-Wittgenstein district without the municipalities of Freudenberg, Hilchenbach, and Kreuztal. Since the 2002 election, it has again been coterminous with the Siegen-Wittgenstein district.

Election	No.	Name	Borders
1949	66	Siegen-Stadt und -Land – Wittgenstein	Siegen city; Landkreis Siegen district; Wittgenstein district
1953	125	Siegen-Stadt und -Land – Wittgenstein	Siegen city; Landkreis Siegen district; Wittgenstein district
1957	125	Siegen-Stadt und -Land – Wittgenstein	Siegen city; Landkreis Siegen district; Wittgenstein district
1961	125	Siegen-Stadt und -Land – Wittgenstein	Siegen city; Landkreis Siegen district; Wittgenstein district
1965	125	Siegen – Wittgenstein	Siegen city; Landkreis Siegen district; Wittgenstein district
1969	125	Siegen – Wittgenstein	Siegen district; Wittgenstein district
1972	125	Siegen – Wittgenstein	Siegen district; Wittgenstein district
1976	125	Siegen – Wittgenstein	Siegen-Wittgenstein district
1980	120	Siegen-Wittgenstein I	Siegen-Wittgenstein district (excluding Freudenberg, Hilchenbach, and Kreuztal municipalities)
1983	120	Siegen-Wittgenstein I	Siegen-Wittgenstein district (excluding Freudenberg, Hilchenbach, and Kreuztal municipalities)
1987	120	Siegen-Wittgenstein I	Siegen-Wittgenstein district (excluding Freudenberg, Hilchenbach, and Kreuztal municipalities)
1990	120	Siegen-Wittgenstein I	Siegen-Wittgenstein district (excluding Freudenberg, Hilchenbach, and Kreuztal municipalities)
1994	120	Siegen-Wittgenstein I	Siegen-Wittgenstein district (excluding Freudenberg, Hilchenbach, and Kreuztal municipalities)
1998	120	Siegen-Wittgenstein I	Siegen-Wittgenstein district (excluding Freudenberg, Hilchenbach, and Kreuztal municipalities)
2002	149	Siegen-Wittgenstein	Siegen-Wittgenstein district
2005	149	Siegen-Wittgenstein	Siegen-Wittgenstein district
2009	149	Siegen-Wittgenstein	Siegen-Wittgenstein district
2013	148	Siegen-Wittgenstein	Siegen-Wittgenstein district
2017	148	Siegen-Wittgenstein	Siegen-Wittgenstein district
2021	148	Siegen-Wittgenstein	Siegen-Wittgenstein district
2025	147	Siegen-Wittgenstein	Siegen-Wittgenstein district

== Members ==
The constituency was first represented by Theodor Siebel of the Christian Democratic Union (CDU) from 1949 to 1961. Hermann Schmidt of the Social Democratic Party (SPD) was elected in 1961 and served a single term, before Botho Prinz zu Sayn-Wittgenstein-Hohenstein regained it for the CDU in 1965. Schmidt was once again elected in 1969 and served four further terms as representative. Paul Breuer of the CDU was elected in 1983 and served until 1998. Marianne Klappert gained the constituency for the SPD in the 1998 election, and was succeeded in 2002 by fellow party member Willi Brase. Volkmar Klein of the CDU was elected in 2009, and re-elected in 2013, 2017, and 2021. In 2025 Benedikt Büdenbender, also of the CDU, succeeded Klein.

Election	Member	Party	%
1949	Theodor Siebel	CDU	38.0
1953	Theodor Siebel	CDU	46.2
1957	Theodor Siebel	CDU	51.4
1961	Hermann Schmidt	SPD	41.6
1965	Botho Prinz zu Sayn-Wittgenstein-Hohenstein	CDU	46.2
1969	Hermann Schmidt	SPD	49.7
1972	Hermann Schmidt	SPD	54.0
1976	Hermann Schmidt	SPD	48.4
1980	Hermann Schmidt	SPD	49.5
1983	Paul Breuer	CDU	50.6
1987	Paul Breuer	CDU	45.8
1990	Paul Breuer	CDU	45.6
1994	Paul Breuer	CDU	44.1
1998	Marianne Klappert	SPD	46.4
2002	Willi Brase	SPD	44.3
2005	Willi Brase	SPD	43.6
2009	Volkmar Klein	CDU	41.5
2013	Volkmar Klein	CDU	45.8
2017	Volkmar Klein	CDU	40.1
2021	Volkmar Klein	CDU	33.6
2025	Benedikt Büdenbender	CDU	34.1

== Election results ==
=== 2025 election ===
Federal election (2025): Siegen-Wittgenstein
Notes:	Blue background denotes the winner of the electorate vote. Pink background denotes a candidate elected from their party list. Yellow background denotes an electorate win by a list member, or other incumbent. A ✓ or ✗ denotes status of any incumbent, win or lose respectively.						
Party	Candidate	Votes	%	±%	Party votes	%	±%
CDU	Benedikt Büdenbender	56,827	34.1	▲0.5	52,767	31.6	▲5.4
SPD	Luiza Licina-Bode	40,825	24.5	▼5.9	33,313	19.9	▼11.3
AfD	Christian Zaum	34,137	20.5	▲11.5	33905	20.3	▲11.1
Greens	Laura Kraft	12,486	7.5	▼2.9	14,338	8.6	▼2.5
Left	Katrin Fey	10,725	6.4	▲3.4	12,099	7.2	▲3.7
BSW					7,472	4.5	
FDP	Guido Müller	5,300	3.2	▼5.3	6,628	4.0	▼7.6
FW	Benjamin Grimm	2,340	1.4	▲0.2	1,297	0.8	▼0.1
PARTEI	Tobias Wied	2,190	1.3	▼0.8	1,004	0.6	▼0.7
Tierschutzpartei					1,915	1.1	▼0.2
Volt	Luis Heinz	1,290	0.8	▲0.3	925	0.6	▲0.1
Values	Andreas Klein	670	0.4		346	0.2	
dieBasis	Hubert Weber			▼1.4	418	0.2	▼1.1
BD					245	0.1	
Team Todenhöfer					244	0.1	▼0.4
PdF					224	0.1	▲0.1
MERA25					45	0.0	
MLPD					26	0.0	0.0
Pirates							▼0.3
Bündnis C							▼0.3
ÖDP							▼0.2
Gesundheitsforschung							▼0.1
Humanists							▼0.1
SGP						0.0	0.0
Informal votes		1,419			998		
Total valid votes		166,790			167,211		
Turnout		168,209	83.1	▲5.0			
CDU hold	Majority	16,002	9.6				

=== 2021 election ===
Federal election (2021): Siegen-Wittgenstein
Notes:	Blue background denotes the winner of the electorate vote. Pink background denotes a candidate elected from their party list. Yellow background denotes an electorate win by a list member, or other incumbent. A ✓ or ✗ denotes status of any incumbent, win or lose respectively.						
Party	Candidate	Votes	%	±%	Party votes	%	±%
CDU	✓ Volkmar Klein	54,042	33.6	▼6.5	42,161	26.2	▼7.8
SPD	Luiza Licina-Bode	48,897	30.4	▲0.2	50,327	31.3	▲4.8
Greens	Laura Kraft	16,624	10.3	▲6.1	17,842	11.1	▲5.6
AfD	Henning Zoz	14,424	9.0	▼0.8	14,709	9.1	▼1.5
FDP	Guido Müller	13,586	8.5	▲1.1	18,597	11.6	▼0.3
Left	Ekkard Büdenbender	4,900	3.0	▼2.9	5,726	3.6	▼4.3
Tierschutzpartei					2,099	1.3	▲0.6
PARTEI	Tobias Wied	3,385	2.1	▲0.7	2,043	1.3	▲0.4
dieBasis	Hubert Weber	2,215	1.4		2,107	1.3	
FW	Horst Linde	1,868	1.2		1,340	0.8	▲0.6
Team Todenhöfer					886	0.6	
Volt	Inka Berg	836	0.5		679	0.4	
Pirates					485	0.3	▼0.1
Bündnis C					467	0.3	
ÖDP					358	0.2	▼0.1
LIEBE					198	0.1	
Gesundheitsforschung					182	0.1	0.0
NPD					166	0.1	▼0.2
Humanists					156	0.1	0.0
LfK					134	0.1	
V-Partei3					103	0.1	0.0
du.					68	0.0	
PdF					51	0.0	
Independent	Roland Meister	49	0.0				
DKP					47	0.0	0.0
LKR					36	0.0	
MLPD					24	0.0	0.0
SGP					7	0.0	0.0
Informal votes		1,336			1,164		
Total valid votes		160,826			160,998		
Turnout		162,162	78.1	▲1.9			
CDU hold	Majority	5,145	3.2	▼6.7			

=== 2017 election ===
Federal election (2017): Siegen-Wittgenstein
Notes:	Blue background denotes the winner of the electorate vote. Pink background denotes a candidate elected from their party list. Yellow background denotes an electorate win by a list member, or other incumbent. A ✓ or ✗ denotes status of any incumbent, win or lose respectively.						
Party	Candidate	Votes	%	±%	Party votes	%	±%
CDU	✓ Volkmar Klein	64,484	40.1	▼5.6	54,648	34.0	▼7.6
SPD	Heiko Becker	48,560	30.2	▼6.3	42,551	26.4	▼5.6
AfD	Andreas Appelt	15,728	9.8	▲6.7	17,154	10.7	▲5.7
FDP	Hermann Siebdrat	11,742	7.3	▲5.1	19,125	11.9	▲7.2
Left	Sylvia Gabelmann	9,554	5.9	▲1.5	12,624	7.8	▼2.1
Greens	Simon Rock	6,885	4.3	▼0.8	8,857	5.5	▼0.9
PARTEI	Florian Kiel	2,190	1.4		1,442	0.9	▲0.6
Tierschutzpartei					1,116	0.7	
ÖDP	Jörn Krause	1,002	0.6		578	0.4	▲0.2
Pirates					566	0.4	▼1.4
Independent	Dominik Eichbaum	556	0.3				
AD-DEMOKRATEN					492	0.3	
NPD					411	0.3	▼0.9
FW					410	0.3	▲0.1
Volksabstimmung					145	0.1	▼0.1
DM					142	0.1	
V-Partei³					141	0.1	
DiB					131	0.1	
Gesundheitsforschung					130	0.1	
BGE					122	0.1	
Die Humanisten					93	0.1	
MLPD					41	0.0	0.0
DKP					33	0.0	
SGP					7	0.0	0.0
Informal votes		1,605			1,347		
Total valid votes		160,701			160,959		
Turnout		162,306	76.2	▲3.7			
CDU hold	Majority	15,924	9.9	▲0.6			

=== 2013 election ===
Federal election (2013): Siegen-Wittgenstein
Notes:	Blue background denotes the winner of the electorate vote. Pink background denotes a candidate elected from their party list. Yellow background denotes an electorate win by a list member, or other incumbent. A ✓ or ✗ denotes status of any incumbent, win or lose respectively.						
Party	Candidate	Votes	%	±%	Party votes	%	±%
CDU	✓ Volkmar Klein	70,833	45.8	▲4.2	64,307	41.5	▲6.7
SPD	Willi Brase	56,510	36.5	▼2.6	49,563	32.0	▲3.1
Greens	Peter Neuhaus	7,808	5.0		9,937	6.4	▼2.2
Left	Peter Schulte	6,891	4.5	▼3.3	8,920	5.8	▼2.2
AfD		4,744	3.1		7,653	4.9	
FDP	Helga Daub	3,383	2.2	▼7.8	7,327	4.7	▼10.1
Pirates	Nils Faerber	2,732	1.8		2,722	1.8	▲0.4
NPD		1,856	1.2	▼0.4	1,759	1.1	▼0.1
PARTEI					450	0.3	
BIG					406	0.3	
PRO					312	0.2	
Volksabstimmung					312	0.2	▲0.1
ÖDP					286	0.2	0.0
REP					269	0.2	▼0.3
FW					243	0.2	
Nichtwahler					146	0.1	
Party of Reason					101	0.1	
RRP					55	0.0	▼0.1
MLPD					41	0.0	0.0
PSG					35	0.0	0.0
Die Rechte					30	0.0	
BüSo					22	0.0	0.0
Informal votes		1,812			1,673		
Total valid votes		154,757			154,896		
Turnout		156,569	72.6	▲0.7			
CDU hold	Majority	14,323	9.3	▲6.9			

=== 2009 election ===
Federal election (2009): Siegen-Wittgenstein
Notes:	Blue background denotes the winner of the electorate vote. Pink background denotes a candidate elected from their party list. Yellow background denotes an electorate win by a list member, or other incumbent. A ✓ or ✗ denotes status of any incumbent, win or lose respectively.						
Party	Candidate	Votes	%	±%	Party votes	%	±%
CDU	Volkmar Klein	64,217	41.5	0.0	53,999	34.8	▼1.8
SPD	✗ Willi Brase	60,500	39.1	▼4.4	44,822	28.9	▼10.2
FDP	Helga Daub	15,482	10.0	▲5.1	23,059	14.9	▲5.4
Greens					13,385	8.6	▲2.9
Left	Peter Schulte	12,009	7.8	▲4.0	12,362	8.0	▲2.7
Pirates					2,044	1.3	
NPD	Stefan Flug	2,399	1.6	▲0.8	1,910	1.2	▲0.5
Tierschutzpartei					920	0.6	0.0
FAMILIE					755	0.5	▲0.1
REP					660	0.4	▼0.4
RENTNER					485	0.3	
ÖDP					218	0.1	
RRP					200	0.1	
Volksabstimmung					152	0.1	0.0
Centre					88	0.1	0.0
DVU					67	0.0	
BüSo					26	0.0	0.0
MLPD					22	0.0	0.0
PSG					22	0.0	0.0
Informal votes		2,271			1,682		
Total valid votes		154,607			155,196		
Turnout		156,878	71.8	▼6.3			
CDU gain from SPD	Majority	3,717	2.4				

=== 2005 election ===
Federal election (2005): Siegen-Wittgenstein
Notes:	Blue background denotes the winner of the electorate vote. Pink background denotes a candidate elected from their party list. Yellow background denotes an electorate win by a list member, or other incumbent. A ✓ or ✗ denotes status of any incumbent, win or lose respectively.						
Party	Candidate	Votes	%	±%	Party votes	%	±%
SPD	✓ Willi Brase	73,703	43.6	▼0.7	66,083	39.0	▼2.7
CDU	Ulrich Künkler	70,260	41.5	▼1.4	61,957	36.6	▼1.5
FDP	Helga Daub	8,240	4.9	▼1.0	15,996	9.5	▲0.6
Left	Ullrich-Eberhardt Georgi	6,415	3.8	▲2.9	8,830	5.2	▲4.2
Greens	Hans-Peter Neuhaus	6,097	3.6	▼0.5	9,757	5.8	▼1.2
Tierschutzpartei	Jürgen Foß	1,694	1.0		1,013	0.6	▲0.3
REP	Frank Maul	1,462	0.9		1,367	0.8	▲0.3
NPD	Stephan Flug	1,328	0.8		1,270	0.8	▲0.5
PBC					1,424	0.8	▲0.1
Familie					694	0.4	▲0.2
GRAUEN					448	0.3	▲0.1
From Now on... Democracy Through Referendum					206	0.1	
BüSo					65	0.0	
Centre					59	0.0	
Socialist Equality Party					54	0.0	
MLPD					37	0.0	0.0
Informal votes		2,127			2,066		
Total valid votes		169,199			169,260		
Turnout		171,326	78.1	▼2.8			
SPD hold	Majority	3,443	2.1				
