= Siebel (disambiguation) =

Siebel may refer to:

== Companies ==
- Siebel, a German aircraft manufacturer founded in 1937 in Halle an der Saale
- Siebel Systems, a software company principally engaged in the design, development, marketing and support of customer relationship management (CRM) applications.

== People ==
- Carl Siebel (1836–1868), German merchant and poet
- Christin Siebel (born 1985), German politician
- Fritz Siebel (1913–1991), Austrian American illustrator
- Jennifer Siebel Newsom (born 1974), American documentary filmmaker and First Lady of California since 2019
- Pablo Siebel (born 1954), Chilean painter
- Paul Siebel (born 1937), American singer-songwriter and guitarist
- Theodor Siebel (1897–1975), German politician
- Thomas Siebel (born 1952), American business executive
- Tillmann Siebel (1804–1875), German revival preacher in the Siegerland
- Wigand Siebel (1929–2014), German sociologist
- A character in the opera Faust

Siebels may refer to:

- George G. Siebels, Jr. (1913–2000), first Republican Mayor of Birmingham, Alabama
- Jon Siebels, (born 1979), guitarist in the band Eve 6
- Paul Siebels (born 1912), Belgian rower
- Wiard Siebels (born 1978), German politician
