= Nister-Möhrendorf =

- Municipality
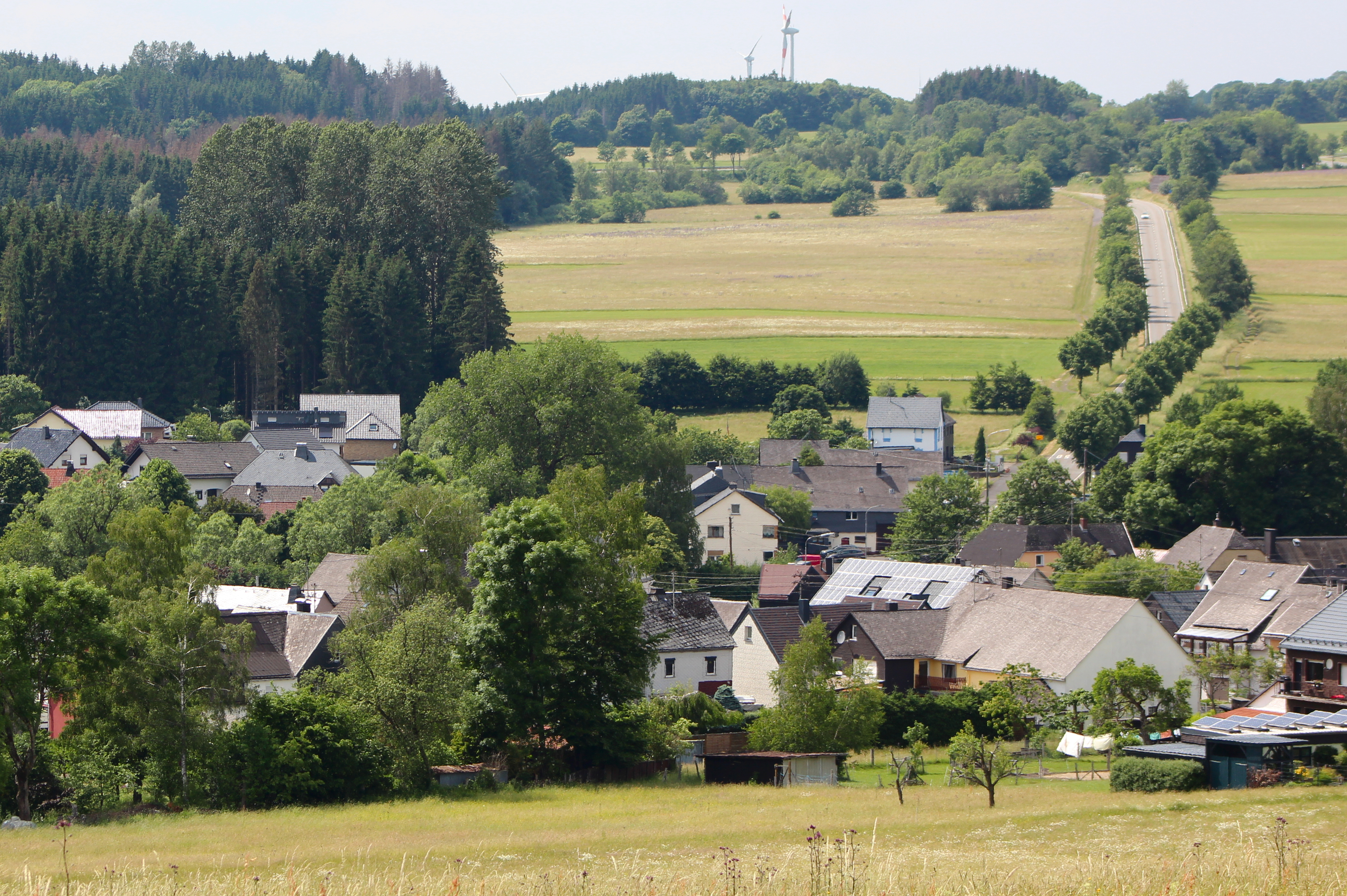

- Coat of arms

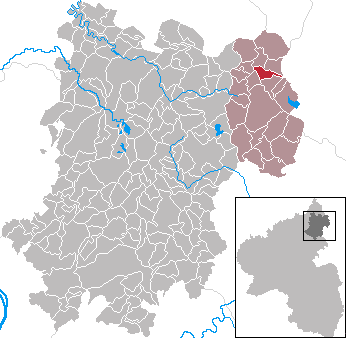
- Location of Nister-Möhrendorf within Westerwaldkreis district
- Interactive map of Nister-Möhrendorf
- Location within Germany Location within Rhineland-Palatinate
- Coordinates: 50°39′23″N 8°4′40″E
- Country: Germany
- State: Rhineland-Palatinate
- District: Westerwaldkreis
- Municipal assoc.: Rennerod

Government
  - Mayor: Christian Dietrich

Area
  - Total: 2.97 km^{2} (1.15 sq mi)
- Elevation: 530 m (1,740 ft)

Population (2025-12-31)
  - Total: 299
  - Density: 101/km^{2} (261/sq mi)
- Time zone: UTC+01:00 (CET)
  - Summer (DST): UTC+02:00 (CEST)
- Postal codes: 56477
- Dialling codes: 02667
- Vehicle registration: WW
- Website: www.rennerod.de

Nister-Möhrendorf is an Ortsgemeinde – a community belonging to a Verbandsgemeinde – in the Westerwaldkreis in Rhineland-Palatinate, Germany.

== Geography ==
The community lies in the Westerwald between Limburg and Siegen. Through the community flows the Große Nister. Nister-Möhrendorf belongs to the Verbandsgemeinde of Rennerod, a kind of collective municipality. Its seat is in the like-named town.

== History ==
Both villages Nister and Möhrendorf had their first documentary mention in 1300. They were united in 1829.

At the latest since 1733, a mill had been in operation. Between 1820 and 1861, even two mills are listed in Nassau government records. The last miller ceased his work in 1959.

== Politics ==
The municipal council is made up of 8 council members who were elected in a majority vote in a municipal election on June 9, 2024.

== Economy and infrastructure ==
=== Transport ===
The local bus line 477 connects the village to the public transport, it is located in the area of the transport association Verkehrsverbund Rhein-Mosel (VRM), zone number 459. Running right through the community is Bundesstraße 414, leading from Herborn to Hachenburg. The nearest Autobahn interchange is Haiger/Burbach on the A 45 (Dortmund–Aschaffenburg), some 16 km away. The nearest InterCityExpress stop is the railway station at Montabaur on the Cologne-Frankfurt high-speed rail line.

=== Education ===
In Nister-Möhrendorf, the primary school 'Hoher Westerwald' and a kindergarten are located.
