= Büdenbender =

Büdenbender is a surname of German origin. Notable people with the surname include:

- Benedikt Büdenbender (born 1989), German politician
- Elke Büdenbender (born 1962), German jurist
