= Willi Brase =

German politician and member of the SPD

Willi Brase (born 10 October 1951 in Petershagen, North Rhine-Westphalia) is a German politician and member of the SPD.

Willi Brase is married with two children and is a Protestant. Brase attended elementary school in Quetzen from 1958 to 1966. He then went to school, for three years, for business training in wholesale and foreign trade. Next, he went to Technical College from 1969 to 1971, and moved on to study social education at Niederrhein University of Applied Science. He completed compulsory military service in 1971 and did alternative service in 1972. From 1979 to 1981 he was a social worker at the Youth Office of Monchengladbach.

A politician of the social democratic party (SPD) of Germany. On 30 September 2012, Willi Brase resigned from the office of DGB Region Chairman. In 1976 he was a member of Verdi. From 1989 to 1994 he was the chairman of the DGB district of Siegen-Wittgenstein. He represented the equivalent district in the Bundestag from 2002 to 2009. From 1994 until September 30, 2012, he was DGB Region Chairman of Siegen-Wittgenstein-Olpe.
