= Tillmann Siebel =

Tillmann Siebel (born 1804 in Freudenberg (Siegerland); died 1875 in Freudenberg) was a German revival preacher who is regarded as the “father of Christian life in the Siegerland.”

== Life and work ==
Tillmann Siebel, born in 1804 in Freudenberg (Siegerland), was a tannery-owner.

In the Siegen church district, a revival movement emerged during his youth, supported by laypeople and for a long time opposed by pastors and the authorities. The leading figures were the shoemaker Johann Heinrich Weisgerber and Tillmann Siebel. Those who were awakened remained within the regional church but additionally organized themselves into free congregations that belonged to the Evangelical Alliance (Evangelische Allianz).

According to Thomas Ijewski, Tillmann Siebel was “the unrivaled leader of the Siegerland Awakening. With him the town of Freudenberg became the center of this movement.”

By the 19th century at the latest, distinct structures had emerged within the pietistic movement in the Siegerland, originating from revivalist influences of Pietism in the Wuppertal region. This led to the founding of the Evangelische Gemeinschaftsverband Siegerland-Wittgenstein in 1853 as Verein für Reisepredigt (an association for itinerant preaching) in Weidenau near Siegen. In 1853, Tillmann Siebel was elected as the first Präses (presiding officer) of the association, exerting a decisive influence on the movement.

The gravestone of Tillmann Siebel in the Freudenberg cemetery is listed on the list of architectural monuments of Freudenberg.

The Tillmann-Siebel-Haus of the Evangelical parish of Freudenberg is named after him.

== See also ==
- Neupietismus (in German)
- Kirchenkreis Siegen-Wittgenstein (in German)
- Evangelischer Brüderverein (in Elberfeld, today Wuppertal) (in German)
- Deutsche Zeltmission (in German)

== Bibliography ==
- Evangelical Christendom 1880, Band 21 (p. 218: “Revival in Westphalia”)
