= Luiza Licina-Bode =

German politician

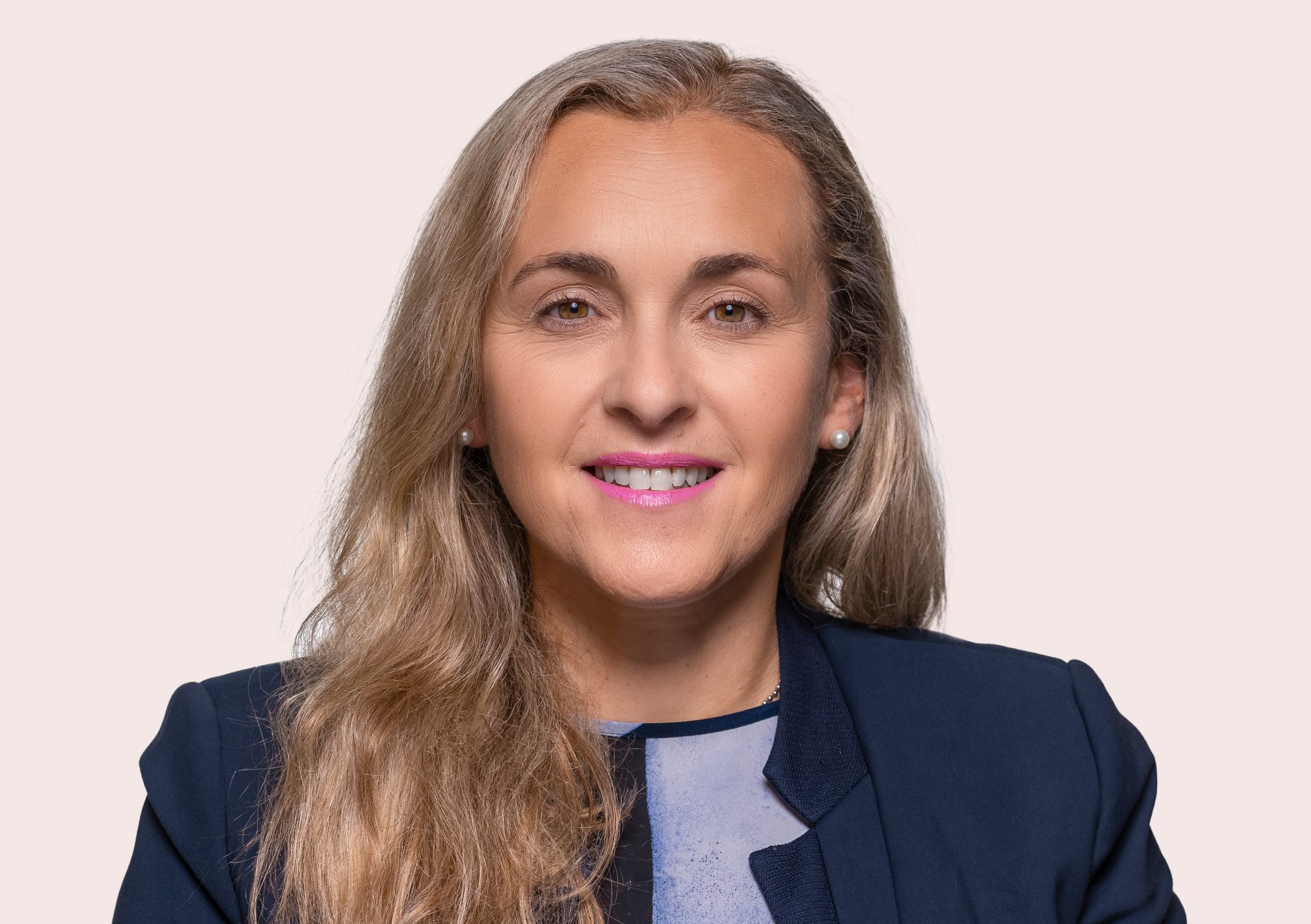

Member of the Bundestag
- Incumbent
- Assumed office 2021

Personal details
- Born: 10 October 1972 (age 53) Bad Berleburg, West Germany
- Party: SPD
- Education: Ruhr University Bochum

Luiza Licina-Bode (born 10 October 1972) is a German politician of the Social Democratic Party (SPD) who has been serving as a member of the Bundestag since 2021.

== Early life and education ==
Licina-Bode was born 1972 in the West German town of Bad Berleburg and studied law at the Ruhr University Bochum in order to become a lawyer.

== Political career ==
Licina-Bode entered the SPD in 2005 and was elected to the Bundestag in the 2021 elections, representing the Siegen-Wittgenstein district.

In parliament, Licina-Bode has since been serving on the Committee on Legal Affairs and the Committee on Food and Agriculture.

== Other activities ==
- University of Siegen, Member of the Board of Trustees (since 2022)
- German United Services Trade Union (ver.di), Member (since 2015)
