= Benedikt Büdenbender =

German politician (born 1989)

Member of the Bundestag
- Assuming office TBD
- Succeeding: Volkmar Klein
- Constituency: Siegen-Wittgenstein

Personal details
- Born: 31 July 1989 (age 36)
- Party: Christian Democratic Union

Benedikt Büdenbender (born 31 July 1989) is a German politician who was elected as a member of the Bundestag in 2025. He has served as chairman of the Christian Democratic Union in Siegen-Wittgenstein since 2023.
