= Botho Prinz zu Sayn-Wittgenstein-Hohenstein =

German politician

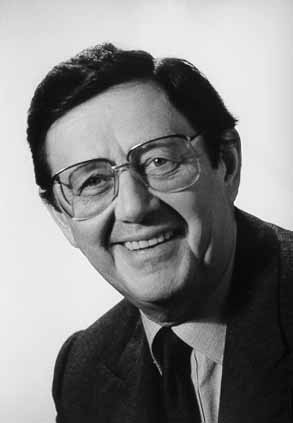
Botho Prinz zu Sayn-Wittgenstein-Hohenstein.

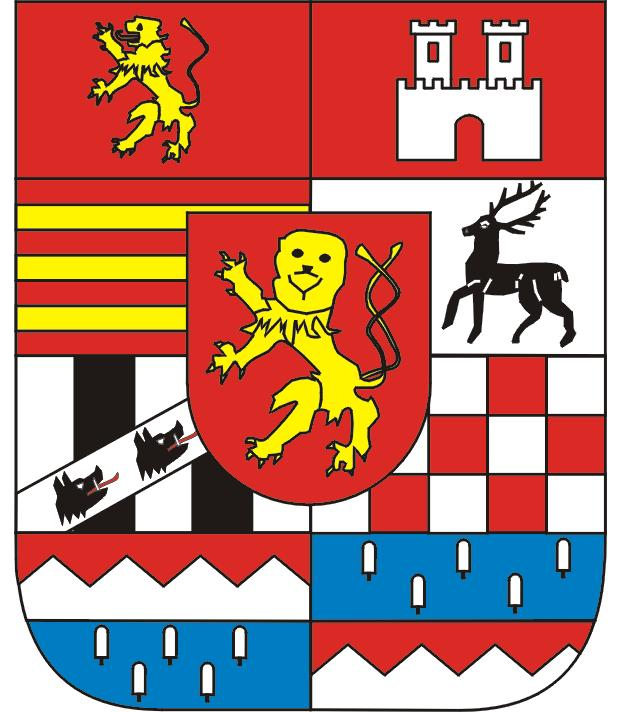
Coat of arms of Sayn-Wittgenstein-Hohenstein

Botho Prinz zu Sayn-Wittgenstein-Hohenstein (16 February 1927 in Eisenach – 27 January 2008 in Salzburg) was a German politician.

== Early life and ancestry ==
Born into the House of Sayn-Wittgenstein-Hohenstein, one of the oldest houses of German nobility, Botho was second son and youngest child of Prince Georg Wilhelm Friedrich Hermann zu Sayn-Wittgenstein-Hohenstein (1873-1960) and his de-morganatized wife, Marie Rühm, Baroness von Freusburg (1892-1975).

== Career ==
He was a member of the Christian Democratic Union and represented the party in the Bundestag from 1965 to 1980. He first gained a direct mandate as representative of Siegen-Wittgenstein and subsequently was elected from the land list.

He served as president of the German Red Cross between 1982 and 1994.

== Private life ==
On 25 May in Bad Laasphe, he married Baroness Elisabeth Ilse Sonja Sylvia Karoline von Zedlitz und Leipe (1937-2020).

They had one son and two daughters:

- Georg Christian Sigmund Winfired Rolf, Prinz zu Sayn-Wittgenstein-Hohenstein (b. 1960), married Benedikta von Wolffersdorff-Mellin (b. 1961) and had issue
- Friederike Maria Monika Jutta, Prinzessin zu Sayn-Wittgenstein-Hohenstein (b. 1961), married Heinrich Frömbling (b. 1959) and has issue
- Katharina Viktoria Ellinor, Prinzessin zu Sayn-Wittgenstein-Hohenstein (b. 1965), married Joachim Friedrich (1961) and has issue

== External links and references ==
- Welt Online: Botho Prinz zu Sayn-Wittgenstein-Hohenstein obituary (German) 28 January 2008
