= Laura Kraft =

German politician (born 1990)

Member of the Bundestag
- Incumbent
- Assumed office 26 October 2021

Personal details
- Born: 1 December 1990 (age 35) Hofgeismar, Germany
- Party: Alliance 90/The Greens
- Education: University of Siegen; Åbo Akademi University

Laura Kraft (born 1 December 1990) is a German politician of the Alliance 90/The Greens who has been a member of the Bundestag since the 2021 German federal election, representing the Siegen-Wittgenstein district.

== Life ==
Kraft completed her Abitur in Hofgeismar in 2010. She then studied at the University of Siegen, where she obtained a bachelor's degree in literature, culture and media in 2013 and a master's degree in literary studies in 2017. In 2015, she completed a year abroad at Åbo Akademi University in Turku, Finland. From 2017 to 2020, she was a research assistant to Niels Werber at the Chair of Modern German Literature I in Siegen. Since 2020, she has been a research assistant to Jörg Döring at the Chair of Modern German Philology, Media and Cultural Studies at the University of Siegen (released from the University of Siegen while exercising her mandate).

== Political career ==
In 2020, she ran as a district administrator for Siegen-Wittgenstein in the local elections in North Rhine-Westphalia. However, she lost to Andreas Müller (politician, 1983). At the beginning of the legislative period in October 2021, she is a member of the Bundestag for the Alliance 90/The Greens. She ran in the Bundestag constituency of Siegen-Wittgenstein and entered the German Bundestag via list position 23 on the state list.

In parliament, Kraft serves on the Committee on Education, Research and Technology Assessment, the Committee on the Environment, Nature Conservation, Nuclear Safety and Consumer Protection and the Subcommittee on Foreign Cultural and Educational Policy.

In addition to her committee assignments, Kraft has been a member of the German delegation to the Franco-German Parliamentary Assembly since 2022. She is also part of the German-Nordic Parliamentary Friendship Group, which is in charge of maintaining inter-parliamentary relations with Denmark, Finland, Iceland, Norway and Sweden.

== Other activities ==
- University of Siegen, Member of the Board of Trustees (since 2022)
- German National Association for Student Affairs, Ex-Officio Member of the Board of Trustees (since 2022)
