= Niederholzklau =

- Ortsteil of Freudenberg
- Interactive map of Niederholzklau
- Location within Germany Location within North Rhine-Westphalia
- Coordinates: 50°54′45″N 07°57′03″E
- Country: Germany
- State: North Rhine-Westphalia
- Admin. region: Arnsberg
- District: Siegen-Wittgenstein
- Town: Freudenberg
- Founded: 1256

Area
  - Total: 2.02 km^{2} (0.78 sq mi)
- Elevation: 310 m (1,020 ft)
- Time zone: UTC+01:00 (CET)
  - Summer (DST): UTC+02:00 (CEST)
- Postal codes: 57258
- Dialling codes: 0271
- Vehicle registration: SI
- Website: Faltblatt der Stadt

Niederholzklau is a constituent community of Freudenberg, Siegen-Wittgenstein, North Rhine-Westphalia, Germany.

Niederholzklau was first mentioned in 1256. Until December 31, 1968, the village belonged as an independent municipality to the Amt Freudenberg. On 1 January 1969 Niederholzklau was renamed a district of the city of Freudenberg.

It borders the Freudenberg districts of Oberholzklau and Alchen and the Siegen district of Langenholdinghausen.

== Demographics ==
Niederholzklau has 189 inhabitants and is therefore the second smallest district of Freudenberg after Mausbach.

Historical population
Year	Pop.	±%
1818	54	—
1885	54	+0.0%
1895	49	−9.3%
1905	40	−18.4%
1910	39	−2.5%
1925	45	+15.4%
1933	56	+24.4%
1939	60	+7.1%
1950	88	+46.7%
1961	77	−12.5%
1967	91	+18.2%
1994	169	+85.7%
2000	156	−7.7%
2008	160	+2.6%
2010	159	−0.6%
2011	165	+3.8%
2013	175	+6.1%
2016	186	+6.3%
