= Simon Rock =

German politician (born 1988)

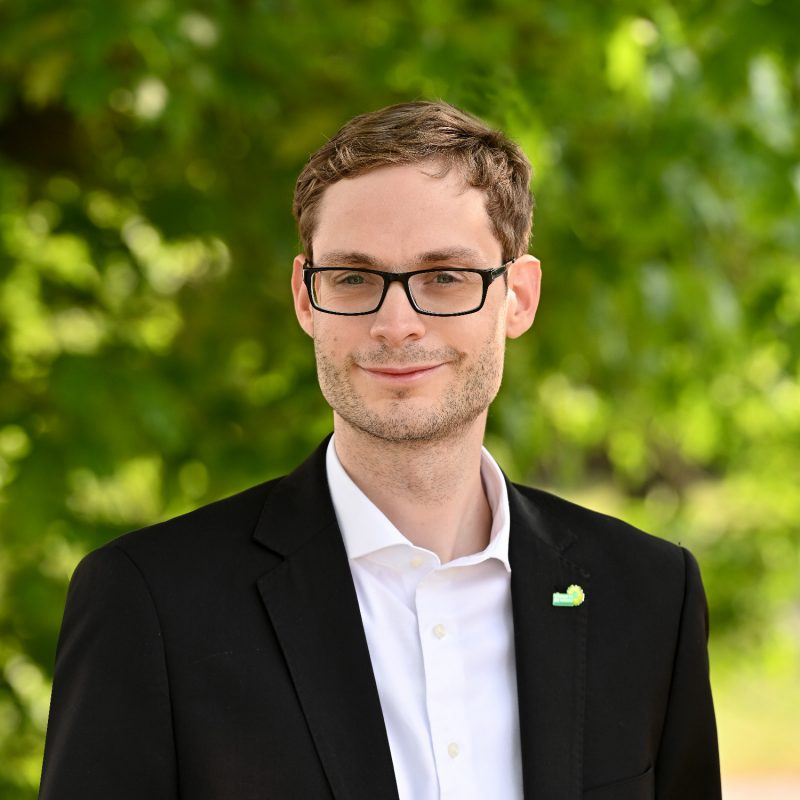
- Rock in 2021

Member of the Landtag of North Rhine-Westphalia
- Incumbent
- Assumed office 1 June 2022

Personal details
- Born: 22 June 1988 (age 37)
- Party: Alliance 90/The Greens (since 2004)
- Parent: Helga Rock (mother)

Simon Josef Rock (born 22 June 1988) is a German politician serving as a member of the Landtag of North Rhine-Westphalia since 2022. He is the son of Helga Rock.
