= KulturPur =

Coordinates: 50°58′27″N 8°09′14″E

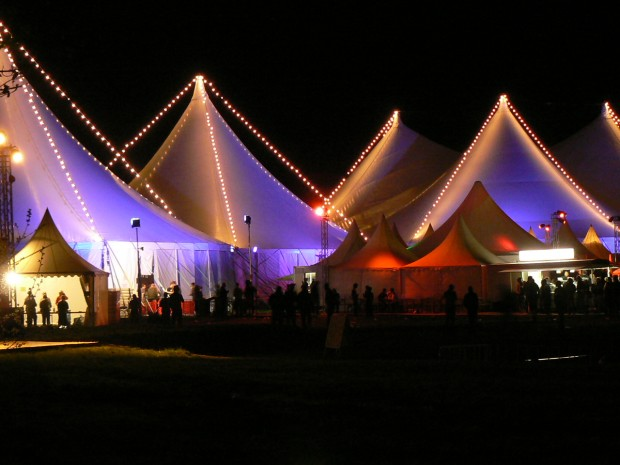

KulturPur is a theatre festival in Germany. Geographically, the Ginsberger Heide belongs to the district Grund of the town Hilchenbach, however, an approach by car is only possible via Hilchenbach-Lützel. During the festival, special buses go from all towns and communities of the district to the Giller and back.
