= Sauerländischer Gebirgsverein =

Hiking club

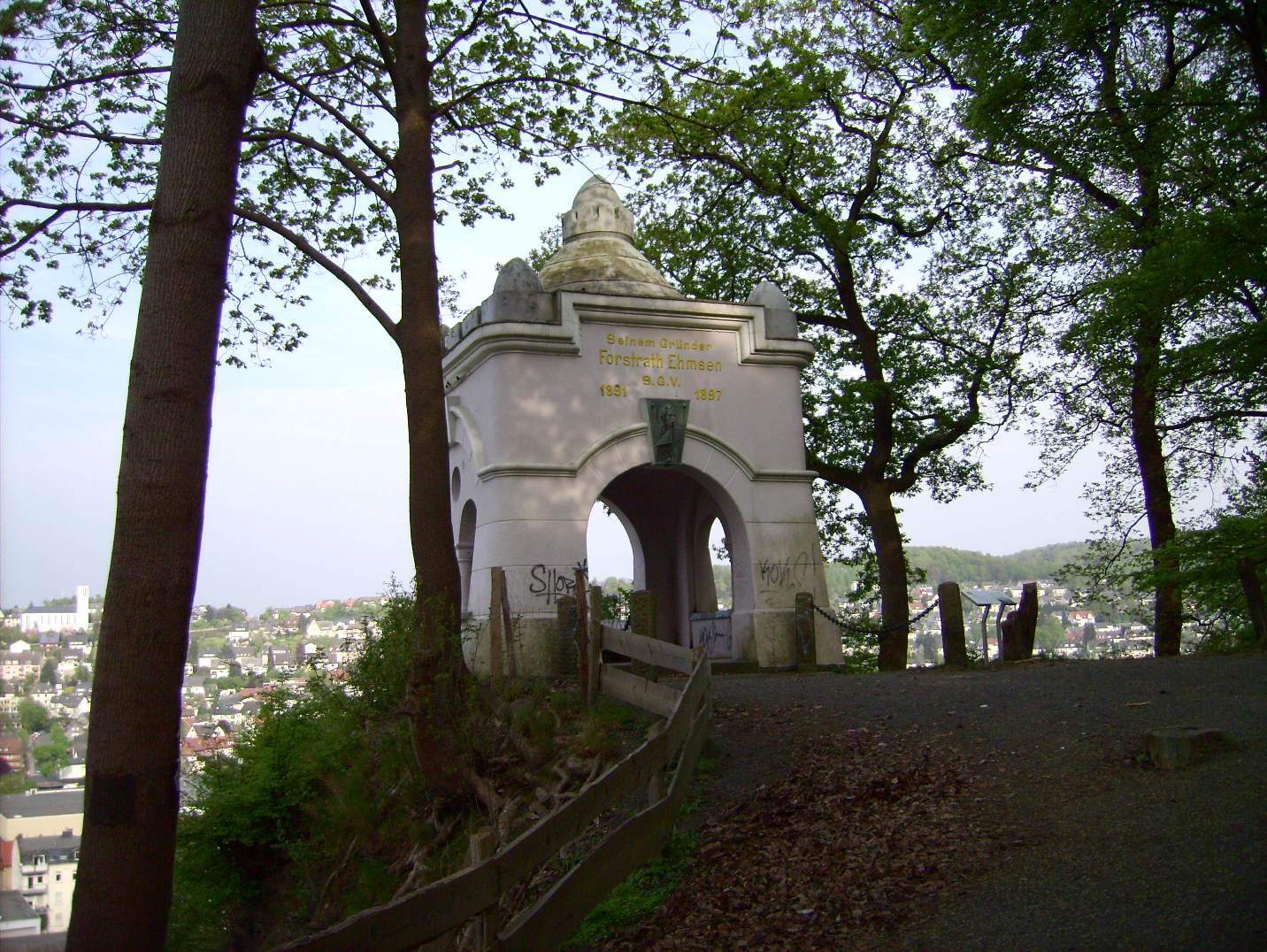
Ehmsen Memorial in Arnsberg

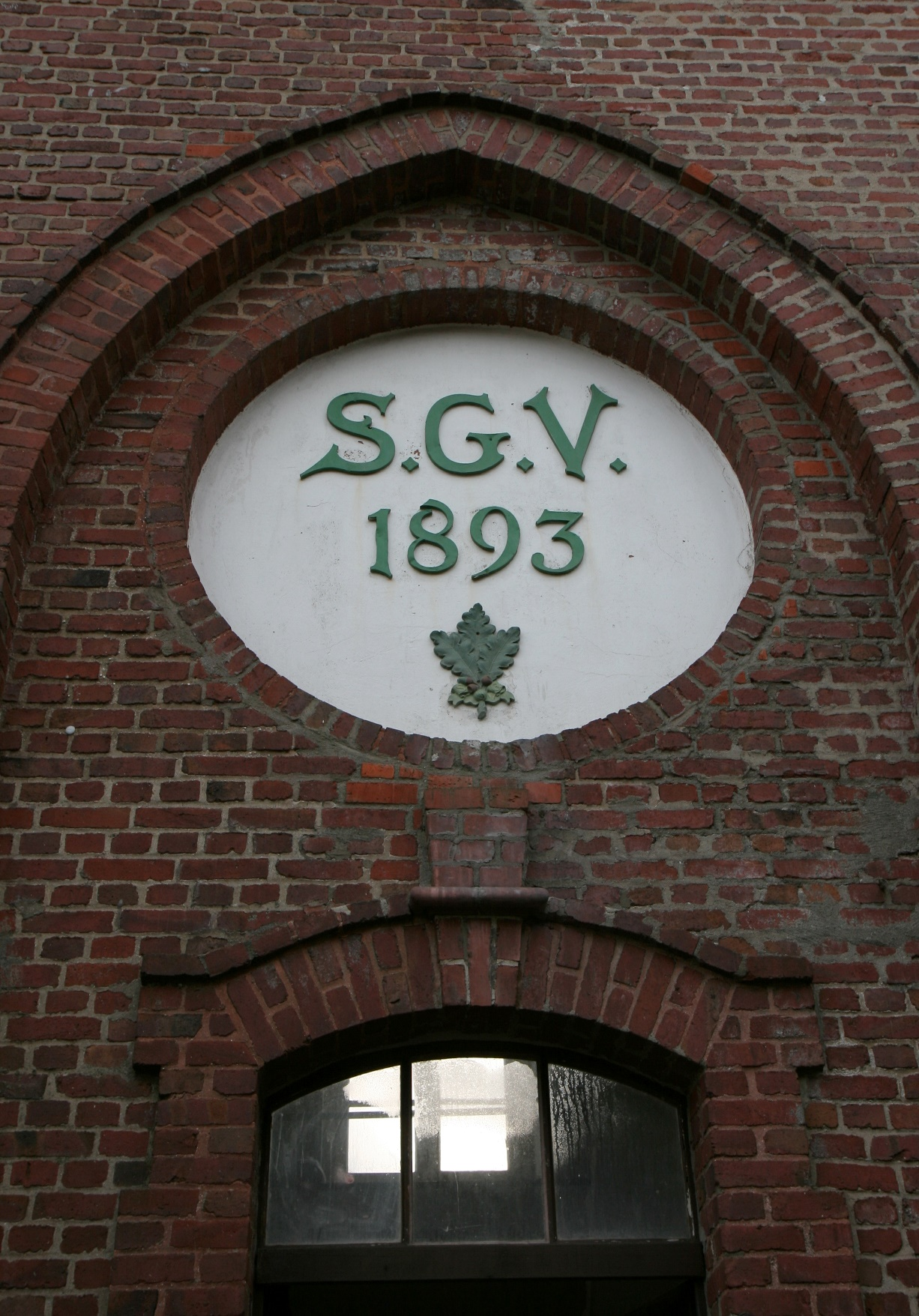
Observation tower Karlshöhe in Halver.

The "Sauerland Mountain Association", (Sauerländischer Gebirgsverein, briefly "SGV") is an association for hiking and Nordic Walking in the Sauerland area in Germany.

It was founded in 1891 by forest administrator Ernst Ehmsen and local historian Karl Féaux de Lacroix from Arnsberg (Sauerland) and has about 50,000 members. The Association organises events and is involved in the area of the nature conservation.

The association takes care of numerous footpathes and trails, for instance the Rothaarsteig, the Sauerland-Höhenflug (in German) and the Ruhrhöhenweg (in German), and marks them with signs on behalf of the nature preservation authorities of the state Northrhine-Westphalia. The length of the trails is altogether about 34,000 km, 4,300 km of these are classified as long distance trails. The association also cares about areas outside the Sauerland, namely the Ruhr valley area, the Münsterland, the Bergisches Land and the Siegerland.

For its members, the SGV publishes the magazine "Kreuz & Quer" (four times the year) with a circulation of 46,000 copies. Editor in chief is the Iserlohn-based journalist Thomas Reunert. In October, 2006 the delegates elected the head of the district authority of the Märkischer Kreis, Aloys Steppuhn, as president of the SGV.

== Literature ==
- Walter Hostert: "Geschichte des Sauerländischen Gebirgsvereins - Idee und Tat - Gestern - Heute - Morgen". - In German. (History of the Sauerland mountain association - idea and action - Yesterday - Today - Tomorrow") Arnsberg 1966.
- Susanne Falk: "Der Sauerländische Gebirgsverein - Vielleicht sind wir die Modernen von übermorgen." - In German. (The Sauerland mountain association - Maybe we are the modernists from the day after tomorrow) Bouvier publishing, Bonn 1990, ISBN 3-416-80653-0.
