= WaldrichSiegen =

German manufacturer of heavy duty machine tools

WaldrichSiegen Werkzeugmaschinen GmbH
- Company type: GmbH (100% family-owned)
- Industry: Manufacturing
- Founded: 1840
- Headquarters: Siegen, Germany
- Area served: Worldwide
- Key people: Maximilian Thoma, Marco Tannert
- Products: Machine tools
- Number of employees: 320 (2021)
- Website: www.waldrichsiegen.com

WaldrichSiegen Werkzeugmaschinen GmbH is a German manufacturer of heavy duty machine tools in the product lines milling, turning, boring, grinding and texturing. The internationally operating company has production and service sites in the USA, in China and India. The Headquarter of the company is situated in Siegen, Germany.

== Company history ==
In 1840, Heinrich Adolf Waldrich founded Maschinenfabrik H.A. Waldrich in Siegen, which was part of the Prussian province Westphalia at that time. Initially, the company manufactured pumps, pulleys and fans for furnaces. The first steam engine was designed and manufactured in 1863, followed by the first turning machine. When the company founder Heinrich Adolf Waldrich died in 1879, his son of the same name took over the company management. During the following years, the company’s product portfolio was extended. The first roll lathe was manufactured in 1897, the production of the first roll grinders started in 1920. The company management was taken over by Oskar Waldrich, the grandson of the company founder, after the First World War. The number of employees was 20 at that time. Under his management, new markets were developed. E.g. Maschinenfabrik H.A. Waldrich delivered the first machines to Russia in 1927. During the Second World War, the production halls of the company were destroyed almost completely by bombing raids on Siegen in 1944. The product line of portal milling machines was launched in 1961, when the company merged with Ingersoll Milling Machine Co., USA. Ingersoll brought the milling technique that originally came from America to the European market. Therefore, Waldrich Siegen-Ingersoll GmbH was founded. A new production hall was needed for the manufacturing of the high performance portal milling machines, due to the size and weight of the machines. Thus, a new production site with tool machines was built on the greenfield in Burbach. After completing the new building in 1981, the company’s headquarter moved from Siegen to Burbach. WaldrichSiegen had been acquired by Ingersoll in 1971. Waldrich Coburg was integrated in the concern in 1986. After the insolvency of Ingersoll, USA, the companies WaldrichSiegen and Waldrich Coburg were acquired by the owner family of Maschinenfabrik Herkules in 2004. The owners decided to sell Waldrich Coburg again in 2005. Today, WaldrichSiegen Werkzeugmaschinen GmbH is an independent and autonomous company within the medium-sized and owner-managed HerkulesGroup. In the future, WaldrichSiegen is going to appear jointly on the market with UnionChemnitz, which has been part of the HerkulesGroup since June 2011.

== Developments ==
- Hydrostatical worm drives for turning and milling machines (1970)
- WaldrichSiegen master head concept (2009)

== Products ==
WaldrichSiegen manufactures machine tools used for machining rolls and housings of heavy marine diesel engines, crankshafts etc. The product portfolio contains:

- Milling machines
- Horizontal lathes
- Vertical lathes
- Horizontal boring machines
- Grinding machines
- Texturing machines

== Literature ==
- Fickeler, Paul (1955), Waldrich Siegen: 1840-1955: Zur Geschichte der Stadt Siegen und des deutschen Werkzeugmaschinenbaues: Festschrift E. H. Oskar Waldrich zum 75. Geburtstag (in German), Siegen
- Waldrich, Siegen, Grosswerkzeugmaschinen: Festschrift für Oskar Waldrich, Dr. -Ing. Ehrenhalber der Technischen Hochschule Karlsruhe, Ehrenbürger der Technischen Hochschule Aachen, zu seinem 80. Geburtstag am 3. Juni 1960 (in German), Siegen, 1960
