= Wigand Siebel =

German sociologist

Wigand Siebel (born 4 January 1929 in Freudenberg, Westphalia, died 29 August 2014) was a German sociologist.

== Scientific career ==
After his graduation, Siebel worked for the Social Research Center of Dortmund. In 1964, he was appointed a lecturer at the Ruhr University in Bochum. In 1965, he was appointed Professor of Sociology at the University of the Saarlands in Saarbrücken.

The following is his academic timeline:

1. Studied in Kiel, Munich and Münster.
2. 1955-1959: Fellow at the Institute for Christian Social Sciences in Münster.
3. 1955: Received his Doctorate in Political Science at Münster.
4. 1955-1959: Publishing Company of Freiburg
5. 1959-1964: Fellow of Social Research at the University of Münster in Dortmund.
6. 1964: Promotion to academic status in Münster
7. Since 1965: Full Professor at Saarbrücken

He is the Emeritus Professor of Sociology at the University of Saarland.

== Life ==
Siebel was raised an Evangelical Protestant and converted to Catholicism a short time before Vatican II. As a Conservative Christian, he became involved with the Catholic Traditionalist movement resisting the adoption of the Modernist ideas into Catholicism as a result of the Aggiornamento and Vatican II.

== Controversy ==
The French Traditionalist priest, George de Nantes wrote in his The Catholic Counter-Reformation in the XXth Century, #220, June 1989, page 20, para 1 & 2 that Wigand Siebel and his followers teach that, with the Modernist apostasy, the Catholic Papacy has ceased to be or that it has come to an end, a teaching which contradicts Catholic teaching that is strongly emphasised.
