= Burbach, North Rhine-Westphalia =

Burbach
- Municipality
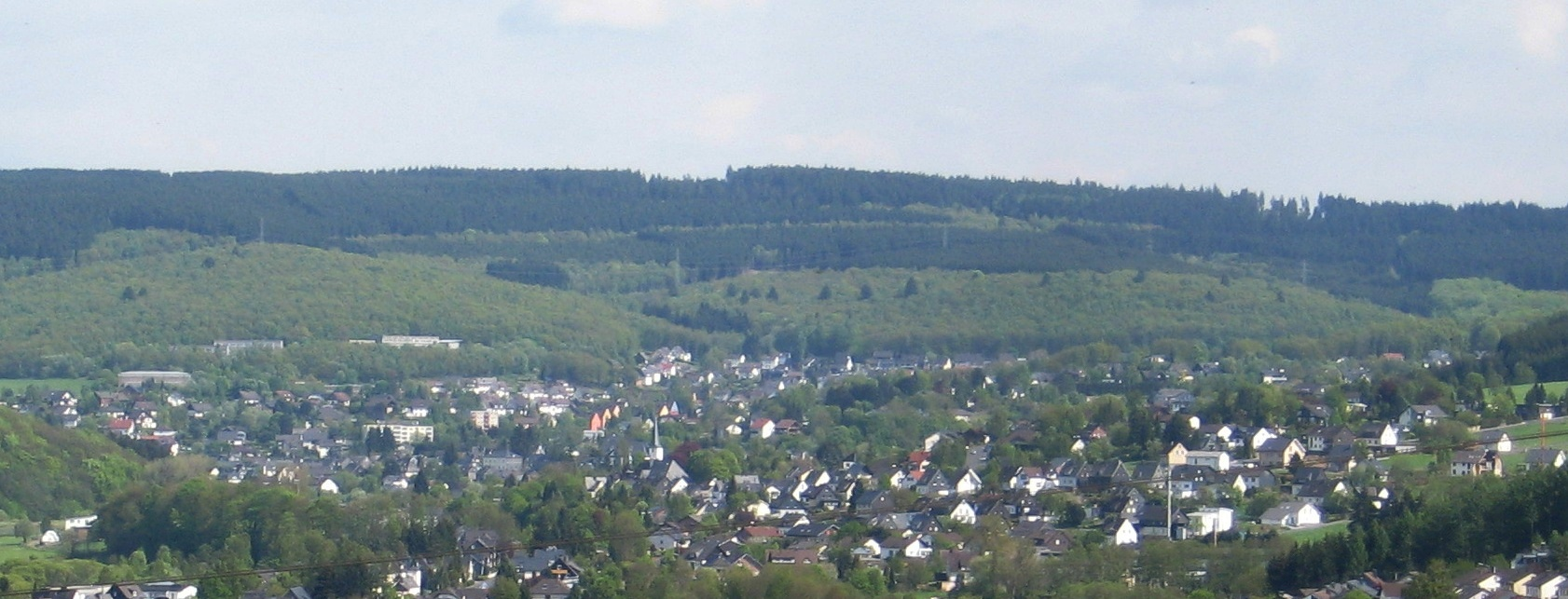
- Burbach seen from the northwest

- Coat of arms

- Location of Burbach within Siegen-Wittgenstein district
- Interactive map of Burbach
- Location within Germany Location within North Rhine-Westphalia
- Coordinates: 50°44′40″N 8°05′10″E
- Country: Germany
- State: North Rhine-Westphalia
- Admin. region: Arnsberg
- District: Siegen-Wittgenstein
- Subdivisions: 9

Government
  - Mayor (2025–30): Jonas Becker (CDU)

Area
  - Total: 79.72 km^{2} (30.78 sq mi)
- Elevation: 365 m (1,198 ft)

Population (2025-12-31)
  - Total: 14,293
  - Density: 179.3/km^{2} (464.4/sq mi)
- Time zone: UTC+01:00 (CET)
  - Summer (DST): UTC+02:00 (CEST)
- Postal codes: 57299
- Dialling codes: 02736
- Vehicle registration: SI
- Website: www.burbach-siegerland.de

Burbach (German pronunciation: [ˈbuːɐ̯bax]) is a municipality in the Siegen-Wittgenstein district, in North Rhine-Westphalia, Germany.

== Geography ==
Burbach is located in Siegen-Wittgenstein district on the river Heller, about 15 km south of Siegen. Burbach also is a community in the southern part of the state Northrhine Westphalia.

=== Constituent divisions ===
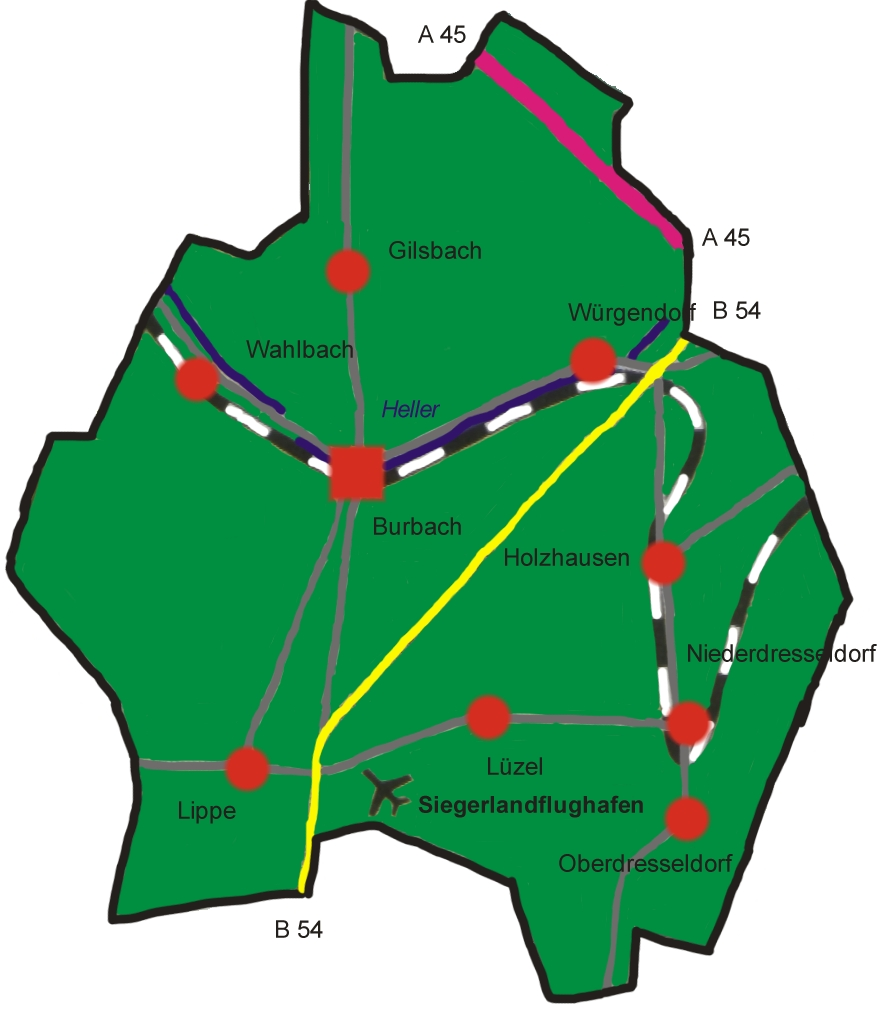
Constituent communities

The community of Burbach consists of the following subdivisions: Burbach, Gilsbach, Holzhausen, Lippe, Lützeln, Niederdresselndorf, Oberdresselndorf, Wahlbach, Würgendorf.

== Population ==
Historical population

Year	Pop.	±% p.a.
1965	12,107	—
1970	13,192	+1.73%
1975	13,611	+0.63%
1980	13,513	−0.14%
1985	13,168	−0.52%
1990	14,017	+1.26%
1995	14,807	+1.10%

Year	Pop.	±% p.a.
2000	15,064	+0.34%
2005	14,872	−0.26%
2010	14,443	−0.58%
2015	14,969	+0.72%
2020	14,913	−0.07%
2025	14,293	−0.85%

Source: Landesdatabank Nordrhein-Westfalen

== Politics ==
=== Municipal council ===
The council's 32 seats are apportioned thus, in accordance with municipal elections held on 14 September 2025:

- CDU 16 seats
- SPD 7 seats
- Greens 3 seats
- FDP 1 seat
- Independent Voters' Association of Burbach 5 seats

=== Coat of arms ===
Burbach's civic coat of arms might heraldically be described thus: Party per pale, dexter in azure spangled with billets Or a two-tailed lion rampant Or armed and langued gules, sinister in Or three lozenges sable arranged vertically.

The lion stands for the princely House of Nassau-Siegen. The three lozenges (diamonds) come from the Lords of Seelbach, who held sway over the community in the Middle Ages.

The current civic coat of arms is based on the now abolished Amt's arms, and was granted in 1970. The local court for Burbach and Seelbach was already using the combination of a lion and diamonds by the 15th century.

== Economy and infrastructure ==
=== Transport ===
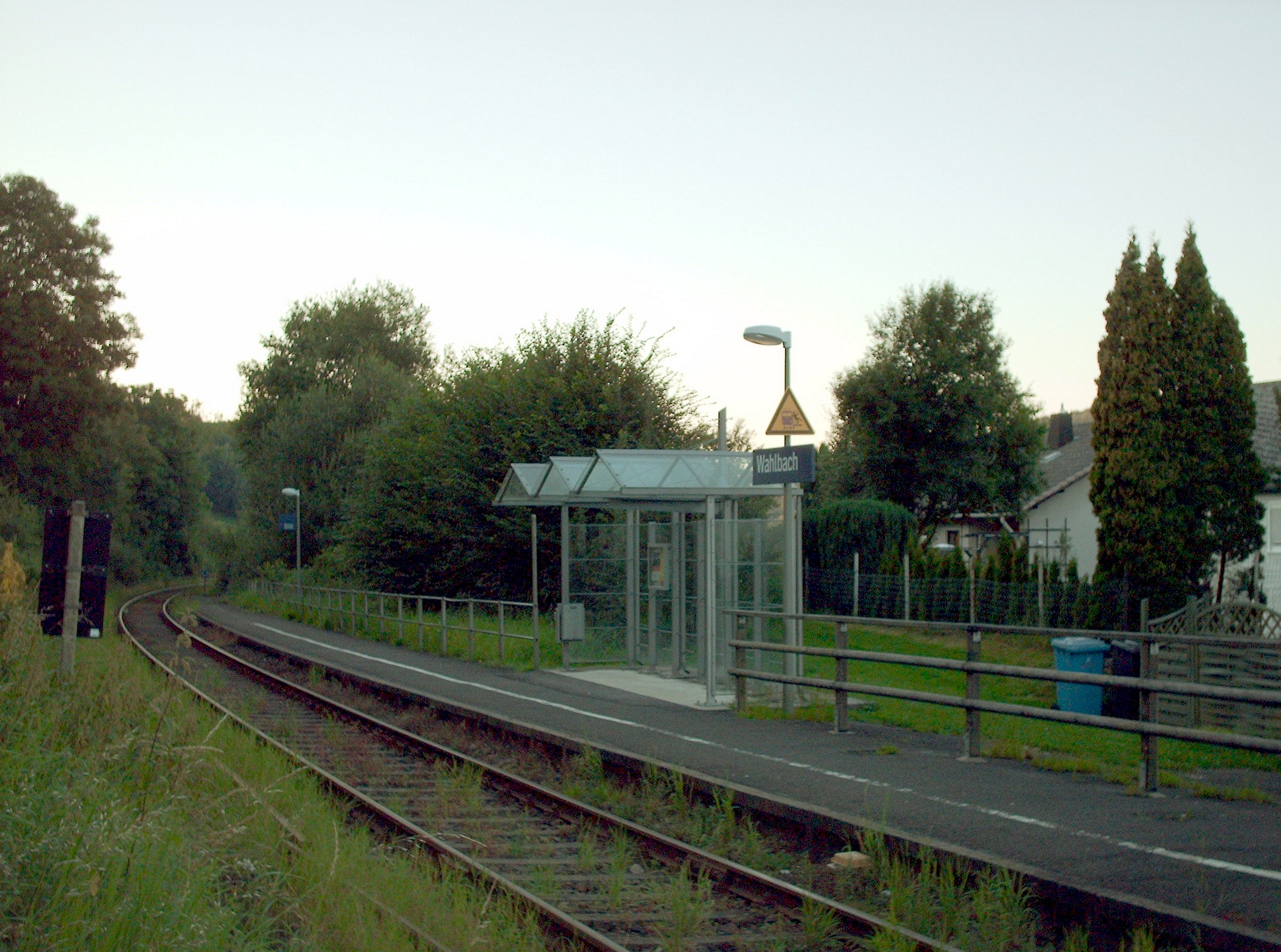
Wahlbach stop

Burbach has five stations along the Betzdorf–Haiger railway, in the districts Wahlbach, Burbach, Würgendorf, Holzhausen and Niederdresselnbach, they are served by the local train line number RB96 of Hessische Landesbahn, section DreiLänderBahn. Burbach is located in the fare association Westfalen-Tarif, in the zones number 82002, 82003 and 82004. Also local bus lines connect Burbach to the public transport.

Running through the northeast of the municipal area is Autobahn A 45 (Sauerlandlinie). As well, the municipal area is connected in the east to Federal Highway (Bundesstraße) B 54, which runs from Siegen towards Limburg an der Lahn.

In the southern municipal area lies the Siegerland Airport.

=== Established businesses ===
Well known businesses in Burbach are:

- Expert Klein
- Foto-Drogerie-Kosmetik Bräuer
- Georgi Transporte
- Hering Bau (tracklaying)
- Heusel Kälte- und Klimatechnik
- SOPREMA-KLEWA Dachbaustoffe
- MHP Mannesmann Präzisrohr
- Orica, Werk Würgendorf (formerly Dynamit Nobel AG)
- razorcom it service
- Rittal
- WaldrichSiegen
- IPG Photonics

== Notable people ==
Notable people associated with the town include:

- Christian Dünnes (* 1984), German former volleyball player
- Cem Islamoglu (* 1980), Turkish-German football player
- Wilhelm Killing (1847–1923), mathematician
- Volkmar Klein (* 1960), German politician
- Dirk Müller (* 1975), racing driver
- Hermann Schmidt (1917–1983), German politician
- Markus Waldrich, German football player
