= Volkmar Klein =

German politician (born 1960)

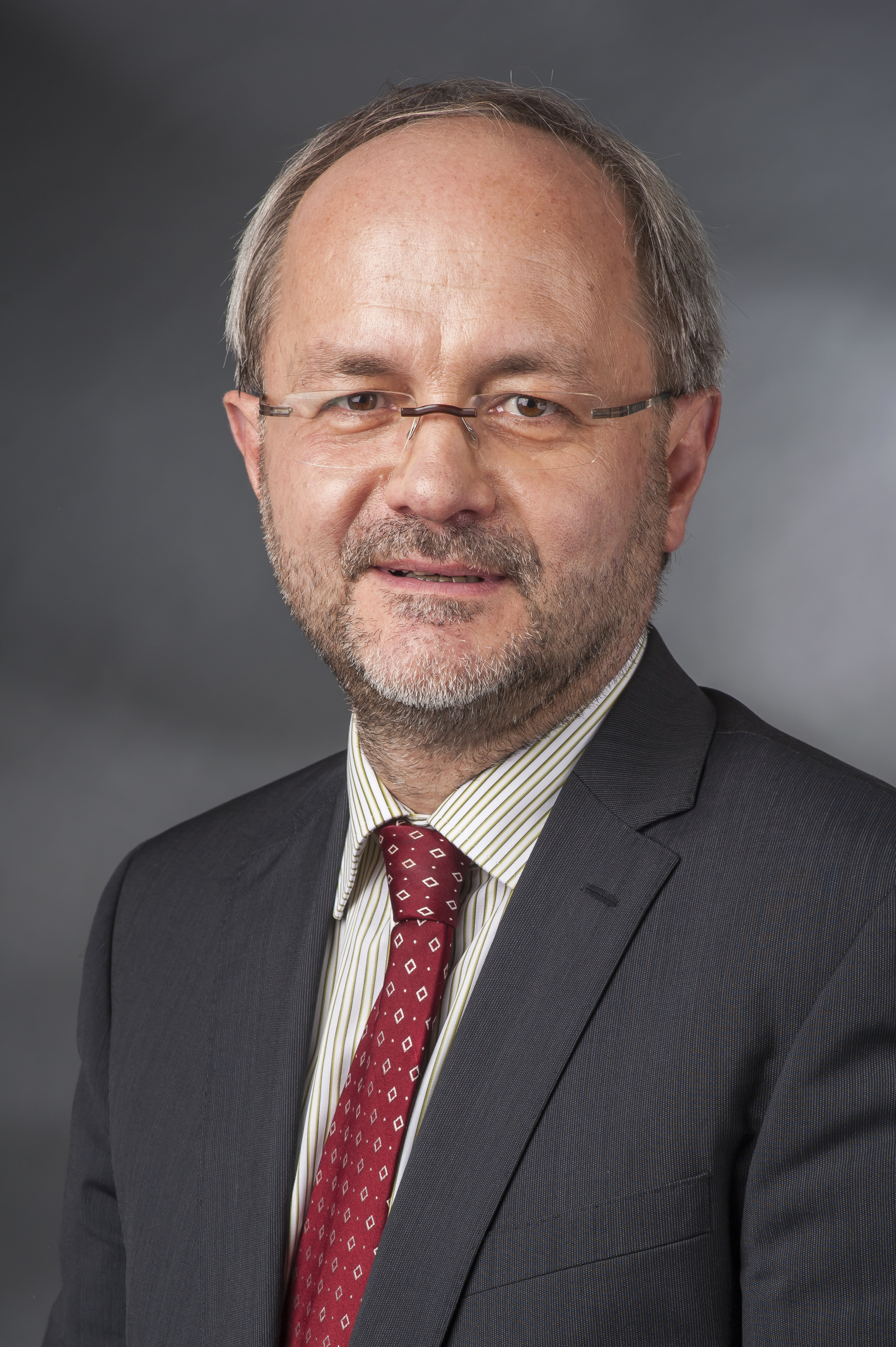
- Portrait of Klein

Member of the Bundestag for Siegen-Wittgenstein
- In office 2009–2025

Personal details
- Born: 13 January 1960 (age 66) Siegen, West Germany (now Germany)
- Party: Christian Democratic Union
- Education: University of Bonn

Volkmar Klein (born 13 January 1960 in Siegen, North Rhine-Westphalia) is a German politician of the Christian Democratic Union (CDU) who served as a member of the German Bundestag from 2009 to 2025 and as a member of the Landtag of North Rhine-Westphalia from 1995 to 2009.

== Early life and education ==
Parallel to his studies in the University of Bonn, Klein worked as an assistant to a member of the German Bundestag. In 1986, Klein finished his studies in the University of Bonn as a graduate economist and took on a several month internship in the consulting company Henkell Brothers in Melbourne, Australia.

After returning to Germany, Klein continued working for the same Australian consulting company as a freelancer. From 1988 until 1989, Klein was the branch manager of another Australian company Exicom Ltd (electronic company) in Düsseldorf. From 1989 until 1995, Klein was the executive manager of the Wittgensteiner Kuranstalt GmbH & Co. KG, an operator of rehabilitation clinics and hospitals in Germany and the Czech Republic.

== Political career ==
=== Career in state politics ===
In 1978, Klein became a member of the CDU. He has been a member of the federal board of the CDU since 2001 and the chairman of the CDU in the district of Siegen-Wittgenstein since 2003.

From 2004 until 2015 he was the chairman of the federal board of the Protestant Working Group of the CDU in North Rhine-Westphalia. From 1984 until 2005, he was a member of the council of the Burbach municipality and from 1992 until 1996, he was the mayor of this municipality.

Klein was a member of the Landtag of North Rhine-Westphalia from 1995 until 2009, where, in the 14th legislative period, he was a member of the Budget control committee, Budget committee, Finance committee and the Subcommittee of the Budget- and Finance committee "Personnel“. Besides that he was the speaker of his party in the Budget and Finance committees.

=== Member of the German Parliament, 2009–2025 ===
In the 2009 national elections, Klein was directly elected with 41.53% votes into the German Parliament, followed by 45.8% votes in the federal election in 2013. In his first two legislative terms in the German Parliament, he served on the Budget Committee and the Subcommittee on European Union issues. He also was a member of the parliament's financial market committee, a committee that monitored the federal bank rescue package worth 480 billion euros passed on 17 October 2008 and advised on fundamental and strategic issues as well as long-term developments in financial market policy.

In 2017, Klein was directly elected with 40,13% votes into the German Bundestag. In the 19th legislative period of the German Parliament, he chaired the Economic Cooperation and Development Task Force of the CDU/CSU parliamentary group. He was a member of the Committee on Economic Cooperation and Development, a deputy member of the Budget Committee and deputy member of the Committee on Foreign Affairs.

In addition to his committee assignments, Klein chaired the German-Pacific Parliamentary Friendship Group of the German Bundestag.

In July 2023, Klein announced that he would not stand in the 2025 federal elections but instead resign from active politics by the end of the parliamentary term.

== Other activities ==
- German Network against Neglected Tropical Diseases (DNTDs), Member of the Parliamentary Advisory Board (since 2018)
- University of Siegen, Member of the Board of Trustees
- German Africa Foundation, Member of the Board
- Friends of the Siegerland Airport Dreiländereck, Member of the Board
- Foundation for Basic Values and International Understanding, Deputy Chairman
- Central Council of Oriental Christians in Germany, deputy chairman of the Advisory Board
- Development and Peace Foundation (SEF), Member of the Board of Trustees
- German Foundation for World Population (DSW), Member of the Parliamentary Advisory Board
- GIZ, Member of the supervisory board (until 2018)

== Personal life ==
Klein is married and has four children. He lives in the town of Burbach.
