= Oberholzklau =

- Ortsteil of Freudenberg
- Interactive map of Oberholzklau
- Location within Germany Location within North Rhine-Westphalia
- Coordinates: 50°55′34.541032″N 07°56′3.620567″E
- Country: Germany
- State: North Rhine-Westphalia
- Admin. region: Arnsberg
- District: Siegen-Wittgenstein
- Town: Freudenberg
- Founded: 1079

Area
  - Total: 1.6 km^{2} (0.62 sq mi)
- Elevation: 359 m (1,178 ft)
- Time zone: UTC+01:00 (CET)
  - Summer (DST): UTC+02:00 (CEST)
- Postal codes: 57258
- Dialling codes: 02734
- Vehicle registration: SI
- Website: Faltblatt der Stadt

Oberholzklau is a constituent community of Freudenberg, Siegen-Wittgenstein, North Rhine-Westphalia, Germany.

The first documentary mention of the village under the name of Holzeclaen dates from 1079, the parish of Oberholzklau was first mentioned in 1329.

The district currently has 622 inhabitants. It borders the Freudenberg districts of Niederholzklau and Bühl as well as the Siegen district of Meiswinkel. The road L 564 leads through the village.

On January 1, 1969 Oberholzklau became a district of the city of Freudenberg.
