= Theodor Siebel =

German politician

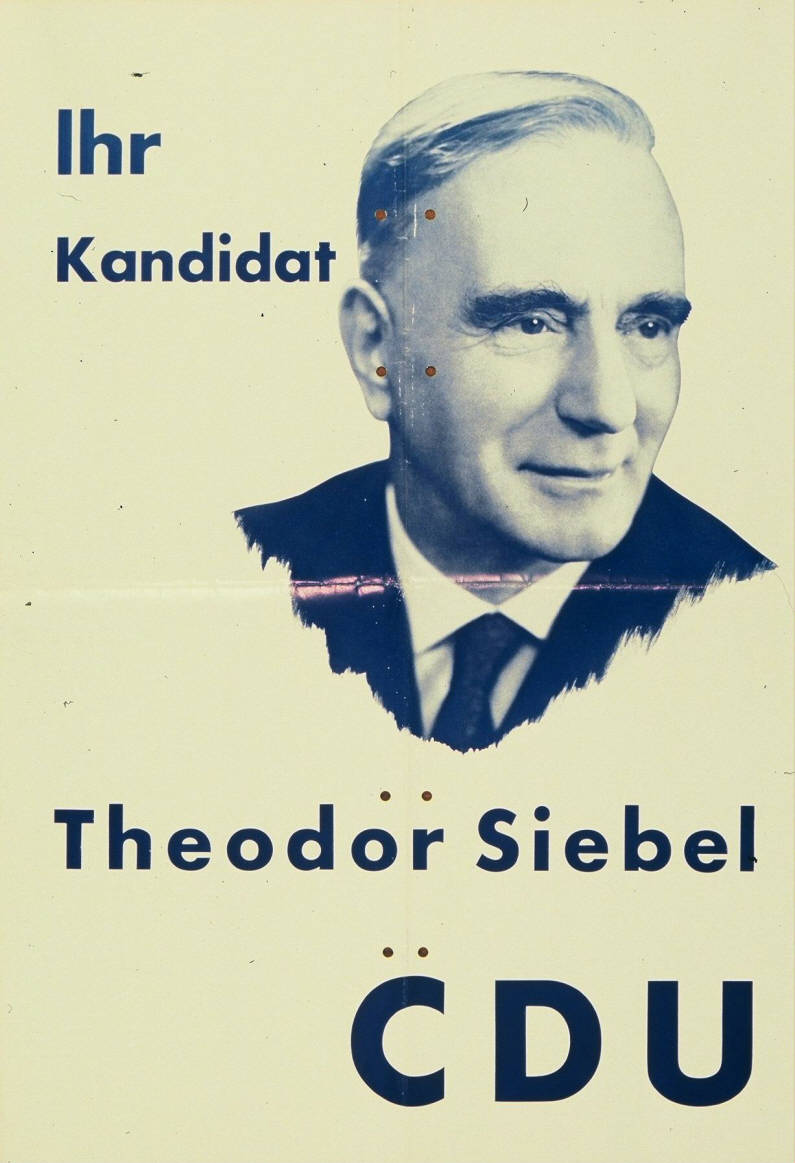
- Theodor Siebel on a campaign poster for the 1961 federal elections

Member of the Bundestag
- In office 7 September 1949 – 15 October 1961

Personal details
- Born: 16 January 1897
- Died: 14 September 1975 (aged 78)
- Party: CDU

Theodor Siebel (January 16, 1897 – September 14, 1975) was a German politician of the Christian Democratic Union (CDU) and former member of the German Bundestag.

== Life ==
Siebel joined the CDU in 1945 and was chairman of the Siegerland district CDU association. After 1945 he was a member of the district council of Siegen. He was a member of the German Bundestag from 1949 to 1961. In parliament he represented the constituency of Siegen-Stadt und -Land, in which he was always directly elected and in 1957 even with an absolute majority of 51.4% of the first votes. From 1953 to 1957 he was deputy chairman of the Bundestag Committee for Postal and Telecommunications Affairs.

== Literature ==
Herbst, Ludolf; Jahn, Bruno (2002). Vierhaus, Rudolf (ed.). Biographisches Handbuch der Mitglieder des Deutschen Bundestages. 1949–2002 [Biographical Handbook of the Members of the German Bundestag. 1949–2002] (in German). München: De Gruyter - De Gruyter Saur. p. 1715. ISBN 978-3-11-184511-1.
