= Freudenberg, Westphalia =

Freudenberg
- Town
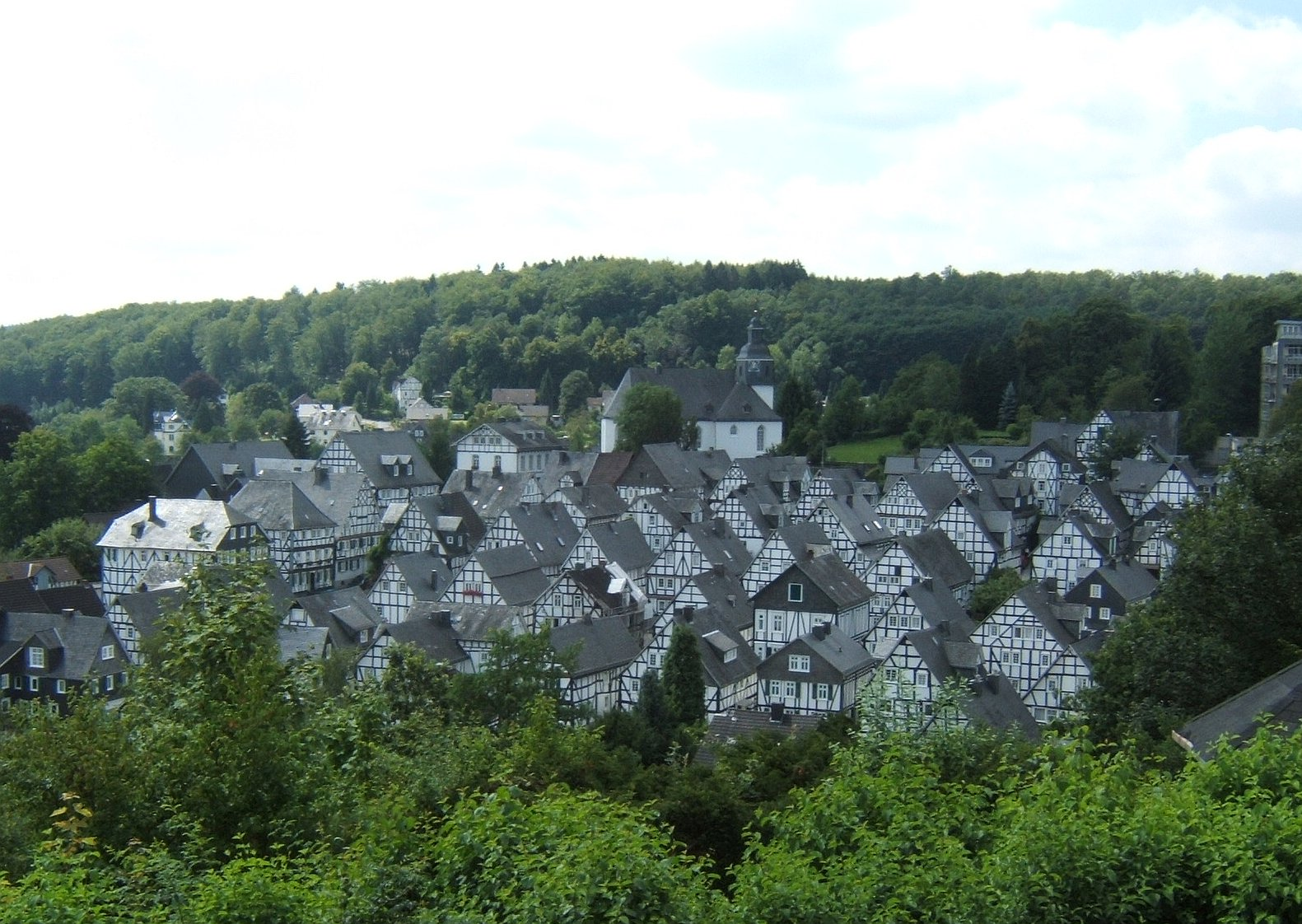
- The Alter Flecken, Freudenberg's historic core

- Coat of arms

- Location of Freudenberg within Siegen-Wittgenstein district
- Interactive map of Freudenberg
- Location within Germany Location within North Rhine-Westphalia
- Coordinates: 50°53′59″N 07°52′00″E
- Country: Germany
- State: North Rhine-Westphalia
- Admin. region: Arnsberg
- District: Siegen-Wittgenstein
- Subdivisions: 17

Government
  - Mayor (2020–25): Nicole Reschke (SPD)

Area
  - Total: 54.6 km^{2} (21.1 sq mi)
- Elevation: 330 m (1,080 ft)

Population (2025-12-31)
  - Total: 17,192
  - Density: 315/km^{2} (816/sq mi)
- Time zone: UTC+01:00 (CET)
  - Summer (DST): UTC+02:00 (CEST)
- Postal codes: 57258
- Dialling codes: 02734
- Vehicle registration: SI
- Website: www.freudenberg-stadt.de

Freudenberg (pronounced [ˈfʁɔʏdn̩ˌbɛʁk]) is a town in the Siegen-Wittgenstein district, in North Rhine-Westphalia, Germany.

The town lies on the German-Dutch holiday road called the Orange Route, joining towns, cities and regions associated with the House of Orange.

== Geography ==
=== Location ===
Freudenberg lies in hilly uplands between 243 and 505 m above sea level. The 17 constituent communities share roughly 55 km^{2}, of which two thirds is made up of broadleaf and spruce forest.

=== Constituent communities ===
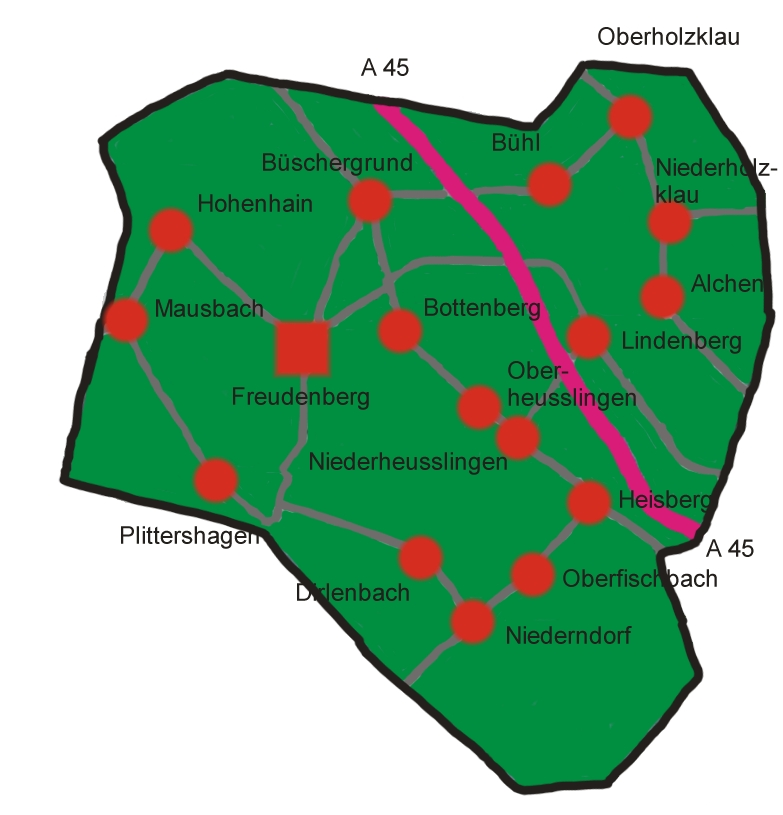
Constituent communities

Besides the main town, which bears the same name as the whole municipality, there are sixteen outlying centres named Alchen, Bottenberg, Bühl, Büschergrund, Dirlenbach, Heisberg, Hohenhain, Lindenberg, Mausbach, Niederheuslingen, Niederholzklau, Niederndorf, Oberfischbach, Oberheuslingen, Oberholzklau and Plittershagen. Among these, the main town is the biggest, and the next in size after that is Büschergrund, which is itself further subdivided into four parts, named Büschen, Eichen, Anstoß and Bockseifen.

== History ==
The town of Freudenberg in its current form came into being through municipal reform on 1 January 1969. Into it the seventeen formerly self-standing municipalities of Alchen, Bottenberg, Bühl, Büschergrund, Dirlenbach, Freudenberg, Heisberg, Hohenhain, Lindenberg, Mausbach, Niederheuslingen, Niederholzklau, Niederndorf, Oberfischbach, Oberheuslingen, Oberholzklau and Plittershagen were merged into one.

The oldest constituent communities are most likely the two that were both mentioned in documents in the 11th century, namely Plittershagen and Oberholzklau in 1079. Freudenberg is known to have been an Amt and court seat as of the early 15th century. The village and the castle of Freudenberg had their first documentary mention in 1389.

The castle was founded over the Weibe Valley together with a settlement by the Counts of Nassau as a corner post of their domain. Count Johann IV of Nassau, Vianden and Diez gave the Freudenberg townsfolk their "freedom rights" on 7 November 1456. This was a kind of minimal town rights, but the document bestowing this distinction upon the town is taken as evidence of town rights being granted Freudenberg. Documents give clues that Freudenberg was established quite early on as a "Flecken", or market town. The historic town core is even still called Alter Flecken (alt means "old"; –er is a grammatical inflection).

In 1540, both the castle and the town were heavily damaged by a fire. On William the Rich's orders, there came into being about the mid 16th century new building works. The market town was given a new town wall with four gates. In the northwest, the Hohenhainer Tor was built, in the northeast the Weihertor, in the southeast the Braastor and in the southwest the Schultor (Tor means "gate"). However, owing to yet another town fire on 9 August 1666, the town was once again laid waste. Prince Johann Moritz von Nassau-Siegen built the town anew, using much the same layout, planned in 1540, as had stood before the fire. The castle, however, was not restored, and to this day, all that can be seen of it are a few wall remains.

In 1969, the new, greater Freudenberg came into being with the merger of the seventeen former municipalities named herein.

== Population ==
Historical population

Year	Pop.	±% p.a.
1965	13,068	—
1970	14,294	+1.81%
1975	15,346	+1.43%
1980	15,844	+0.64%
1985	16,081	+0.30%
1990	17,079	+1.21%
1995	18,094	+1.16%

Year	Pop.	±% p.a.
2000	18,328	+0.26%
2005	18,562	+0.25%
2010	18,392	−0.18%
2015	17,929	−0.51%
2020	17,729	−0.22%
2025	17,192	−0.61%

Source: Landesdatabank Nordrhein-Westfalen

== Politics ==
=== Town council ===
The town council is elected roughly every 5 years. Its composition is listed below:

	SPD	CDU	Greens	FDP	independent	total
2020	14	11	6	3	0	34
2014	14	12	3	2	3	34
2009	12	14	3	3	2	34
2004	11	17	2	2	2	34

=== Coat of arms ===
The charge in Freudenberg's civic coat of arms is variously interpreted as a castle or a town gate. If the later is the case, it might heraldically be described thus: In azure a crenellated town gate Or with two crenellated towers Or. In either case, the town's current arms, granted in 1911 and confirmed in 1970, are based on the town's oldest known seal, from 1473. This seal's colours were not known; the blue and gold seen today are the colours of the old princely house of Nassau-Siegen.

=== Town partnerships ===
- Mór, Hungary, arising from youth exchanges.

== Culture and sightseeing ==
=== Theatre ===
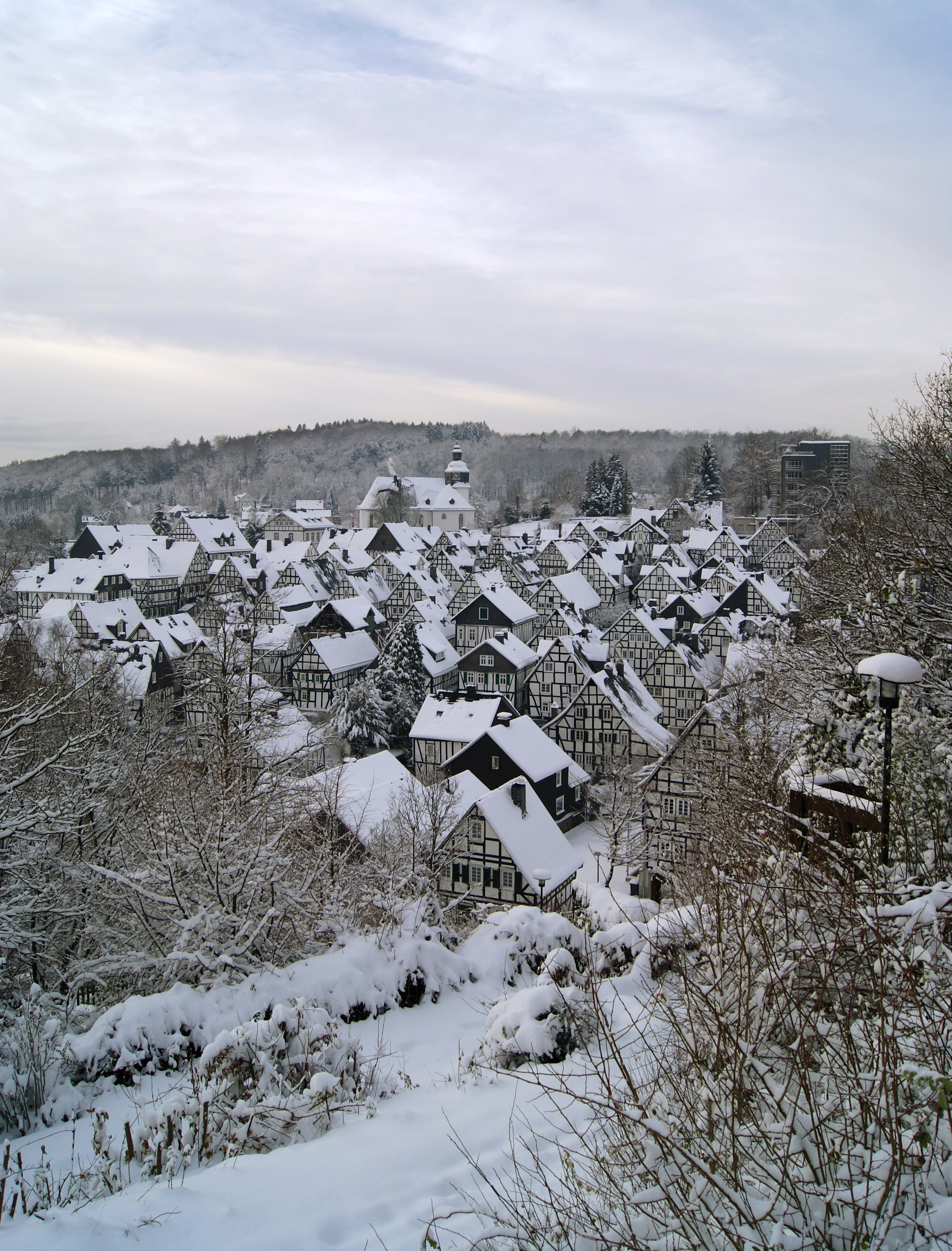
Freudenberg

At the Südwestfälische Freilichtbühne Freudenberg (Freudenberg South Westphalian Open-air Stage), before a breathtaking backdrop of forest and crags, two new productions are staged every year for children and adults. Yearly, about 50,000 visitors come to the open-air stage with its roofed grandstand.

=== Museums ===
The town museum (Stadtmuseum) has exhibits relating to local history and economic history. Especially worth seeing is the House's clock collection. The Technical Museum (Technikmuseum) has on display exhibits relating to trade and industrial history from the region. The museum's centrepiece is a steam engine built in 1904. As well, the museum has a variety of wheeled vehicles on display.

=== Buildings ===
The "Alter Flecken" is Freudenberg's downtown core, built wholly of half-timbered houses. It gives the impression of a small town from the 17th century. The Alter Flecken was included in the Kulturatlas des Landes Nordrhein-Westfalen (Cultural Atlas of the State of North Rhine-Westphalia) as a "Building monument of international importance". The Evangelical church, after Freudenberg got its own parish in 1585, was built as a "fortress church" (i.e. with architecture somewhat reminiscent of a military fortification). The belltower is the only one of the former castle's towers still left standing.

The church in Oberholzklau was built early in the 13th century and is worth seeing as a Romanesque church whose architecture nevertheless plainly shows transition to Gothic. The rectory next door, built in half-timbered style, is from 1608.

=== Film backdrop ===
The prim and proper seeming town has served in, among others, Detlev Buck's film Bundle of Joy as an allegory of a decent, middle-class small town in which behind the scenes things stink. Likewise, the town served as the backdrop in the film Lupo und der Muezzin (Diana Film, Munich).

== Economy and infrastructure ==
The town is crossed from north to southeast by Autobahn A 45. Until the 1980s, there was also a railway connection through the Biggetalbahn to Olpe in the north and through the Asdorftalbahn to Betzdorf in the south. Nowadays, a great deal of the former right-of-way has been turned into bicycle trails or filled in with earth. Freudenberg is located in the fare association Westfalen-Tarif.

== Personalities ==
Former mayor Hermann Vomhof is at this time Freudenberg's only honorary citizen. Freudenberg is the ancestral village of Apollo XI Astronaut Buzz Aldrin, a descendant of Freudenberg Burgermeister Jacob Friesenhagen, circa 1660.

=== Sons and daughters of the city ===
- Wigand Siebel (1929-2014), sociologist
- Hans-Ulrich Wehler (1931-2014), historian
- Sven Michel (born 1990), footballer
