= Naissus (see) =

Former Roman Catholic diocese in Serbia

Naissus was an ancient city and former bishopric in Balkanic Dacia, which remains a Latin Catholic titular see.

== History ==
Naissus, today's Niš in Serbia, was important enough in the Roman province of Dacia Mediterranea to become an episcopal see at an early date and was a suffragan of the Metropolitan see in the Archdiocese of Sardica, in the sway of the Patriarchate of Constantinople.

The city was wrecked by Attila's Huns but rebuilt, as the revival of the bishopric attests.

=== Residential bishops ===
The names of several of early Suffragan Bishops of Naissus are known:

- Cyriacus (first half of the 4th century), sympathized with the heresy Arianism and opposed Marcellus of Ancyra
- Gaudentius (from before 343/344, apparently succeeding the former), till after 351, when he attended the council at Sirmium
- Bonosus (mentioned c. 380), who was deposed
- Martianus (before 409 to after 414), appointed by Pope Innocent I instead of the former
- Dalmatius (mentioned 451), allegedly signator in 458 of the letter of the bishops to Byzantine emperor Leo I the Thracian after the lynching by Coptic mobs of the Patriarch Proterius of Alexandria
- Gaianus (mentioned 516), invited to Constantinople by Byzantine Emperor Anastasius I Dicorus
- Proiectus, participant at the Ecumenical Second Council of Constantinople in 553 (which repudiated the Three Chapters as Nestorian, condemned Origen of Alexandria and decreed the Theopaschite Formula).

== Titular see ==
It is listed by the Catholic Church as a Latin titular see since the diocese was nominally restored in 1933 as Titular bishopric of Naissus (Latin) / Naisso (Curiate Italian) / Naissitan(us) (Latin adjective).

It has had the following incumbents, of the fitting Episcopal (lowest) rank, with a few archiepiscopal exceptions:

- William F. O’Shea, Maryknoll Fathers (M.M.) (born USA) (1939.07.11 – death 1945.02.27) as only Apostolic Vicar of Heijo (now Pyong-Yang, (North) Korea) (1939.07.11 – retired 1942)
- Henri Routhier, Missionary Oblates of Mary Immaculate (O.M.I.) (1945.06.15 – 1967.07.13) first as Coadjutor Vicar Apostolic of Grouard (Canada) (1945.06.15 – 1953.09.18), then (see promoted) as last Apostolic Vicar of Grouard (1953.09.18 – 1967.07.13); (see) later promoted first Metropolitan Archbishop of Grouard–McLennan (Canada) (1967.07.13 – retired 1972.11.21), died 1989
- Victor Hugo Martínez Contreras (1970.11.30 – 1975.09.20) as Auxiliary Bishop of Diocese of Huehuetenango (Guatemala) (1970.11.30 – 1975.09.20); later succeeded as Bishop of Huehuetenango (1975.09.20 – 1987.04.04), President of Episcopal Conference of Guatemala (1986 – 1988), last Suffragan Bishop of Quetzaltenango, Los Altos (Guatemala) (1987.04.04 – 1996.02.13), (see) promoted first Metropolitan Archbishop of Los Altos, Quetzaltenango–Totonicapán (Guatemala) (1996.02.13 – retired 2007.04.19), again President of Episcopal Conference of Guatemala (1998 – 2002)
- Paul Josef Cordes (1975.10.27 – 1995.12.02 see below) first as Auxiliary Bishop of Archdiocese of Paderborn (Germany) (1975.10.27 – 1980.03.11), then as Secretary of Pontifical Council for the Laity (1980.03.11 – 1995.12.02)
- Titular Archbishop: Paul Josef Cordes (see above 1995.12.02 – 2007.11.24) as President of Pontifical Council “Cor unum” (1995.12.02 – resigned 2010.10.07), created Cardinal-Deacon of S. Lorenzo in Piscibus (2007.11.24 [2008.05.11] – ...)
- Titular Archbishop: Ambrose Madtha (安博思) (born India) (2008.05.08 – death 2012.12.08) as papal diplomat : Apostolic Nuncio (ambassador) to Ivory Coast (2008.05.08 – 2012.12.08), previously Chargé d’affaires in PR China (2003.02.11 – 2008.05.08)
- Valdir Mamede (2013.02.06 – ...), Auxiliary Bishop of Archdiocese of Brasília (Brazil), no previous prelature.

== See also ==
- List of Catholic dioceses in Serbia

== Sources and external links ==
- GCatholic

Bibliography

- Pius Bonifacius Gams, Series episcoporum Ecclesiae Catholicae, Leipzig 1931, p. 417
- Daniele Farlati-Jacopo Coleti, Illyricum Sacrum, vol. VIII, Venice 1817, pp. 24–40
- Jacques Zeiller, Les origines chrétiennes dans les provinces danubiennes de l'empire romain, Paris 1918, pp. 158–159;
- Michel Lequien, Oriens christianus in quatuor Patriarchatus digestus, Paris 1740, vol. II, coll. 313-314
- Geoffrey Dunn, The Letter of Innocent I to Marcian of Niš, in Saint Emperor Constantine and Christianity, vol. I, Niš 2013, pp. 319–335
