= Kirchhundem =

- Town
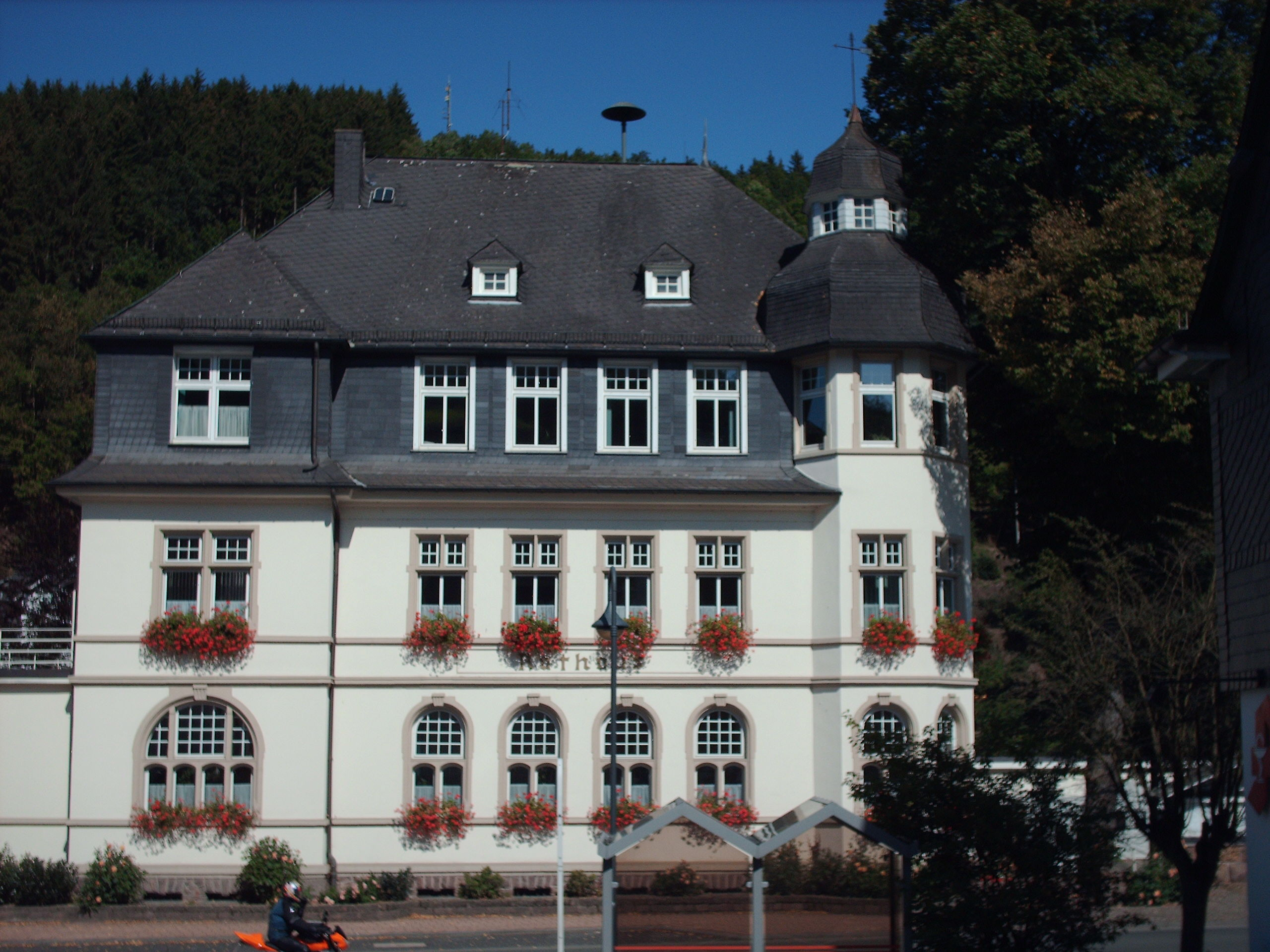
- Town hall in Kirchhundem

- Coat of arms

- Location of Kirchhundem within Olpe district
- Interactive map of Kirchhundem
- Location within Germany Location within North Rhine-Westphalia
- Coordinates: 51°04′N 08°05′E
- Country: Germany
- State: North Rhine-Westphalia
- Admin. region: Arnsberg
- District: Olpe
- Subdivisions: 37

Government
  - Mayor (2020–25): Björn Jarosz (CDU)

Area
  - Total: 148.63 km^{2} (57.39 sq mi)
- Elevation: 252–743 m (827–2,438 ft)

Population (2025-12-31)
  - Total: 11,297
  - Density: 76.008/km^{2} (196.86/sq mi)
- Time zone: UTC+01:00 (CET)
  - Summer (DST): UTC+02:00 (CEST)
- Postal codes: 57399
- Dialling codes: 02723, 02764, 02759
- Vehicle registration: OE
- Website: www.kirchhundem.de

Kirchhundem (German pronunciation: [ˈkɪʁçˌhʊndəm]) is a German municipality in North Rhine-Westphalia. It belongs to the Olpe district.

== Geography ==
=== Location ===
The municipality of Kirchhundem lies in the Olpe district's southeast in the south Sauerland and belongs to the so-called Bilsteiner Bergland (mountain region). The Kirchhundem rural areas also include, in the east, the West (Rüsper) Rothaar and part of the Auer Ederbergland, in the south the Brachthäuser Hohe Waldberge (all mountain ranges), in the west the Rahrbacher Mulde (basin) and in the north the Hundemgrund. The crest of the Rothaar forms a watershed between the Rhine and the Sieg. The municipality's highest elevation can be found here, the Hohe Hessel at 743 m. The Kirchhundem area is drained by the Hundem, which rises near Oberhundem and flows northwest to the Lenne. The Hundem is fed from the south by the Heinsberger Bach – also known as the Albaumer Bach (Bach is German for "brook") – whose mouth is near Würdinghausen, the brook variously known as the Brachthauser-, Wirmer- or Flaperbach and the Olpe, whose mouth is in Kirchhundem. The Silberger Bach empties into the Olpe near Heidschott. The Rüspe area east of the Rothaar crest is drained by streams flowing to the Eder.

Kirchhundem is roughly 20 km east of Olpe and 25 km north of Siegen.

=== Municipal area’s extent ===
Kirchhundem, with an area of 147.9 km^{2}, is the Olpe district's biggest municipality by land area. It stretches for 12 km from north to south and 22 km from east to west.

=== Neighbouring municipalities ===
The municipality of Kirchhundem lies in the east of the district area. It borders in the west and north on the towns of Olpe and Lennestadt and in the far northeast on the town of Schmallenberg in the Hochsauerlandkreis. In the east and south, the towns of Bad Berleburg, Erndtebrück, Hilchenbach and Kreuztal, all lying in Siegen-Wittgenstein district, also abut Kirchhundem.

=== Municipal limit ===
The municipality's southern limit with the neighbouring district of Siegen-Wittgenstein has more than one function: in the east, it is the watershed between the Rhine and Weser and in the west between the Sieg and Ruhr. It is also a dialectal boundary, and a religious boundary, with areas to the south traditionally Evangelical and those to the north Catholic. Historically it was also the border between the Duchy of Westphalia, a possession of the Electorate of Cologne in the north, and the Principality of Nassau-Siegen and the County of Wittgenstein-Berleburg in the south. This time is still witnessed by many historic border stones and old fortification walls known to people in the victorious lands as the Kölsches Heck (roughly "Cologne Hedge").

=== Constituent municipalities ===
The municipality of Kirchhundem consists of the following centres:

Place	Inhabitants
Ahe	6
Albaum	814
Alpenhaus	5
Arnoldihof	5
Benolpe	495
Berghof	8
Bettinghof	10
Böminghausen	44
Böminghauser Werk	4
Brachthausen	484
Breitenbruch	6
Emlinghausen	41
Erlhof	56

Place	Inhabitants
Flape	258
Haus Bruch	7
Heidschott	24
Heinsberg	1,041
Herrntrop	133
Hofolpe	808
Kirchhundem	2,273
Kohlhagen	3
Kruberg	135
Mark	7
Marmecke	388
Oberhundem	979
Rahrbach	712

Place	Inhabitants
Rhein-Weser-Turm	9
Rinsecke	246
Rüspe	35
Schwartmecke	118
Selbecke	198
Silberg	474
Stelborn	38
Varste	219
Welschen Ennest	1,661
Wirme	189
Würdinghausen	1,069
other places	2
Total	13,004

=== Climate ===
Yearly precipitation averages between 900 and 1 300 mm while the average temperature for the year as a whole ranges between 6 and 8 °C.

== History ==
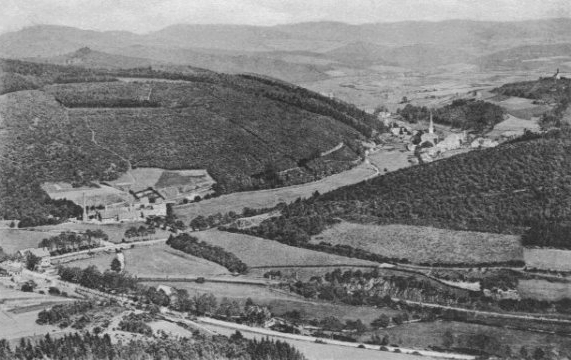
View from the Krähenberg over Kirchhundem (about 1900)

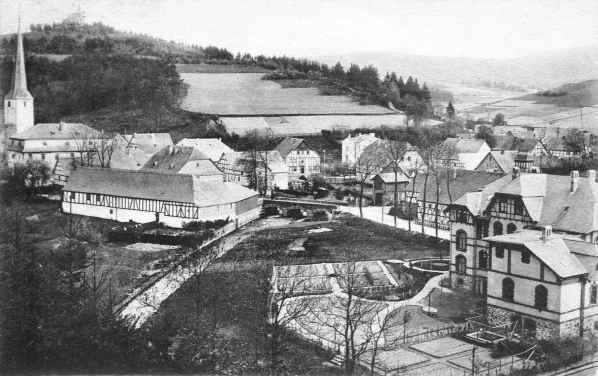
View from the Hard over Kirchhundem (about 1905)

Up until roughly the 8th century, thick broadleaf forests blanketed what is now Kirchhundem's municipal area. Beeches dominated the hills and slopes while oaks, elms, maples and other kinds of trees held sway in the dales.

The first people are believed to have settled in the area of the Altes Feld ("Old Field") near Kirchhundem and in the Olpe Valley. About the 9th century they began clearing and settling activities, which lasted until the 13th century.

The Hundem area's – "curia nomine homede" – first documentary mention might be the one found in one of Emperor Frederick I's documents from the year 1153. This attribution, however, is as much disputed as the other documents. The oldest undisputed reference is a document from the Kirchhundem parish archive from the year 1249, in which the conditions are laid out whereby Vogt (roughly "reeve") Widekind of Hundem (a mediaeval name for Kirchhundem's main centre) was to allow his people and others to make the Margaretenaltar at Hundem their own.

As a second centre, Würdinghausen was mentioned in 1270. Only nine years later, so were Bettinghusen (Bettinghof), Böminghausen, Emlinghausen and Flape. In the two centuries that followed, almost all the centres that now make up today's municipality were mentioned in documents. Furthermore, many other centres are named that have since been forsaken.

At its beginnings, the area was held by the Noble Lords of Gevore-Bilstein. Johann II von Bilstein relinquished his lordly claim to Count Gottfried IV of Arnsberg in 1350. After Johann's death in 1363, however, Gottfried could not assert his claim to the land of Bilstein and it fell to Count Engelbert III von der Mark. As a result of the Soest Feud, the land of Bilstein, and thereby also the area that is now the municipality of Kirchhundem, ended up in the ownership of the Archbishop of Cologne in 1445. The area was held by the Electorate of Cologne right up until 1802-1803, its overlordship ending only with Secularization. The former Duchy of Westphalia passed to the Landgrave at Hesse-Darmstadt. He introduced, through many reforms after 350 years of church control, the end of the Middle Ages in the southern Sauerland. After Napoleon's abdication, Grand Duke Ludwig I also had to relinquish his holdings in Prussia, which he had only acquired a few years earlier. The area was incorporated into the newly formed Prussian Province of Westphalia. Under Prussian governance, other reforms were implemented. Among other things, the Amt of Kirchhundem, the current municipality's forerunner, was brought into being in the course of the introduction of the Landgemeindeordnung ("Rural municipality Ordinance") in 1843.

The municipality of Kirchhundem in its current form came into being on 1 July 1969 on the occasion of municipal reforms. Kirchhundem was assigned areas formerly belonging to the municipalities of Heinsberg, Kohlhagen and Oberhundem in the old Amt of Kirchhundem, parts of the former municipality of Kirchhundem and the municipality of Rahrbach (excepting the villages of Fahlenscheid and Benolpe), formerly belonging to the Amt of Bilstein.

=== Religion ===
Owing to its long historical connection with possessions of the Archbishop of Cologne, the municipality of Kirchhundem is overwhelmingly Catholic in character. Although it is right near the overwhelmingly Evangelical Siegerland, there were only a few Evangelical inhabitants here in the past. A considerable mix of the two denominations came about only through the population shifts that resulted from the Second World War.

==== Catholic ====
Within the municipal area are twelve Catholic parishes (Albaum, Benolpe, Heinsberg, Hofolpe, Kirchhundem, Kohlhagen, Marmecke, Oberhundem, Rahrbach, Silberg, Welschen-Ennest and Würdinghausen). The oldest parishes in Kirchhundem, Oberhundem and Rahrbach, have existed since at least the 13th century. Two parishes split away from the parish of Kirchhundem in the 17th century to form separate parishes: Heinsberg (1628) and Kohlhagen (1655).

Owing to a dearth of priests and money over the last few years, it has been impossible to fill some ecclesiastical posts. Instead, the Church has organized groups of parishes into clusters called Pastoralverbunde, each overseen by several priests. The parishes of Albaum, Heinsberg, Hofolpe, Kirchhundem, Marmecke, Oberhundem and Würdinghausen form one such cluster, named the Pastoralverbund Hundemtal and another such cluster is made up of the parishes of Benolpe, Kohlhagen, Rahrbach, Silberg and Welschen-Ennest and named the Pastoralverbund Am Cölschen Heck.

==== Evangelical ====
The greater part of the Evangelical parishioners within Kirchhundem's municipal area are served by the parish of Lennestadt-Kirchhundem while a smaller number are served by the parish of Krombach. In Würdinghausen stands the Emmauskirche, Kirchhundem's only Evangelical church.

== Population ==
Historical population

Year	Pop.	±% p.a.
1965	11,535	—
1970	11,899	+0.62%
1975	11,782	−0.20%
1980	11,673	−0.19%
1985	11,519	−0.27%
1990	12,202	+1.16%
1995	13,030	+1.32%

Year	Pop.	±% p.a.
2000	13,047	+0.03%
2005	12,870	−0.27%
2010	12,247	−0.99%
2015	11,854	−0.65%
2020	11,353	−0.86%
2025	11,297	−0.10%

Source: Landesdatabank Nordrhein-Westfalen

== Politics ==
=== Municipal council ===
Results of the municipal election on 26 September 2004
Party	Votes	± compared to 1999	Seats
CDU	42.6%	-19.9%	11
SPD	27.1%	+0.3%	7
FW	25.7%	+19.4%	7
Grüne	4.6%	+0.1%	1

=== Mayor ===
The current mayor is Björn Jarosz (CDU), elected in September 2020.

==== Mayors of the Bürgermeisterei and of the Amt of Kirchhundem ====
Sources:

- 1829–1830: Schwermer (Heinsberg)
- 1830–1851: Johann Adam Engelbert Sommer (Kirchhundem)
- 1851–1859: Haverkamp (Würdinghausen)
- 1859–1872: Engelbert Brüning (Vasbach)
- 1872–1902: Friedrich Brüning (Vasbach)
- 1902–1912: Clemens Statzner
- 1912–1931: Johann Henken
- 1931–1934: Dr. Adolf Marx (on leave by 1933)
- 1934–1945: Dr. Siegfried Hucke (as of 1942 called into the forces)
- 1942–1943: Wurm (Wenden) commissary
- 1943-1945: Fritz Contzen (Attendorn) commissary
- 1945–1945: Josef Schmidt (Altenhundem)

In 1946 came the separation of administration (Amtsdirektor) and representation (Bürgermeister, or mayor).

==== Honorary Amtsbürgermeister ====
- 1946–1946: Bernhard Oppenheim (Kirchhundem)
- 1946–1948: Dr. Wilhelm Deitmer (Saalhausen)
- 1948–1961: Johann Stangier (Altenhundem)
- 1961–1969: Karl Nöcker (Altenhundem, later Selbecke)

==== Amtsdirektoren ====
- 1947–1961: Ernst Großheim
- 1961–1969: Franz-Josef Hackmann

In 1969, the Amt of Kirchhundem was dissolved. Great parts of the Amt area passed to the newly created municipality of Kirchhundem. At the same time, the official nomenclature changed.

==== Honorary Mayors ====
- 1969–1994: Karl-Josef Luster-Haggeney
- 1994–1999: Elmar Greiten

==== municipality Directors ====
- 1969–1982: Franz-Josef Hackmann
- 1982–1992: Rudolf Lange
- 1993–1999: Hans-Adolf Bender

==== Mayors ====
- 1999–2004: Elmar Greiten
- 2004–2013: Michael Grobbel
- 2014–2020: Andreas Reinery
- 2020–incumbent: Björn Jarosz

=== Coat of arms ===

The municipal arms were conferred on the municipality of Kirchhundem on 24 February 1972, and they are those formerly borne by the old Amt of Kirchhundem. The billets (small rectangles) are an historical reference; they were taken from the coat of arms borne by the Knights of Hundem. The hart’s antlers refer to the wealth of red deer in the Kirchhundem area. The Wolfsangel symbolizes the municipality’s agricultural character.

=== Town partnerships ===
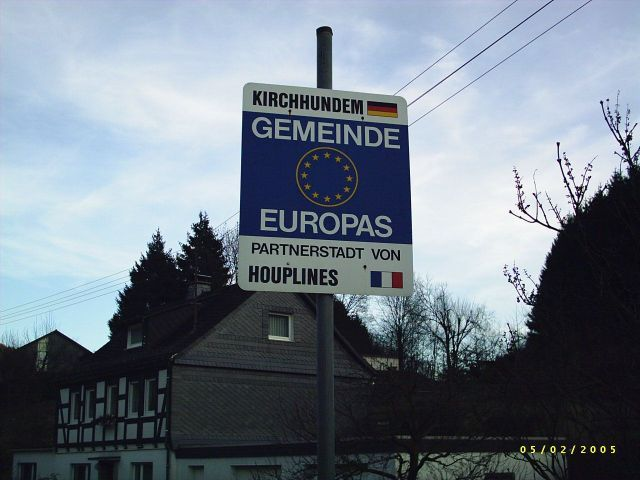
Sign announcing the partnership

Since 1989 there has been a partnership arrangement with the French town of Houplines. The partner municipality lies in the northeast of France near Lille. Contacts between Kirchhundem and Houplines take place mainly at the club level. On the occasion of a visit by members of the Kirchhundem municipal council to Houplines in November 2006, a new housing estate there called the Résidence Kirchhundem was dedicated by both municipalities’ mayors. To strengthen the town partnership, the club Freunde von Houplines ("Friends of Houplines") has been founded.

== Culture and sightseeing ==
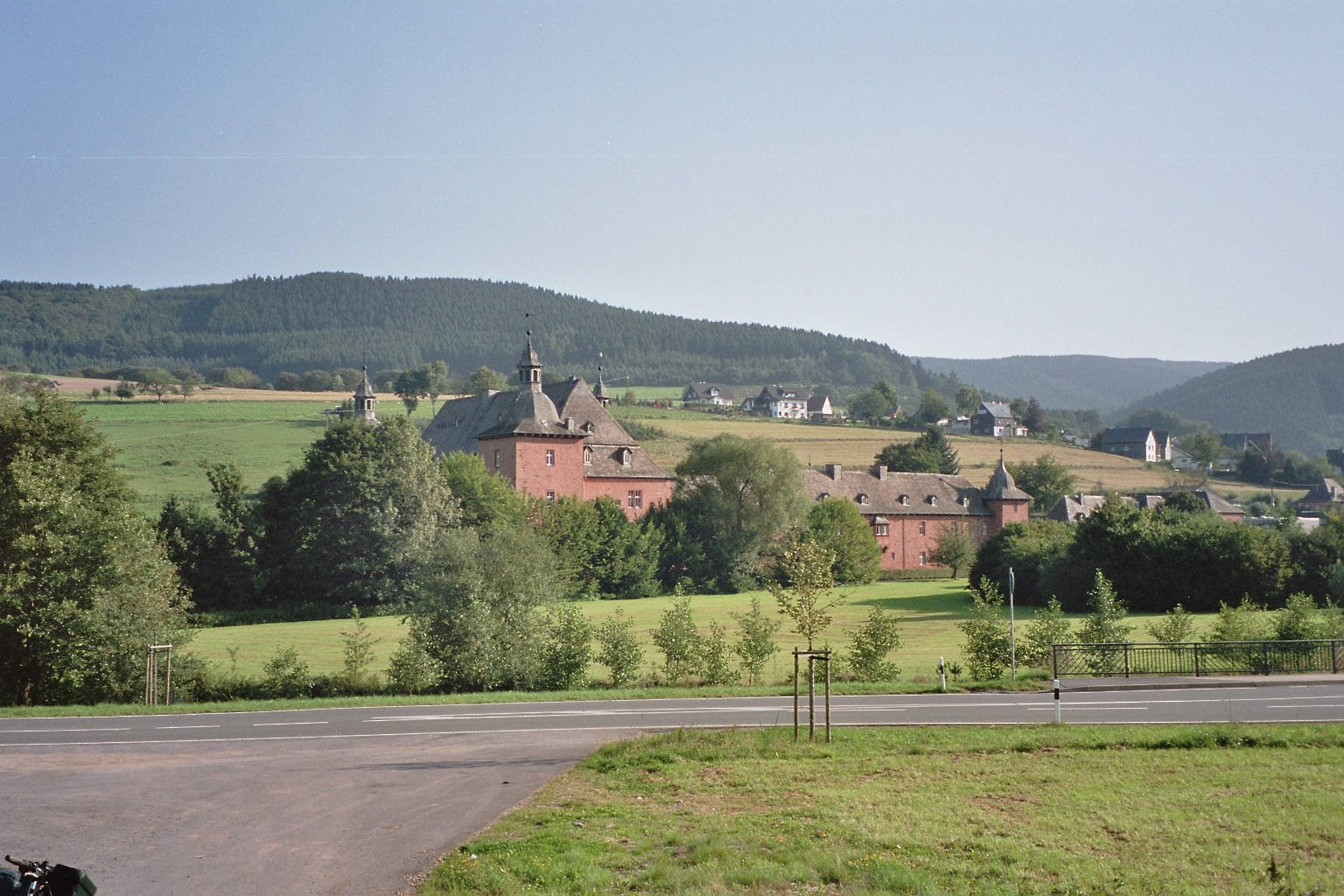
The Adolfsburg near Oberhundem

Kirchhundem offers, with its location on the Rothaarsteig trail, which runs from Brilon to Dillenburg, recreational activity that is especially interesting for hikers. As well, there is another trail, the Kirchhundemer Rundwanderweg running for roughly 90 km along the municipal limits. A favourite hiking destination is the Rhein-Weser-Turm (tower) near Oberhundem, from which there are good views over the southern Sauerland.

Also in Oberhundem are found the Schloss Adolfsburg, a Baroque residential castle with a moat, and the amusement park Panorama-Park Sauerland, which is even open in the winter. Entrance to the wilderness park area is then free.

=== Conservation ===
The Biologische Station Initiative Oberhundem e.V. occupies itself with conservation. It supports schools, holds exhibitions and acts as adviser in the remodelling of the spa gardens.

=== Theatre ===
- The Theaterverein Oberhundem, an amateur theatrical troupe, presents a folk play every year at Christmastime at the village municipality hall (Dorfgemeinschaftshalle) in Oberhundem.
- The municipality of Kirchhundem lies within the area served by the Kulturgemeinde Hundem-Lenne e. V. ("Cultural municipality") which customarily offers high-class theatre and concert programmes at the educational centre (pädagogisches Zentrum) in Lennestadt-Meggen.

=== Museums ===
- The Steinacker family's Oberhundem Embroidery Museum presents embroidery works from several centuries in the historical surroundings of a more than 300-year-old timber frame house. Address: Stickereimuseum Oberhundem, Rüsper Straße 1, 57399 Kirchhundem.

=== Music ===
==== Choirs ====
- Frauenchor Concordia Heinsberg (women's choir)
- Frauenchor Marmecke (women's choir)
- Frauenchor Welschen Ennest (women's choir)
- Gemischter Chor Cäcilia Brachthausen, champions in the Chorverband Nordrhein-Westfalen 2007 (mixed choir)
- Gemischter Chor Rahrbach (mixed choir)
- Kath. Kirchenchor St. Peter und Paul / St. Bartholomäus
  Kirchhundem / Würdinghausen (Catholic church choir)
- Kinderchor BRAWIVASI Brachthausen (children's choir)
- Kinderchor Oberhundem (children's choir)
- Kirchenchor St. Cäcilia Oberhundem (church choir)
- MC Rüsper Klang Marmecke
- MGV 1871 Oberhundem (men's singing club)
- MGV 1918 Hofolpe, champions in the Chorverband Nordrhein-Westfalen 2007 (men's singing club)
- MGV Cäcilia Welschen Ennest (men's singing club)
- MGV Concordia Heinsberg (men's singing club)
- MGV Elisabeth e. V. Benolpe (men's singing club)
- MGV Liederkranz Würdinghausen (men's singing club)
- MGV Liedertafel-Eintracht 1853 Kirchhundem, champions in the Chorverband Nordrhein-Westfalen 2007 (men's singing club)

==== Music clubs ====
- Musikverein Albaum
- Musikverein Heinsberg
- Musikverein Rahrbach
- Musikverein Rinsecke-Oberhundem
- Musikzug der Freiw. Feuerwehr Brachthausen (fire brigade band)
- Tambourcorps Hofolpe
- Tambourcorps Kirchhundem

==== Modern music groups ====
- And Bob's y'r uncle – rock, Wirme
- Horizont – new spiritual, Welschen Ennest
- Wild bunch – country, Benolpe
- Naturtrüb - rock, Rahrbach/Welschen Ennest
- Social Distrust – punk, Flape
- Dirty Pins – bam bam rock, Flape

==== Historic organs ====
- Brachthausen, Nikolaus-Kapelle, historic ranks of pipes, likely from the 17th century. Although it is unexplained where they came from, they might be from Düren in the Rhineland.
- Kirchhundem, Pfarrkirche St. Peter und Paul, Baroque organ from 1701 by the Bielefeld organ builder Peter Henrich Varenholt. Considerable changes made in 1814 by Christian Roetzel. Stately Baroque housing by cabinetmaker Johann Viegener from Netphen with carving by sculptor Johann Sasse, Attendorn. As well, the church owns an organ from the firm Feith, Paderborn from 1940 made to imitate those of the Late Romantic period in Germany.
- Kohlhagen, Pfarr- und Wallfahrtskirche St. Mariae Heimsuchung, Baroque organ from 1745, probably by Johann Heinrich Kleine from Eckenhagen. At the turn of the 19th century the organ's whole aspect was changed and the console, once built onto the back of the housing, was moved to the short side on the north end. The addition of a further windchest was likely done at the same time.
- Oberhundem, Pfarrkirche St. Lambertus, Renaissance organ, built in 1650 for the parish church in Stockum coming in 1811 to Oberhundem. The organ has undergone many changes, such as the one in 1772 when the windchest was expanded to 49 tones by organ builder Gerhard Nohl, and another in 1811 which saw a further five-tone windchest and an independent four-rank pedalboard. In 1907 a far-reaching overhaul of the organ's aspect was done by Gerhard Peekel from Hagen as well as the installation of a four-rank addition with pneumatic tracker action.
- Rahrbach, Pfarrkirche St. Dionysius, Baroque organ by organ builder Ruhm from 1700/1701. In 1835 came a thorough overhaul by Christian Roetzel that removed or rearranged one rank. He also moved the console to the instrument's south end. After many changes, the most serious of which was undertaken by the Kemper firm of Lübeck in 1953, there came in 1992 a thorough restoration bearing in mind that there were historic and monumental considerations to be observed in the work.

=== Buildings ===
Currently, 97 buildings in Kirchhundem are on the municipality's monument list (Denkmalliste), among them the parish churches in the centres of Albaum, Benolpe, Heinsberg, Kirchhundem, Kohlhagen, Oberhundem, Rahrbach and Welschen Ennest as well as the chapels in Brachthausen, Emlinghausen, Kruberg and Selbecke. The private chapel on the Vasbach estate near Kirchhundem is likewise listed. One of the most outstanding monumental building works is the Adolfsburg, a residential castle built in the 1670s, near Oberhundem. Important buildings in the municipality of Kirchhundem are the Art Nouveau town hall built between 1903 and 1905 and the many timber-frame houses in the municipality's various centres. The Heitmickeviadukt in Kirchhundem, the Kirchhundem-Flape railway station reception building, the aqueduct in the Krenkel Valley near Heinsberg and the portals of the Heinsberger Tunnel are witnesses to the old Altenhundem–Birkelbach Railway, most of which ran through Kirchhundem's current municipal area. The municipality's hallmark is the Rhein-Weser-Turm, an observation tower built in 1932 to afford views of the Rhine-Weser watershed.

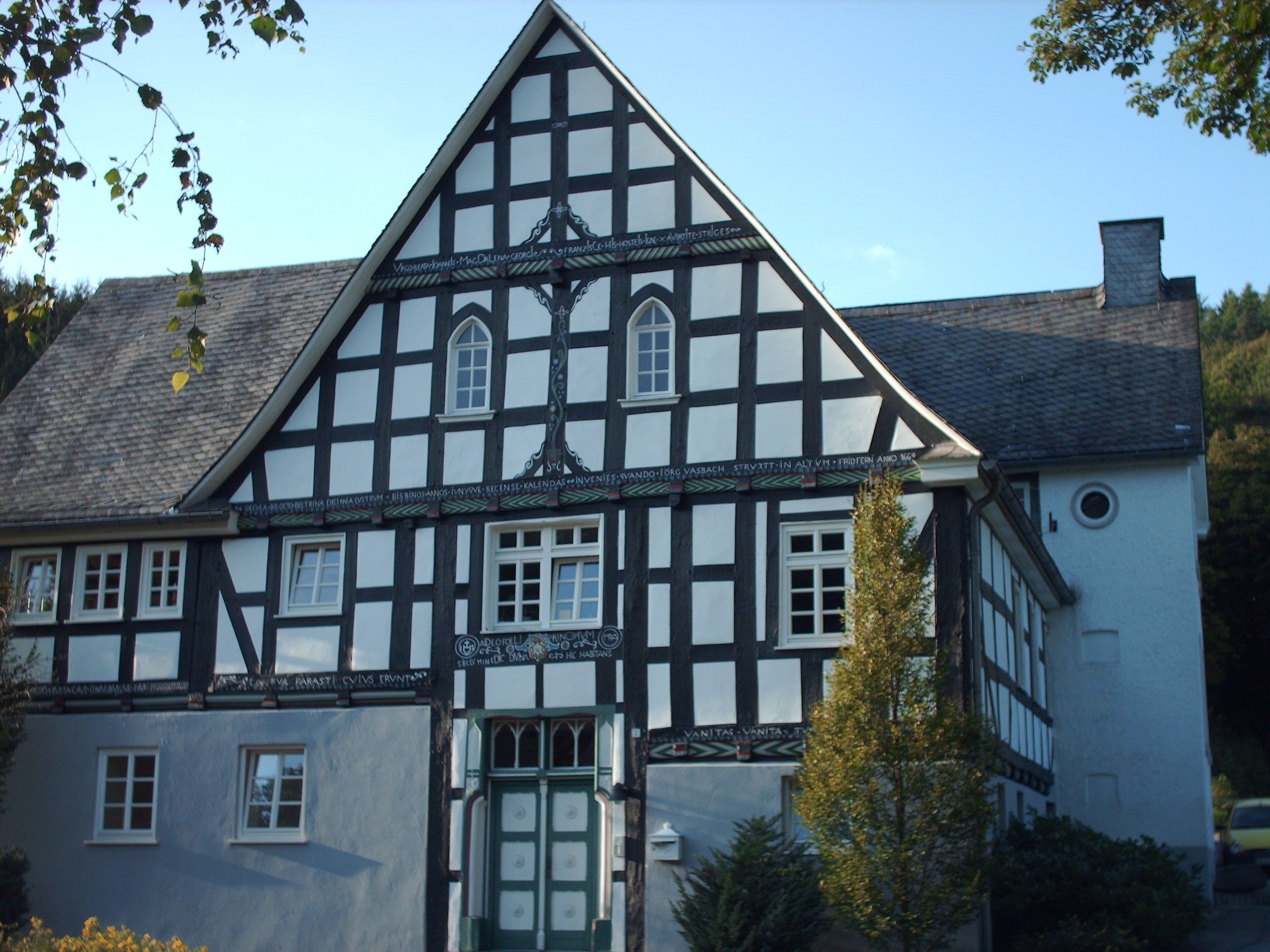
Timber framing at the Vaspach estate

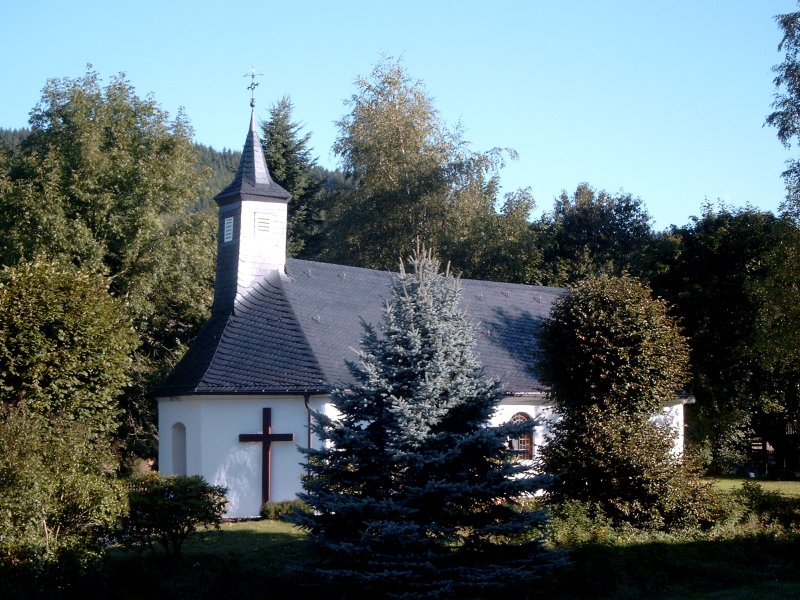
Chapel in Selbecke

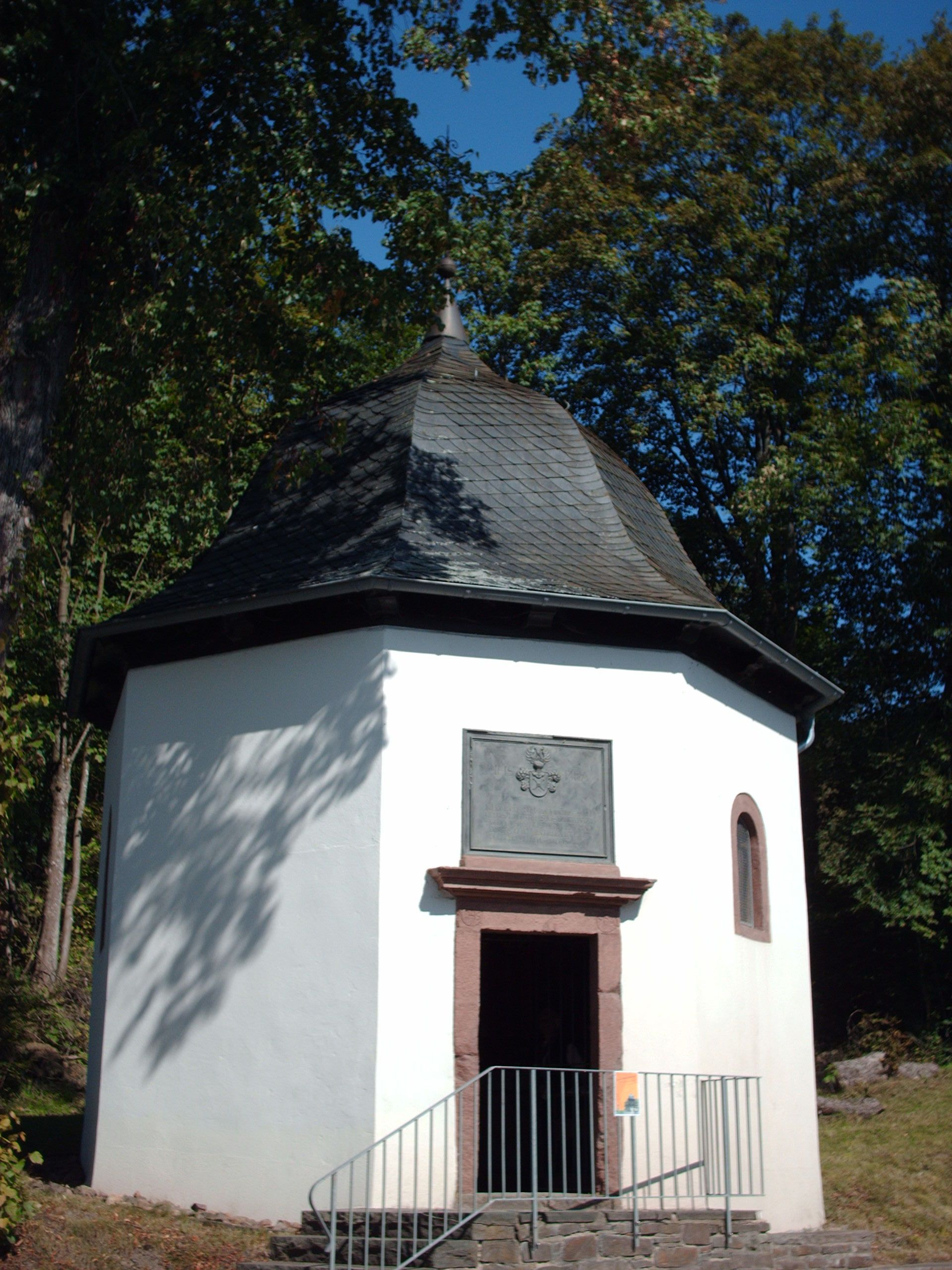
Vasbach Chapel

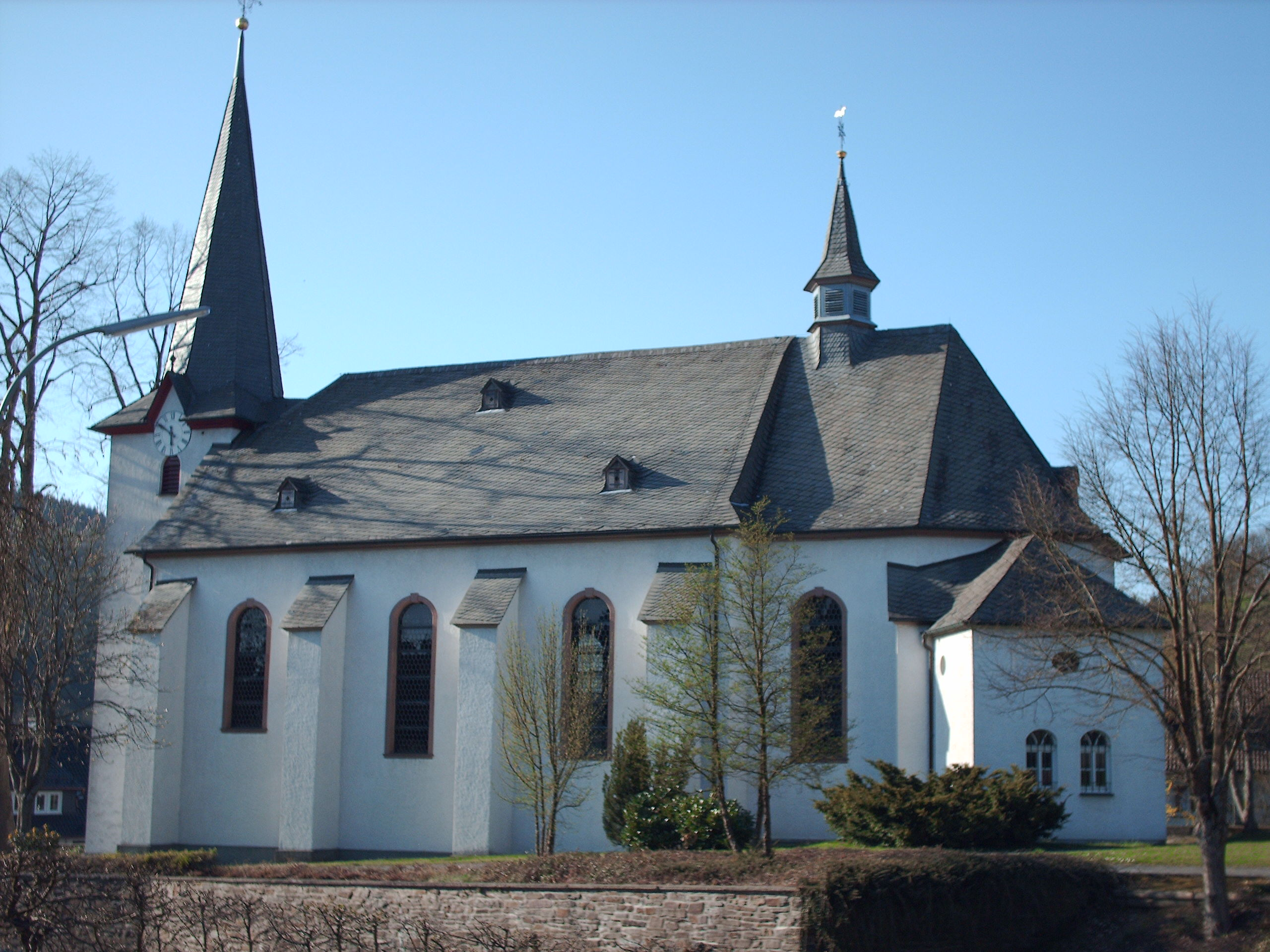
St. Katharina Heinsberg

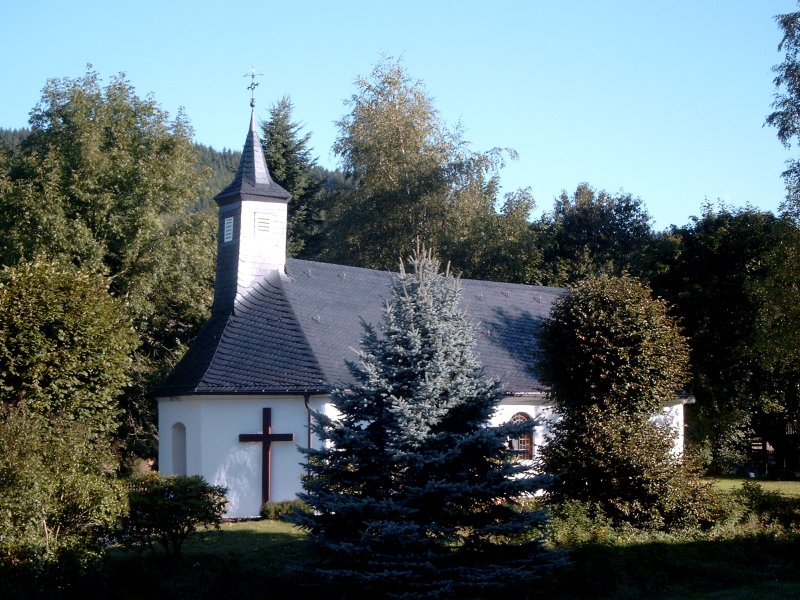
Selbecke Chapel

=== Kirche St. Peter und Paul ===
As the oldest parish in the eastern part of the lordly domain of Bilstein, having split away from the mother parish of Wormbach, "Hundem’s" own church, the Church of Saints Peter and Paul, is known to history as far back as 1261. Of the forerunner building, all that still stands now is two bays and the tower's foundation, which according to cornerstones were built in 1340 and 1470. The old organ with its carving work comes from the years 1701/02 from the Sasse sculpture studio in Attendorn. Today's Late Gothic parish church was built between 1915 and 1917 by Prof. Joseph Buchkremer during the First World War crosswise to the old Romanesque church. The old church had three naves each with four bays. The south nave's west bay had two floors and a groin vault.

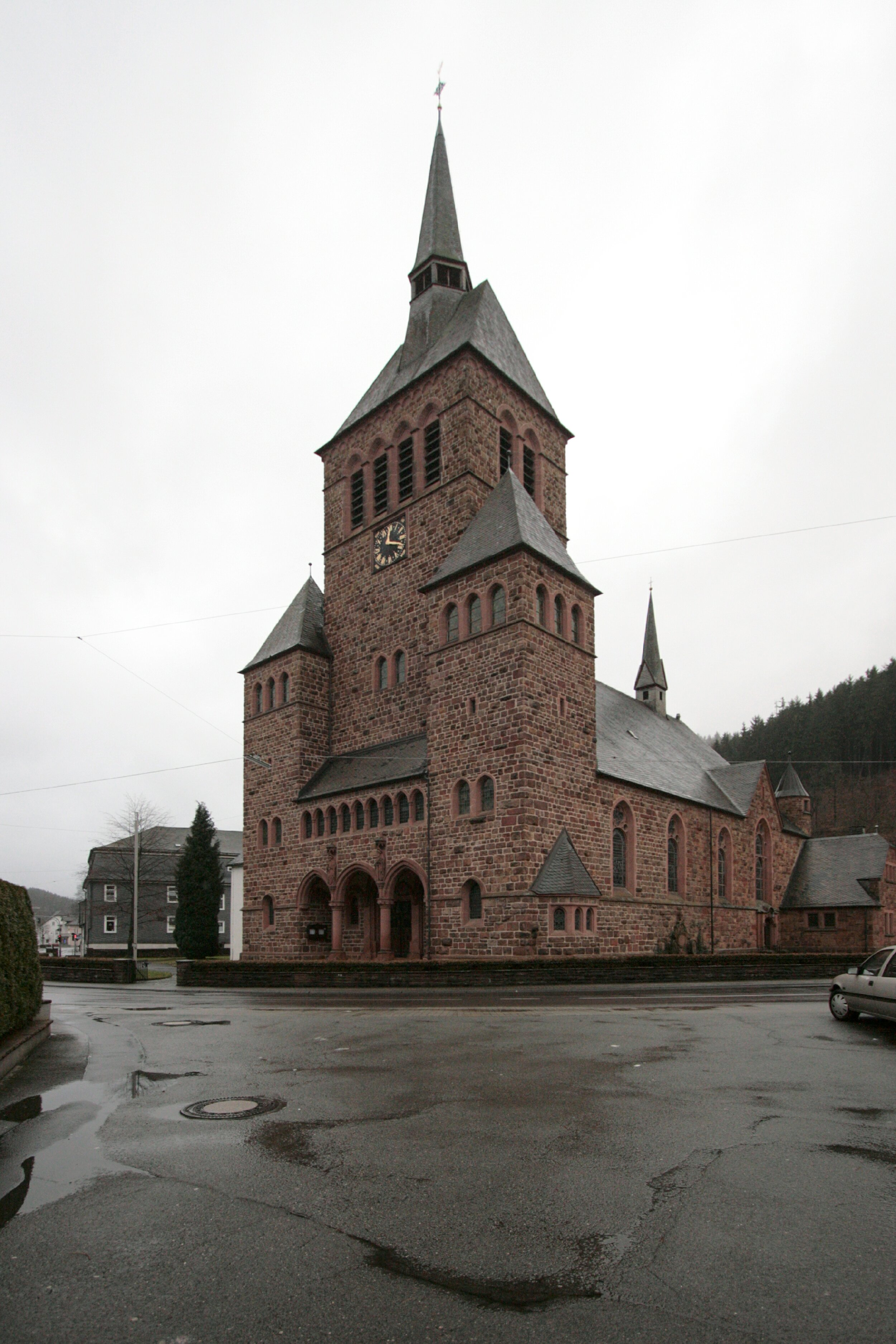
Outside view from the southeast, St. Peter und Paul Kirchhundem

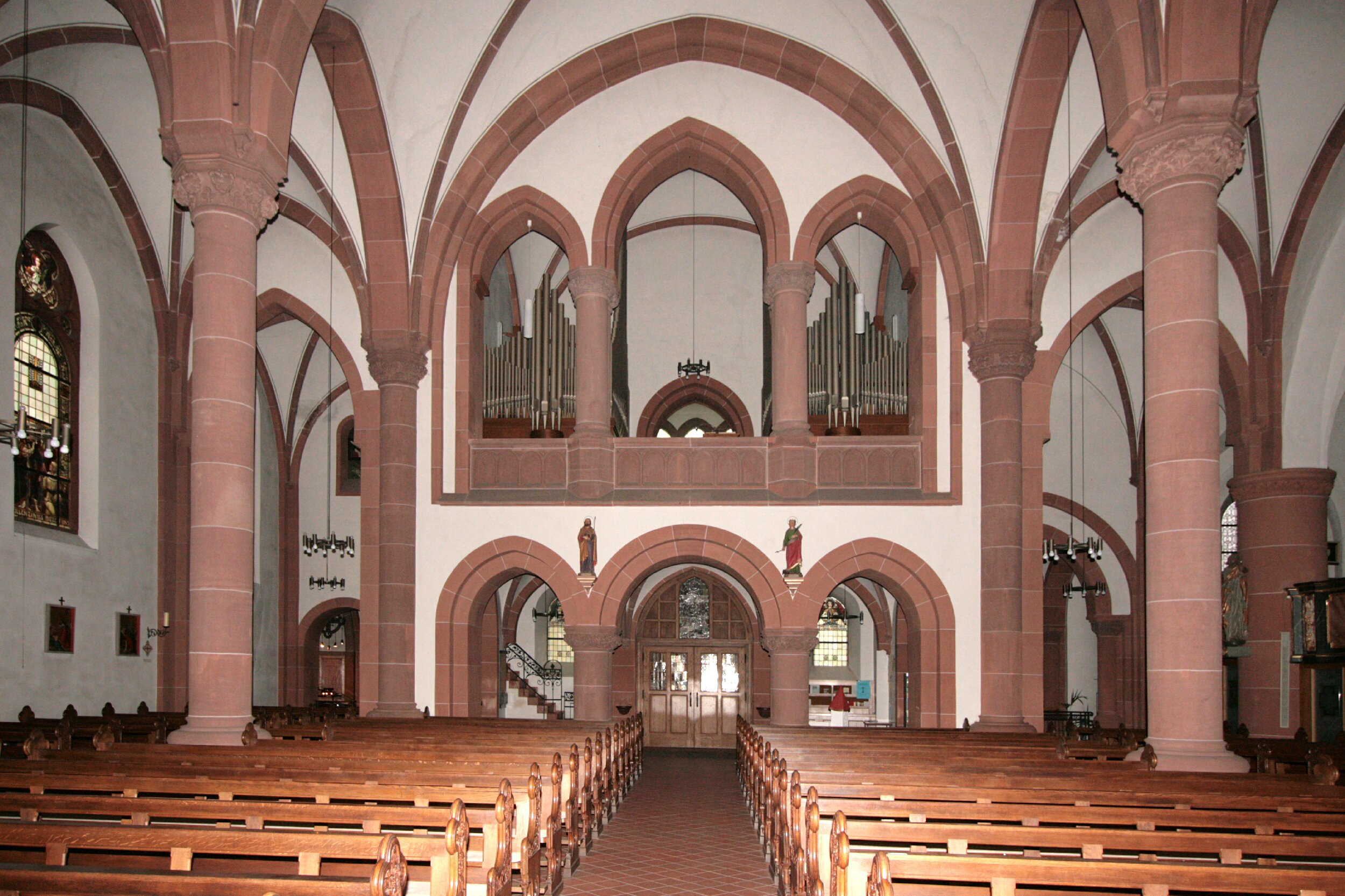
Entry door and organ loft

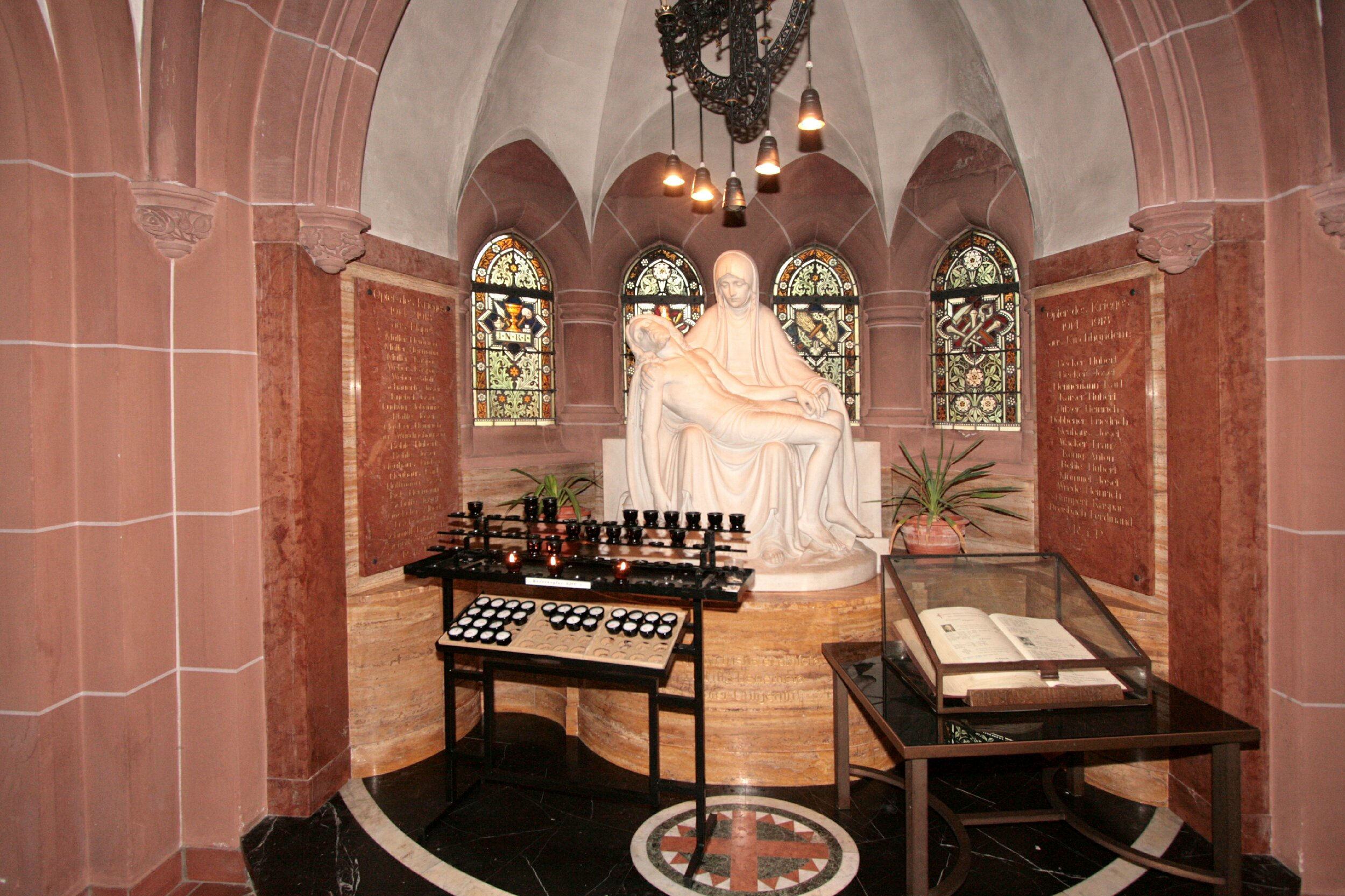
Old church's sanctuary

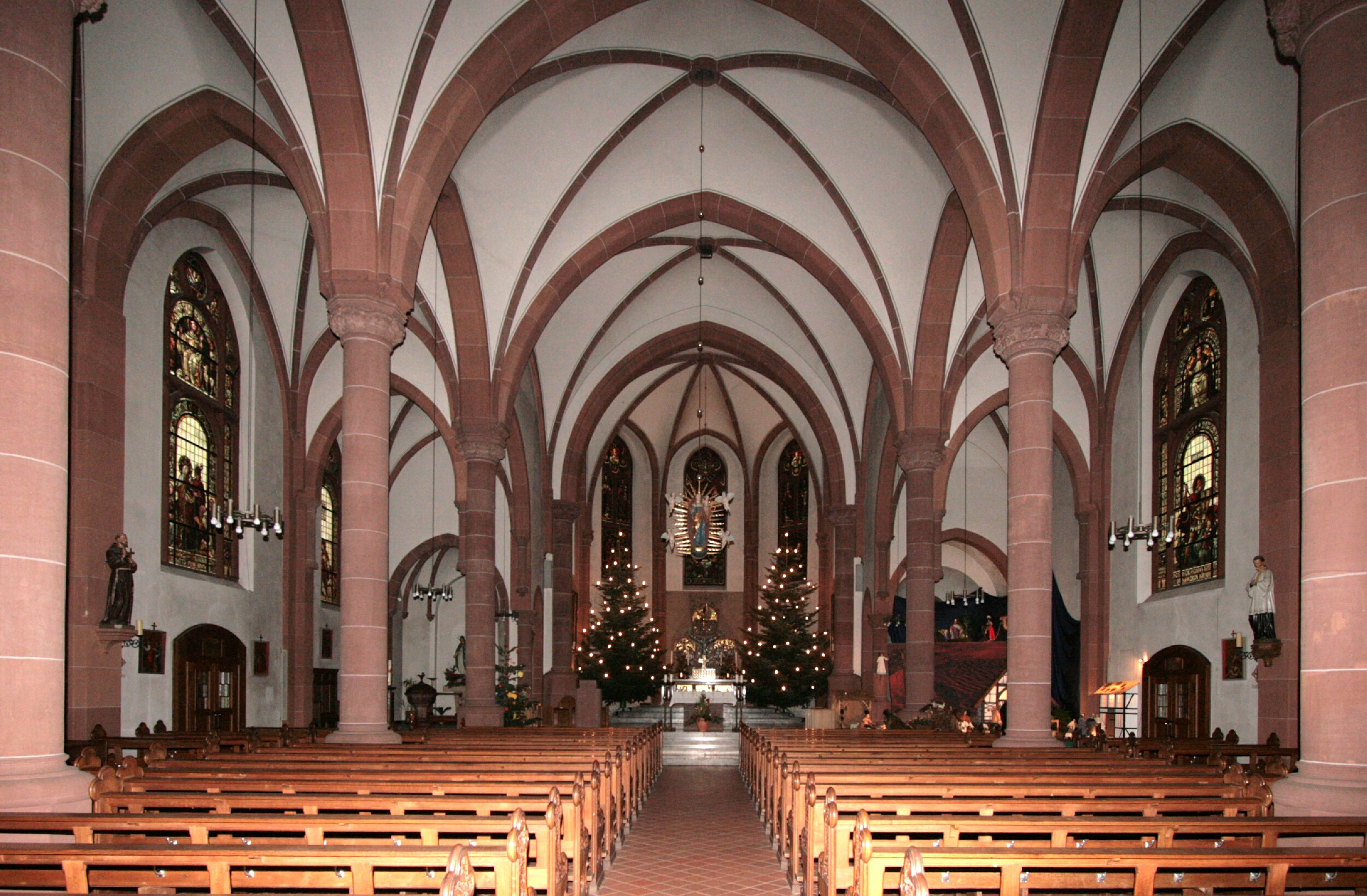
Inside view towards the altar

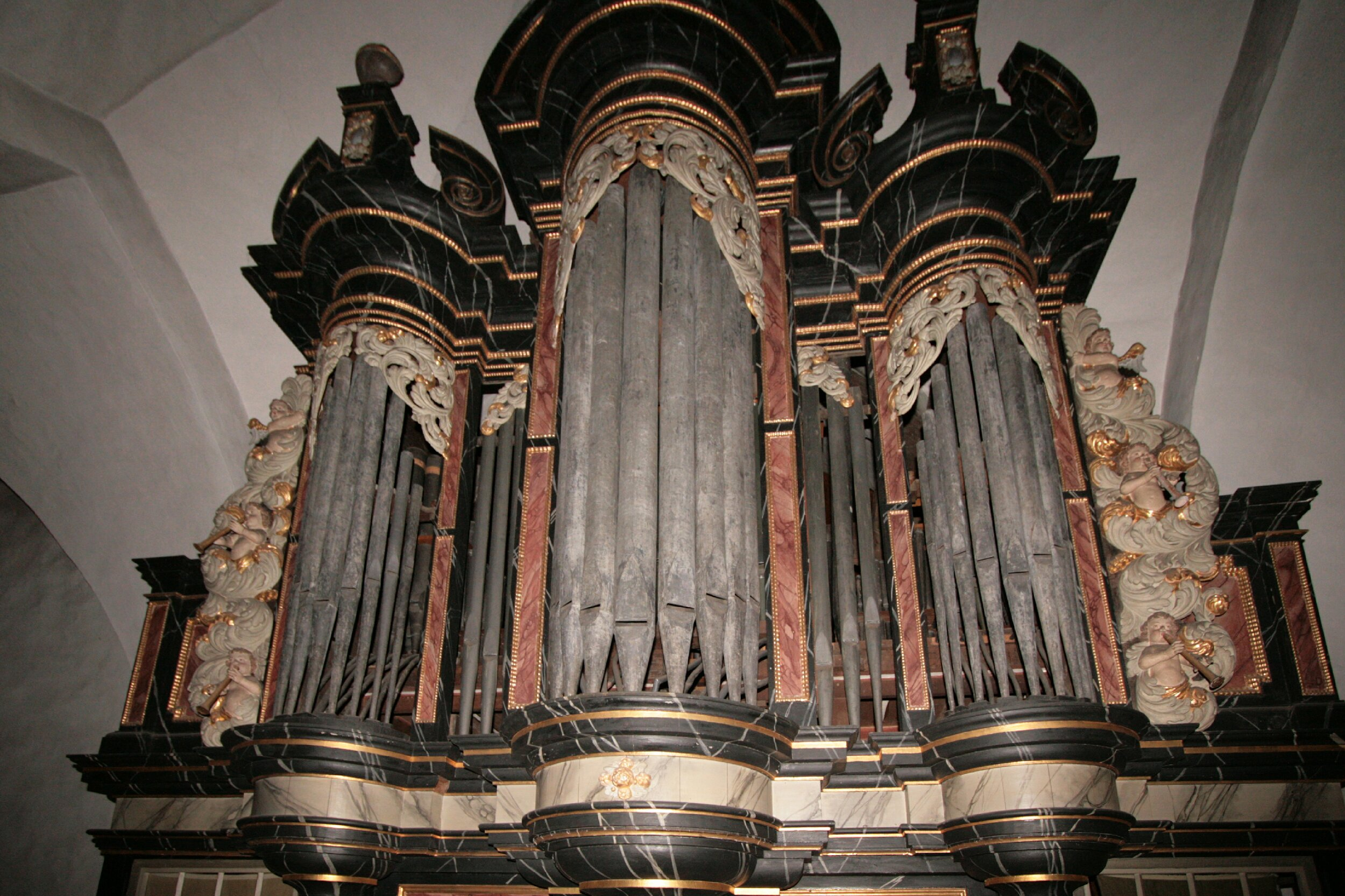
Old organ from 1701/2

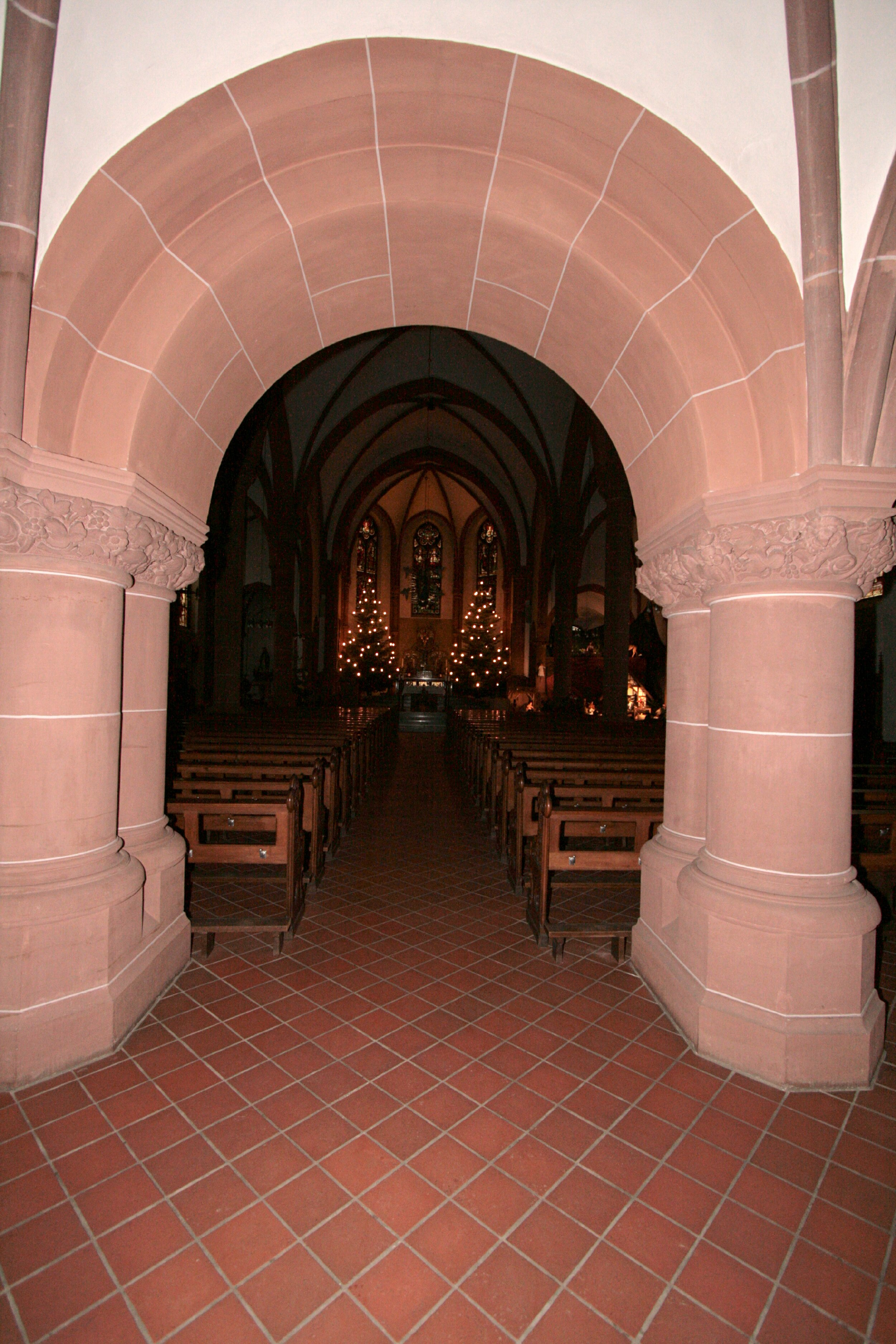
Entry door from inside

=== Further reading (churches) ===
- Overmann, Anton, 1940, Teil II, Die kirchlichen Baudenkmäler des Kreises Olpe
- Dehio/Gall, 1935, Erster Band, Handbuch der Deutschen Kunstdenkmäler in Niedersachsen und Westfalen
- Ludorf, Bau- und Kunstdenkmäler des Kreises Olpe
- Breer und Höffer, 1999, Kirchen und Kapellen in Attendorn. Lennestadt, Kirchhundem

=== Parks ===
The municipality of Kirchhundem lies in the Ebbegebirge and Rothaargebirge nature parks.

=== Conservation areas ===
The following areas in the municipality of Kirchhundem are set aside as conservation areas (Naturschutzgebiete): Albaumer Klippen, Danzplatz, Dollenbruch, Haberg, Hardt, Kihlenberg, Krähenpfuhl, Krenkeltal, Schwarzbachtal, Sellenbruch, Stelborner Klippen, Vorspanneiche and Teufelsbruch.

Most of these conservation areas are made up of juniper heathlands. The Sellenbruch conservation area, on the other hand, also harbours widespread royal fern growth. Some of the areas mentioned above were given conservation area status under initiatives by Wilhelm Münker (1874-1970) from Hilchenbach. At the Albaumer Klippen (cliffs), which are composed of silicate, is found crevice vegetation that has been deemed worthy of protection, surrounded by mixed forests on the slopes full of ravines and oaktrees. The Stelborner Klippen are only moderately shaded silicate cliffs made up of cinder and crystal tuffs with crevice vegetation and partly beech and oak forests growing on scree.

=== Sport ===
For various sporting activities, a great number of sport clubs have been founded.

Artificial turf fields have been built in Albaum, Brachthausen, Heinsberg, Kirchhundem, Oberhundem and Rahrbach. Gymnasia exist at the Gemeinschaftshauptschule Kirchhundem (triple gymnasium) and at primary schools in Heinsberg, Kirchhundem, Oberhundem and Welschen Ennest. Also, the TuS Silberg-Varste e. V. (gymnastic and sport club) has a gymnasium in Silberg. There is an athletics facility at the Gemeinschaftshauptschule Kirchhundem. The TC Rot-Weiß Kirchhundem (tennis club) owns tennis courts.

=== Regular events ===
Among the municipality's regular events are the shooting festivals held in all the bigger centres each year.

In Kirchhundem-Silberg, each year on 1 May, the Großer Preis von Silbergstone ("Grand Prix of Silbergstone"). This event is the origin of what is now the Europe-wide pastime of Bobbycar racing.

== Economy and infrastructure ==
=== Transport ===
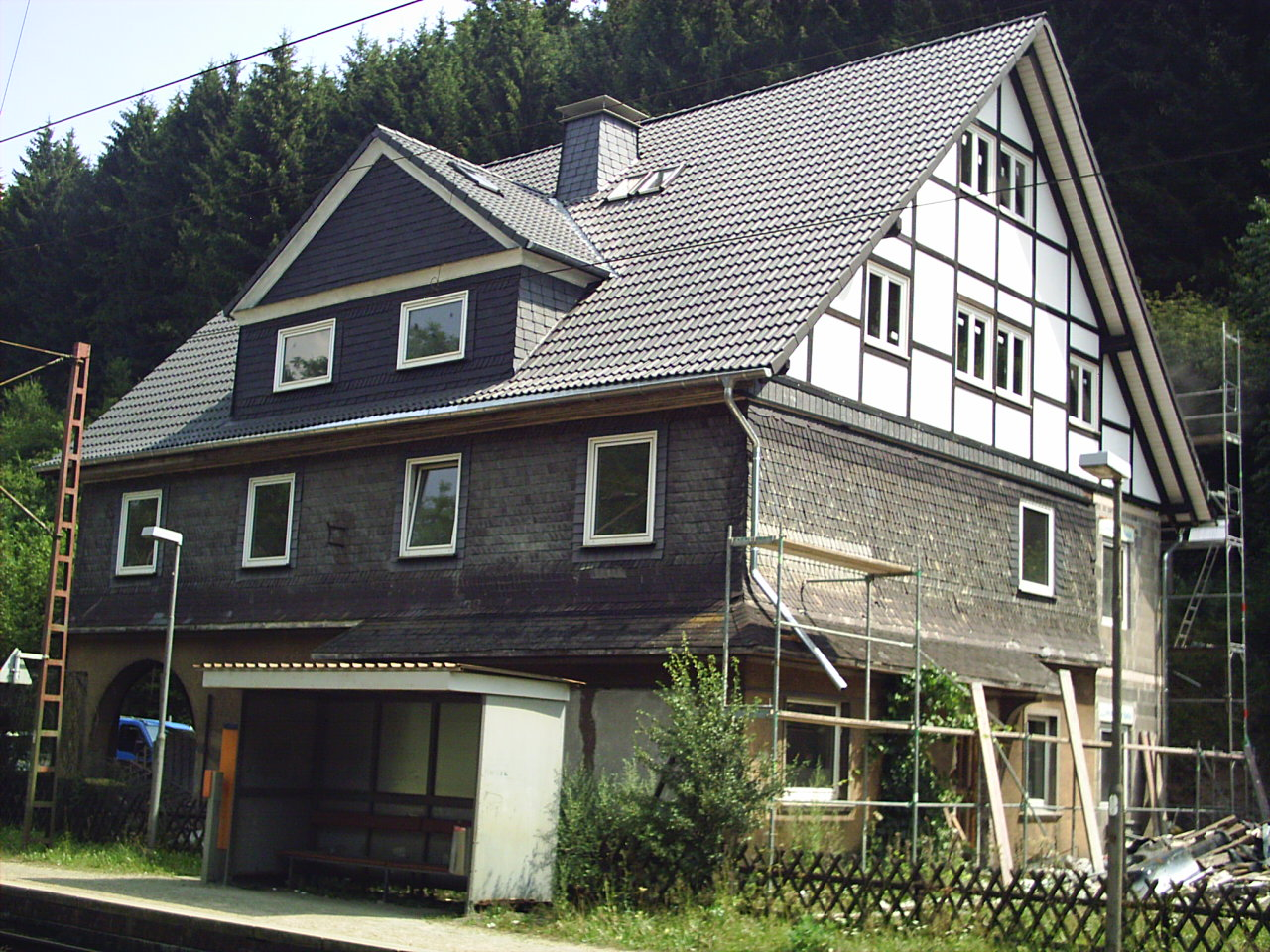
Station building in Kirchhundem

With the Kirchhundem and Welschen Ennest stations, Kirchhundem lies on the Ruhr-Sieg railway, which runs between Hagen and Siegen. Furthermore, buslines of the Verkehrsbetriebe Westfalen-Süd (VWS, "Westphalia-South Transport Services") and Busverkehr Ruhr-Sieg (BRS, "Ruhr-Sieg Bus Transport") run to Lennestadt, Olpe and Hilchenbach. Kirchhundem is located in the area of the fare association Westfalen-Tarif.

Bundesstraße 517 runs through the municipality.

=== Media ===
The Westfalenpost and the Westfälische Rundschau appear in Kirchhundem as daily newspapers. As well, the advertising sheets Sauerlandkurier and Sauerländer Wochenanzeiger come out on Wednesdays and Sundays.

Kirchhundem belongs to the Westdeutscher Rundfunk Siegen studio area. News from the South Sauerland is broadcast on WDR 2 and in local broadcasts on WDR Fernsehen.

=== Public institutions ===
Albaum is the seat of the Landesanstalt für Ökologie, Bodenordnung und Forsten NRW ("North Rhine-Westphalia State Institute for Ecology, Land Division and Forests"), fishery and waterway ecology department.

=== Businesses ===
- balcom electronic GmbH, electrical articles
- Bals Elektrotechnik GmbH & Co. KG, electrical articles
- Egon Behle GmbH & Co. KG, building company
- Gebr. Grünewald GmbH und Co. KG, papermaking
- Mennekes Elektrotechnik GmbH und Co. KG, electrical articles
- Straßen- und Tiefbau GmbH
- DURA Automotive in Selbecke, vehicle supplier

=== Education ===
==== Kindergartens and daycare ====
- Kindergarten "Kleine Strolche", Brachthausen
- Kindergarten "Wilma's Kuckucksnest" Heinsberg
- Kath. Kindergarten Hofolpe
- Kath. Kindergarten, Kirchhundem
- Kath. Kindergarten, Oberhundem
- Kath. Kindergarten, Welschen Ennest
- Montessori-Kinderhaus, Schwerpunkteinrichtung für Integration, Welschen Ennest
- Kindergarten "Rappelkiste", Würdinghausen

==== Primary schools ====
- St. Nikolaus, Brachthausen
- St. Katharina, Heinsberg
- St. Christophorus, Kirchhundem (open, all-day school)
- St. Lambertus, Oberhundem
- St. Johannes, Welschen Ennest
- Gemeinschaftsgrundschule, Würdinghausen

==== Hauptschulen ====
- Gemeinschaftshauptschule, Kirchhundem

==== Realschulen and Gymnasien ====
The municipality of Kirchhundem has no Realschulen or Gymnasien at its disposal. Instead, students must go to the ones in neighbouring Lennestadt and Olpe.

==== Post-secondary ====
Kirchhundem lies in the feeder area of the University of Siegen.

==== Music school ====
Musikschule Lennestadt-Kirchhundem

==== Educational institutions ====
- Institut für Lernen & Entwicklung. development of talents, attention training, creative learning. Dr. Judith Pasquale, Schlerreweg 1, Brachthausen.
- Josef-Gockeln-Haus der KAB, Josef-Gockeln-Str. 23, Rahrbach
- Jugendbildungsstätte Benolpe, Zur Nothelle 23, Benolpe
- Studienhaus Rüspe, Rüspe

==== Youth clubs ====
- Kleine offene Tür in Kirchhundem
- Jugendtreff der kath. Kirchengemeinde St. Peter und Paul, Kirchhundem
- Jugendtreff "Blue Ocean", Brachthausen (Catholic parish St. Mariae Heimsuchung Kohlhagen)
- Jugendtreff der kath. Kirchengemeinde Heinsberg
- Jugendtreff der evangelichen Kirchengemeinde Lennestadt-Kirchhundem, Würdinghausen
- Katholische Landjugendbewegung (KLJB), Welschen Ennest

=== Homes for the aged ===
- Alten- und Pflegeheim Haus Sauerland, Ortsteil Kirchhundem
- Seniorenheim Bremm'sche Stiftung, Ortsteil Silberg

== Notable residents ==
=== Honorary citizens ===
- Paul Josef Kardinal Cordes (born 5 September 1934 in Kirchhundem, main centre) is a Cardinal in the Roman Catholic Church, President of the papal council Cor Unum and is said to be one of the founding fathers of World Youth Day. On 24 November 2007 Pope Benedict XVI appointed him Cardinal Deacon with the titular diaconia of San Lorenzo in Piscibus in the College of Cardinals. Since 13 December 2007, Paul Josef Cardinal Cordes has been an honorary citizen of the municipality of Kirchhundem.
- Josef Schmelzer (born 30 July 1876 in Oberhundem; died 8 October 1962 in Oberhundem), known in his hometown simply as Tiennes Papa, was member of the Prussian Landtag (1920–1933), from September 1930 to July 1932 member of the German Reichstag for the Centre Party (Germany) and Member of the Landtag (1946–1950). He worked on the so-called Lex Schmelzer as part of the reforms to the dissolution of the Fideikommiss (an old fee tail law in Germany) and was a tireless promoter for development in the mountainous regions. He was also the initiator behind the building of the Rhein-Weser-Turm.
- Dr. Dr. h. c. Wilhelm Arnoldi (born 30 December 1884 in Siegen; died 18 April 1965 in Altenhundem) was a Centre Party politician and ministerial director from Altenhundem. As Prussian representative on the state board for agricultural emergency programmes, he safeguarded many local families during the Great Depression in the late 1920s, a livelihood in which he had an experimental station for birdlife conservation built near Altenhundem and also an experimental farm in what was then the municipality of Rahrbach. Furthermore, he was also the driving force behind the building of the viewing tower on the Hohe Bracht.

=== Sons and daughters of the municipality ===
- Jacob von Albaum, abbot of the Grafschaft Abbey
- Heinrich Bals (born 18 October 1868 in Oberalbaum; died after 1958), writer
- Dorothea Becker (born about 1536 in Kirchhundem; died May 1609 in Bilstein) survived a witch trial despite heavy torture.
- Paul Josef Cordes (born 5 September 1934 in Kirchhundem main centre), Cardinal
- Joachim Grünewald (born 21 November 1933 in Kirchhundem), politician (CDU)
- Ulla Hahn (born 30 April 1946 in Brachthausen), writer
- Johannes Hatzfeld (born 14 April 1882 in Benolpe; died 5 July 1953 in Paderborn), musician
- Chrysologus Heimes (born 2 April 1765 in Oberhundem; died 2 May 1835 in Reiste), organ expert
- Kerstin Jürgens (born 19 December 1977), skeleton competitor
- Wilhelm Liese (born 27 April 1876 in Würdinghausen; died 19 March 1956 in Paderborn), Catholic priest, writer, editor and archivist.
- Benedikt Lindemann, abbot
- Ina-Maria Mihályhegyi-Witthaut (born 20 March 1946 in Kirchhundem; died 5 October 1987 in Siegen), artist
- Mediatrix Nies, Superior General of the Sisterhood of Olpe Franciscans
- Helmut Josef Patt (born 23 July 1926 in Flape; died 11 June 2003 in Lippstadt), clergyman
- Hartmut Schauerte (born 13 September 1944 in Kirchhundem), politician
- Johann Friedrich Joseph Sommer (born 26 January 1793 in Kirchhundem; died 13 November 1856 in Arnsberg), lawyer
- Heinrich Steinhoff (born about 1550 in Würdinghausen; died 20 October 1611), abbot of the Grafschaft Monastery
- Willi Weiskirch (born 1923 in Welschen Ennest; died 1996 in Lennestadt), Wehrbeauftragter (≈ armed forces commissioner) of the German Bundestag
- Petra Weschollek, biathlete

=== Famous people connected with the municipality ===
- Johann Adolf von Fürstenberg (born 16 March 1631 in Cologne; died 15 April 1704 in Herdringen), Capitular in Münster, Hildesheim and Paderborn, Drost of the Ämter of Bilstein, Fredeburg and Waldenburg, builder of the Adolfsburg near Oberhundem.
- Heinrich Luhmann (born 22 December 1890 in Hultrop, died 6 May 1978 in Hamm), writer. In his novels Wo die Wälder Wache halten ("Where the Forests Keep Watch", 1920) and Walddoktor Willibald ("Forest Doctor Willibald", 1921) Lumann describes life in fictional villages in the Rüspe Forest, which lies in today's municipality of Kirchhundem.
