= Paul Josef Cordes =

German cardinal (1934–2024)

His Eminence Paul Josef Cordes
- President Emeritus of the Pontifical Council "Cor Unum"
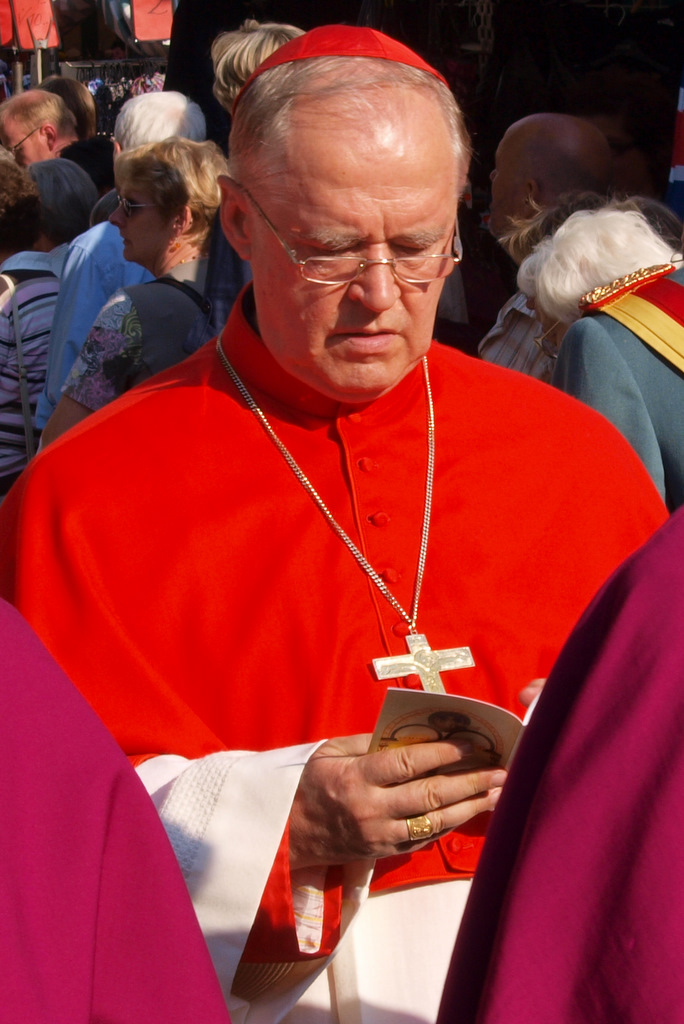
- Cordes in 2009
- Appointed: 2 December 1995
- In office: 2 December 1995 – 7 October 2010
- Predecessor: Roger Marie Élie Etchegaray
- Successor: Robert Sarah
- Other post: Cardinal-Priest of S. Lorenzo in Piscibus "pro hac vice" (2018–2024)
- Previous posts: Titular Bishop of Naissus (1975–1995); Auxiliary Bishop of Paderborn (1975); Vice President of the Pontifical Council for the Laity (1980–1995); Titular Archbishop of Naissus (1995–2007)

Orders
- Ordination: 21 December 1961 by Lorenz Jaeger
- Consecration: 1 February 1976 by Johannes Joachim Degenhardt
- Created cardinal: 24 November 2007 by Pope Benedict XVI
- Rank: Cardinal-Deacon (2007–2018); Cardinal-Priest (2018–2024)

Personal details
- Born: Paul Josef Cordes; 5 September 1934 Kirchhundem, Gau Westphalia-South, Germany
- Died: 15 March 2024 (aged 89) Rome, Italy
- Denomination: Roman Catholic
- Motto: Deus fidelis
- Coat of arms

Styles of Paul Cordes
- Reference style: His Eminence
- Spoken style: Your Eminence
- Informal style: Cardinal
- See: none

Paul Josef Cordes (5 September 1934 – 15 March 2024) was a German cardinal of the Roman Catholic Church. He served as president of the Pontifical Council Cor Unum (1995–2010) and was elevated to the rank of cardinal in 2007.

== Biography ==
=== Youth ===
Cordes was born in Kirchhundem on 5 September 1934, and graduated from the Gymnasium of Attendorn in 1955. He studied medicine for two semesters in Münster, and philosophy at the Philosophical Faculty of Paderborn as well as in Lyon, France. After studying at the Faculty of Theology Paderborn, Cordes attended the University of Mainz, where he was also an assistant to Professor Karl Lehmann; Cordes was also the first student to defend his thesis ("Sendung zum Dienst. Exegetisch-historische und systematische Studien zum Konzilsdekret 'Über Leben und Dienst der Priester'", 1971).

=== Priest ===
Cordes was ordained to the priesthood by Archbishop Lorenz Jäger on 21 December 1961. He then served as prefect of Studienheim Sankt Klemens for late vocations of the dioceses of Paderborn and Münster until 1966. From 1966 to 1969, Cordes was Prefect of Collegium Leonium, the archdiocesan seminary of Paderborn. In 1972, he was called to the secretariat of the Episcopal Conference of Germany, where he served as relator for pastoral affairs.

=== Bishop ===
On 27 October 1975, Cordes was appointed Auxiliary bishop of Paderborn and Titular Bishop of Naissus by Pope Paul VI. He received his episcopal consecration on 1 February 1976 from Archbishop Johannes Joachim Degenhardt, with Cardinal Julius Döpfner and Bishop Paul Nordhues serving as co-consecrators, in the Cathedral of Paderborn. Cordes was later named an honorary canon of the cathedral chapter on 20 July 1980.

Cordes entered the service of the Roman Curia upon his appointment as vice-president of the Pontifical Council for the Laity on 11 March 1980. On 2 December 1995, Cordes was made President of Pontifical Council Cor Unum, and he was raised to the rank of archbishop. He served as a special papal envoy to the peoples of Nicaragua, El Salvador, Honduras, and Guatemala, when they were struck by Hurricane Mitch from 29 November to 3 December 1998.

=== Cardinal ===
Pope Benedict XVI created him Cardinal-Deacon of S. Lorenzo in Piscibus in the consistory of 24 November 2007.

On 12 June 2008, in addition to his main duties he was appointed by Benedict as a member of congregations in the Roman Curia; these are the Congregation for the Causes of Saints, the Congregation for the Clergy, the Congregation for the Evangelization of Peoples, and the Pontifical Council for Justice and Peace. In November 2010 he was also appointed a member of the Congregation for Bishops. He ceased to be a member of these dicasteries on reaching 80 on 5 September 2014.

=== Death ===
Cordes died in Rome on 15 March 2024, at the age of 89.

== Views ==
In an article in the Catholic Herald, Cordes argued that secularization came from the early 17th century British idea that democracy should be handled as a religious and moral principle, in line with the Reformation idea of the priesthood of all believers. He argued that such a principle would be fatal to the Church if the laymen-centered theology of the Second Vatican Council were to be applied in a similar way. He claimed the German press tried to turn the Williamson affair into a Benedict affair.

== Bibliography ==
- Paul Josef Cordes (2018), Why Priests? Answers Guided by the Teaching of Pope Benedict XVI, Princeton, Scepter Publishers, 228 pgs. ISBN 978-1-59417-086-7

Catholic Church titles
Preceded by Victor Hugo Martínez Contreras	— TITULAR — Titular Bishop of Naissus; 27 October 1975 – 2 December 1995	Himself as Titular Archbishop
Himself as Titular Bishop	— TITULAR — Titular Archbishop of Naissus; 2 December 1995 – 24 November 2007	Succeeded by Ambrose Madtha
Preceded by Lucas Moreira Neves	Secretary of the Pontifical Council for the Laity; 11 March 1980 – 2 December 1995	Succeeded by Stanisław Ryłko
Preceded by Roger Etchegaray	President of the Pontifical Council Cor Unum; 2 December 1995 – 7 October 2010	Succeeded by Robert Sarah
Titular church established	Cardinal-Deacon of San Lorenzo in Piscibus; 24 November 2007 – 19 May 2018	Himself as Cardinal-Priest
Himself as Cardinal-Deacon	Cardinal-Priest 'pro hac vice' of San Lorenzo in Piscibus; 19 May 2018 – 15 March 2024	Vacant
