= San Lorenzo in Piscibus =

Church of Saint Lawrence in Piscibus
- Ecclesia Sancti Laurentii in Piscibus (in Latin)
- Chiesa di San Lorenzo in Piscibus (in Italian)
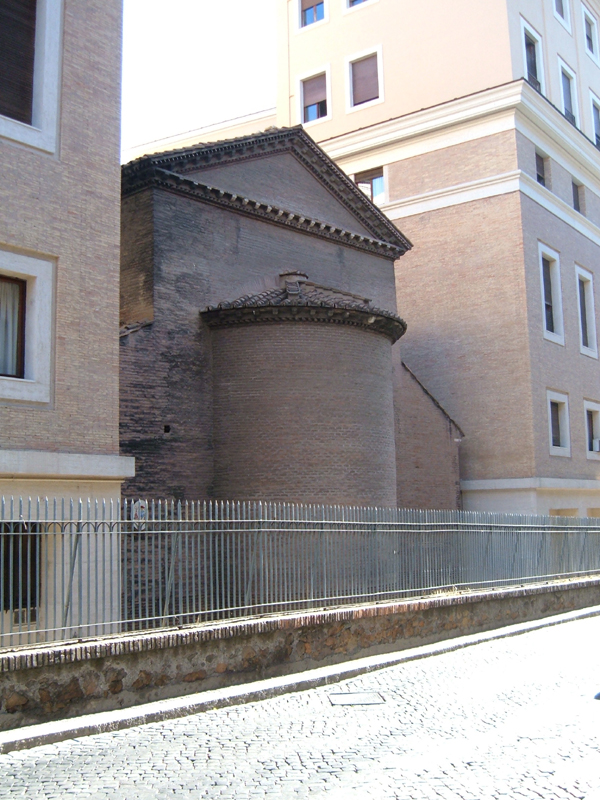
- The apse of the church as visible from Borgo Santo Spirito
- Click on the map for a fullscreen view
- 41°54′6″N 12°27′33″E
- Location: Via P. Pancrazio Pfeiffer 24, Rome
- Country: Italy
- Denomination: Roman Catholic
- Tradition: Roman Rite

History
- Status: Titular church
- Dedication: Saint Lawrence
- Consecrated: 1983 (reconsecrated)

Architecture
- Architect: Domenico Navona
- Architectural type: Church
- Style: Romanesque
- Groundbreaking: 12th century
- Completed: 17th century

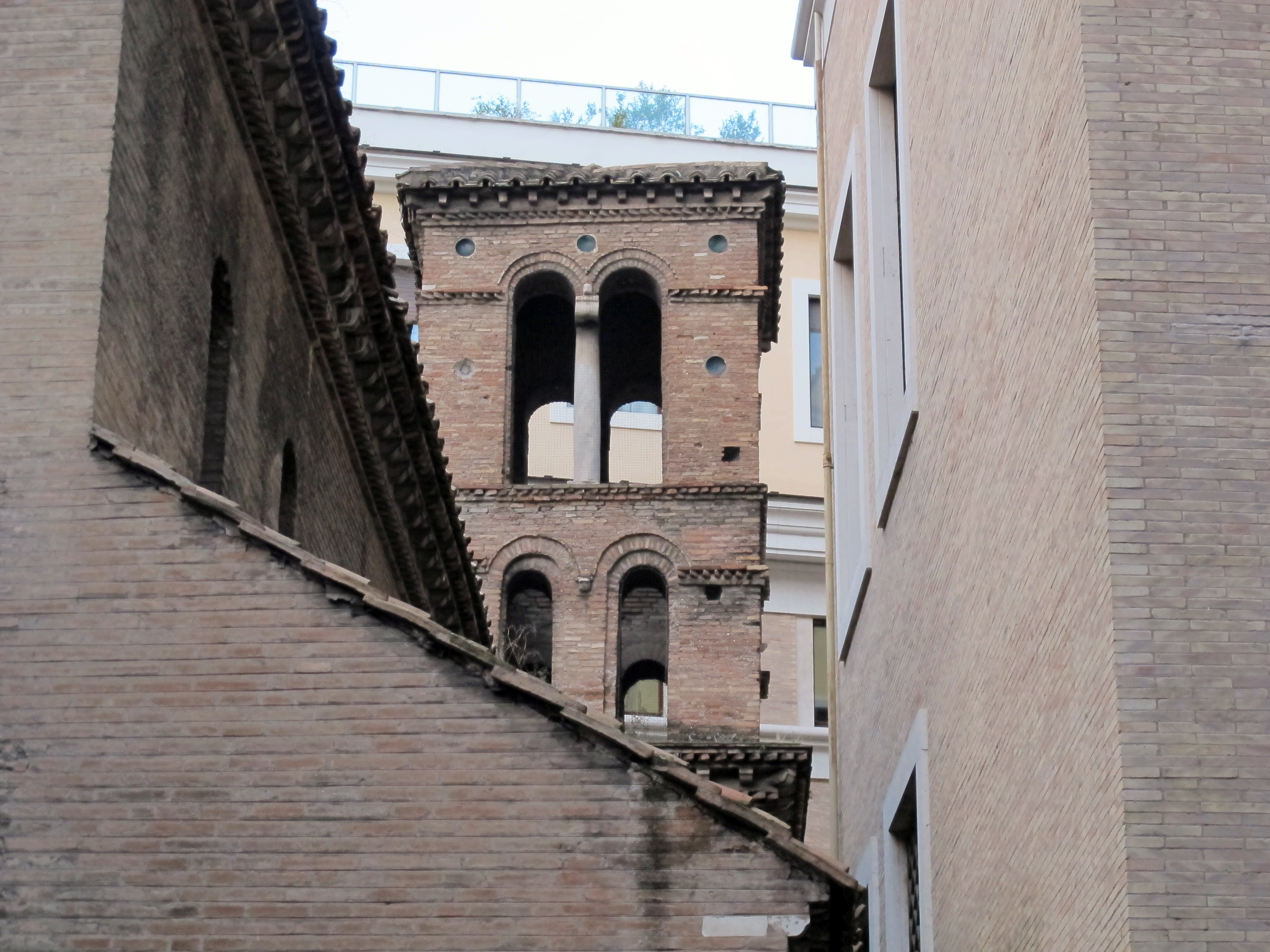
View of the campanile

The Church of San Lorenzo in Piscibus (English: Saint Lawrence at the Fish Market) is a 12th-century small church in the Borgo rione of Rome. It is located near Saint Peter's Square and Vatican City, but its façade is not visible from the main street, Via della Conciliazione.

== Name ==
The church's dedication is to Saint Lawrence, the Roman deacon martyr. The first document to reference it dates to 1143, at which time it was referred to as S. Laurentius in porticu maiore ("Saint Lawrence near the great portico"), referring to its vicinity to the great Portico which in the Middle Ages connected Pons Aelius with the Old St. Peter's Basilica, stretching along the Borgo. The title in piscibus, which first appeared in a 1205 bull of Pope Innocent III, translates literally to "near the fishes". The name refers either to a fish market that was operated nearby, or the Roman de Piscibus family. Other variants on the church's name are de piscibus ("of the fishes"), ad pisces ("near the fishes"), and in Borgo ("in the Borgo", the neighborhood in which it was – and still is – located). It was also called San Lorenzolo or Lorenzino, both meaning "little Saint Lawrence", to stress its tiny size.

== History ==
=== Early traditions ===
There is a tradition that the current church was built on the site of a church dedicated to Saint Stephen or Saint Galla of Rome, a widow of the sixth century. That ancient structure, which housed a monastery for religious women, was probably destroyed during the barbarian invasions. It was later rebuilt in honor of Saint Lawrence.

=== Medieval and Renaissance period ===
The mention of the church in 1143 is in the Ordo Romanus of Benedict the Canon. In the 13th and 14th centuries it fell under the care of the Lateran Basilica, as reported in an inventory put together by Nicola Frangipani during the reign of Pope Boniface VIII (1294-1303). There it is referred to by the name Saint Lawrence in piscibus, with an additional descriptor establishing its geographical location: "in the Leonine City, next to the portico of the Basilica of the Prince of the Apostles" (in civitate Leoniana iuxta Porticum Basilicae Principis Apostolorum).

In the Middle Ages the governance of the church was transferred to the canons of the Vatican Basilica, as attested in bulls of Innocent III (October 15, 1205) and Pope Gregory IX (June 22, 1228). The church was renovated in 1417, according to a document in the archive of Saint Peter's, but the source is confused as to who carried it out. Ottavio Panciroli attributes the repairs to an English cardinal by the name of "Tommaso Armellini"—possibly a reference to Thomas Langley—but Hülsen considers it a confused reference to Francesco Armellini, Cardinal Camerlengo under Pope Leo X.

The church housed Poor Clares for some time, before Leo X moved them elsewhere. He replaced them with a lay community from the nearby Church of Santo Spirito in Sassia. It was during this period that the church's structure, whose facade lay at the south side of Piazza Rusticucci after its confluence with the Borgo Vecchio road, (both have been destroyed in 1936–37 during the destruction of the spina dei Borghi), was incorporated into the nearby palazzi of noble families and more or less became a private chapel of the Cesi family, which owned the nearby palazzo. The shrine was heavily reworked in the Baroque style in 1659 by the architect Francesco Massan, an associate of Borromini's. In the same year, the church came into the possession of the order of the Piarists, which later had a double entrance façade added. This façade, now completely gone, was designed by the architect Domenico Navona in 1733.

=== Decline and deconsecration ===
The church was held by the Piarist fathers into the early 20th century. The church underwent major changes when the central part of the Borgo neighborhood, the Spina di Borgo, was demolished in order to construct the modern Via della Conciliazione. During the course of construction, which spanned about a decade from 1936 to 1950, the church's façade was entirely removed and the building hidden inside the yard of the left propylea which delimits Piazza Pio XII. At the same time, a substantial renovation was carried out inside. The architects, Galeazzi and Prandi, initially tried to save the Baroque decoration, but because of the enormous expense and the threat of collapse decided on restoring the church to its supposedly original Romanesque condition, erasing all later additions and stripping it of the Baroque ornamentation.

The church was sold by the Italian government to the Holy See in 1941. It was, however, consequently deconsecrated, having been declared redundant. It was afterward converted into a study hall for the Scuola Pontificia Pio IX, and later used as a studio for the sculptor Pericle Fazzini, who used it while working on his massive "Resurrection" piece for the Paul VI Audience Hall between 1970 and 1977.

=== Restitution and current use ===
Pope John Paul II saw the old church—by then more or less forgotten, being hidden by the modern propylea around Piazza Pio XII—as a potential site for a youth ministry center at the Vatican. He reconsecrated it with a special youth Mass in March 1983, expressing the desire that the church become "a hothouse of faith-filled evangelization." The church continues to house the Centro San Lorenzo, which is overseen by the Pontifical Council for the Laity.

On 24 November 2007, it was designated a titular deaconry by Pope Benedict XVI and given to Paul Cardinal Cordes.

The church is today listed as a subsidiary worship site of the parish of Santa Maria in Traspontina.

== Architecture ==
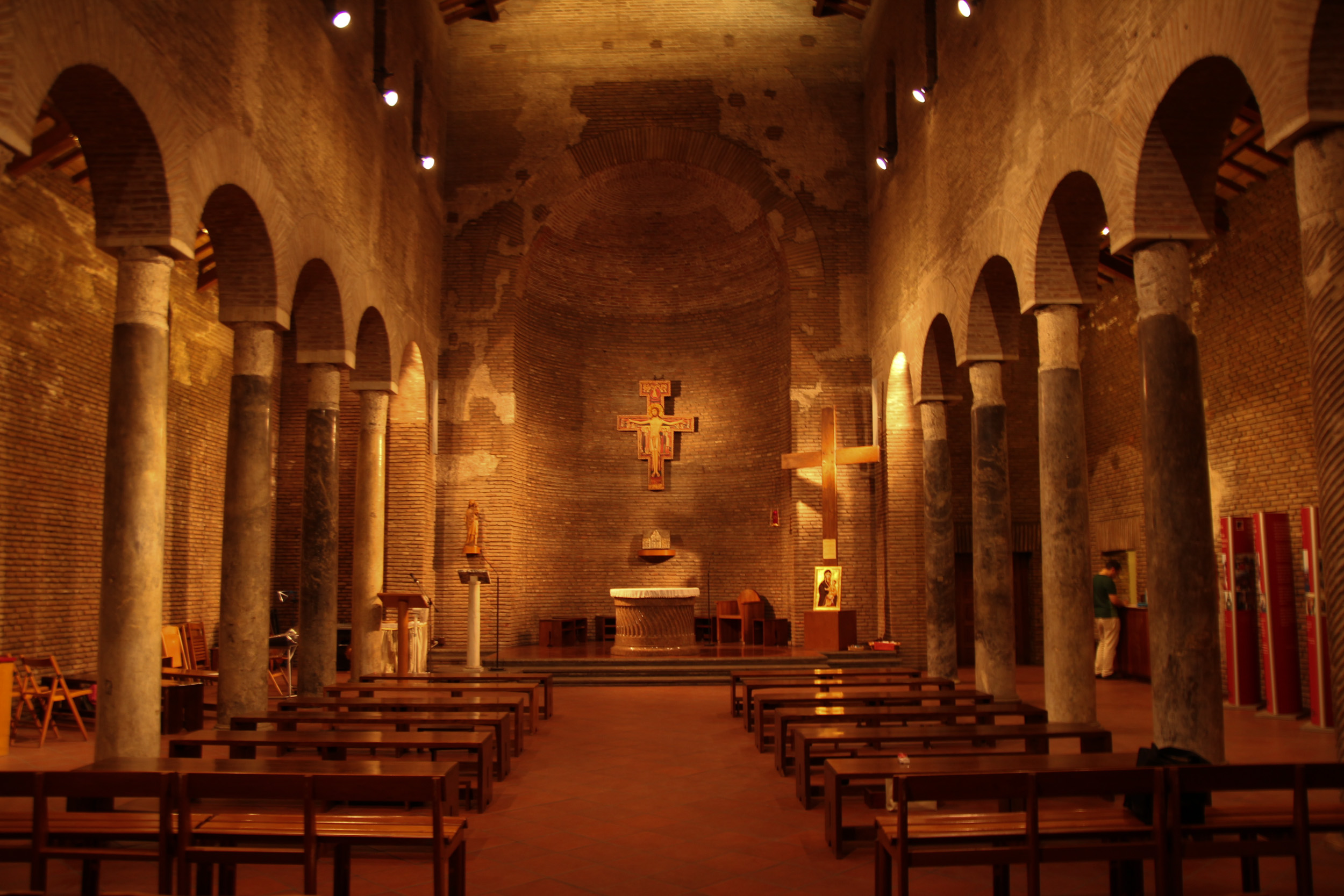
The spolia columns and exposed brick of the Romanesque interior

The interior of the church is divided into three naves, separated by twelve spoliated columns of grey marble. The roof is of wooden trusses, and the nave and apse are of exposed brick. A small, slender Romanesque bell tower of the twelfth century survives to the left of the façade and stands on a square plan with tall mullioned windows, with pillars on the lower level and small columns in the belfry.

Above the high altar, there used to be a painting depicting the Marriage of the Virgin by Niccolò Bertoni, a student of Carlo Maratta.

== Cardinal-Deacons ==
- Paul Josef Cordes (24 November 2007 – 15 March 2024)
