= Roger Etchegaray =

French Catholic cardinal (1922–2019)

His Eminence Roger Etchegaray
- Vice-Dean of the College of Cardinals
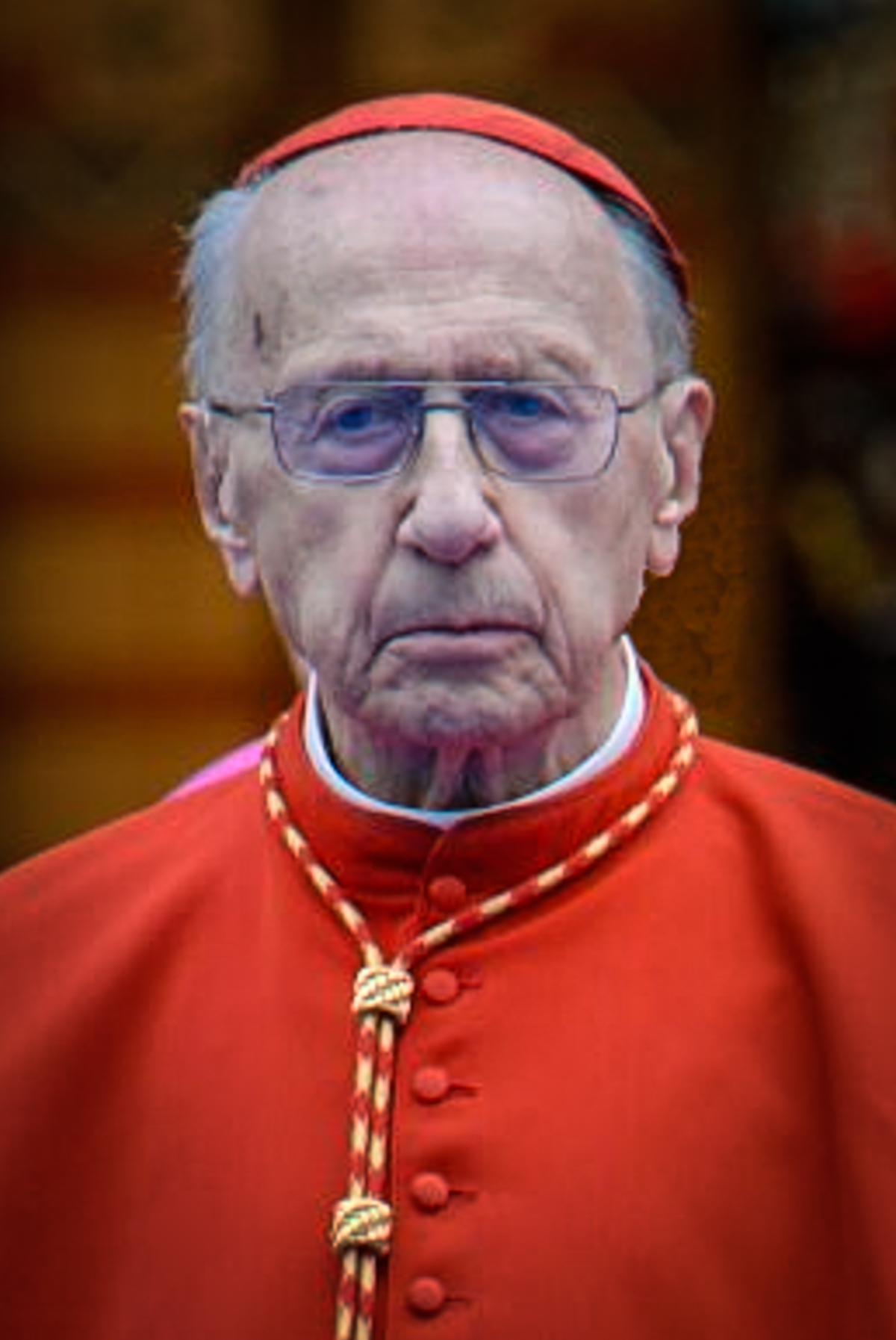
- Cardinal Roger Etchegaray in Sarajevo, 2012
- Appointed: 8 April 1984
- Term ended: 24 June 1998
- Predecessor: Agostino Casaroli
- Other post: Cardinal-Bishop of Porto-Santa Rufina (1998–2019)
- Previous posts: Auxiliary Bishop of Paris (1969–1970); Titular Bishop of Gemellae in Numidia (1969–1970); Archbishop of Marseille (1970–1985); Prelate of Mission de France (1975–1982); Cardinal Priest of San Leone I (1979–1998); President of the Pontifical Council Cor Unum (1984–1995); Vice-Dean of the College of Cardinals (2005–2017)

Orders
- Ordination: 13 July 1947 by Jean Saint-Pierre
- Consecration: 27 May 1969 by François Marty
- Created cardinal: 30 June 1979 by Pope John Paul II
- Rank: Cardinal-Bishop (previously Cardinal-Priest)

Personal details
- Born: Roger Marie Élie Etchegaray; 25 September 1922 Espelette, France
- Died: 4 September 2019 (aged 96) Cambo-les-Bains, France
- Denomination: Catholic Church

Roger Marie Élie Etchegaray (French pronunciation: [ʁɔʒe ɛtʃɛɡaʁaj]; 25 September 1922 – 4 September 2019) was a French cardinal of the Catholic Church. Etchegaray served as the Archbishop of Marseille from 1970 to 1985 before entering the Roman Curia, where he served as President of the Pontifical Council for Justice and Peace (1984–1998) and President of the Pontifical Council Cor Unum (1984–1995). He was elevated to the rank of cardinal in 1979, and was the longest-serving cardinal never to attend a papal conclave.

He served as papal representative in delicate situations. Some were ecclesiastical, like improving relations with the Orthodox Patriarch Alexy II of Moscow, organizing an historic inter-religious prayer service in Assisi in 1986, and seeking rapprochement with Communist governments. Others were geopolitical, attempting to prevent international violence, arranging an exchange of prisoners, or bearing witness to the Rwandan genocide against the Tutsis.

== Biography ==
=== Early life and ordination ===
Etchegaray, of Basque ancestry, was born in the Northern Basque Country to Jean-Baptiste and Aurélie Etchegaray. The eldest of three children, he had two younger siblings, Jean and Maïté; their father worked as an agricultural mechanic. All his life he spoke French with the accent of his native region.

He attended the minor seminary in Ustaritz and the major seminary in Bayonne before studying at the Pontifical Gregorian University in Rome, from where he obtained a Licentiate of Sacred Theology and a Doctorate of Canon Law. He was ordained to the priesthood by Bishop Jean Saint-Pierre on 13 July 1947.

=== Priest and bishop ===
Etchegaray then did pastoral work in the Diocese of Bayonne, also serving as secretary to Bishop Léon-Albert Terrier, secretary general of the diocesan works of Catholic Action, and as vicar general. He then served as deputy director (1961–1966) and later secretary general (1966–1970) of the French Episcopal Conference.

On 29 March 1969, Etchegaray was appointed Auxiliary Bishop of Paris and Titular Bishop of Gemellae in Numidia by Pope Paul VI. He received his episcopal consecration on the following 27 May from Cardinal François Marty, with Cardinal Paul Gouyon and Bishop Władysław Rubin serving as co-consecrators, at Notre-Dame de Paris cathedral.

After the first meeting between Church and Freemasonry which had been held on 11 April 1969 at the convent of the Divine Master in Ariccia, he was the protagonist of a series of public handshakes between high prelates of the Roman Catholic Church and the heads of Freemasonry.

=== Archbishop and cardinal ===
Styles of Roger Etchegaray
- Reference style: His Eminence
- Spoken style: Your Eminence
- Informal style: Cardinal
- See: Porto-Santa Rufina (suburbicarian)

Etchegaray was named Archbishop of Marseille on 22 December 1970 and served until 1984, when he took up assignments in the Roman Curia. He was twice elected president of the Conference of French Bishops, serving from 1975 to 1981. On 8 April 1984, Pope John Paul II named him President of the Pontifical Council Cor Unum and President of the Pontifical Council for Justice and Peace. He held the first of those positions until 2 December 1995 and the other until 24 June 1998. In Rome he lived in the Palazzo San Callisto, a Vatican property in Trastevere.

He was made Cardinal-Priest of San Leone I by Pope John Paul II in the consistory of 30 June 1979. On 24 June 1998 he was appointed Cardinal Bishop of Porto-Santa Rufina. Etchegaray was elected Vice-Dean of the College of Cardinals and served from 30 April 2005 until 10 June 2017, when he was relieved from the duties of his position at his own request.

== Diplomatic roles ==
Popes Paul VI and John Paul II used Etchegaray as a diplomatic agent even when he was still Archbishop of Marseille and before he had Curial titles associated with human rights. He visited Eastern Europe on their behalf several times in the 1970s. In 1980 he became the first cardinal to visit China and visited again in 1993. He improved the relations with the Orthodox Patriarch Alexy II of Moscow. He was a key organizer among others of the first World Day of Prayer for Peace that brought together more than 160 religious leaders in Assisi on 27 October 1986. It was the broadest representation of international religious leaders ever assembled.

=== Cuba ===
Etchegaray made his first trip to Cuba in 1989 and spent nine days there, between Christmas and New Year's Day. His Cuban tour was capped by a meeting with Fidel Castro during Christmas week at which Etchegaray underlined the social contribution the Church provided to the Cuban health service, the pride of the Cuban regime.

The meeting underscored an easing of tensions between Church and state in the officially atheist country, where practicing Christians, Jews, and Muslims have been objects of government repression for almost 30 years.

=== Catholic–Orthodox relations ===
In 2006, the Catholic Church, again through Cardinal Etchegaray, gave the Greek Orthodox Church another relic of St. Andrew.

=== Iran–Iraq War ===
In December 1985, he led a Vatican team invited by Ayatollah Ruhollah Khomeini to visit prisoners of war held in Iran. He visited Baghdad in 1985 when he helped to arrange an exchange of prisoners of war between Iran and Iraq while they were at war. In 1998, he visited Baghdad to determine if a papal visit was feasible.

=== Rwandan genocide ===
He first visited Rwanda in 1993 in an attempt to reconcile the warring parties. In June 1994, amidst the violence of the Rwandan genocide, he visited the site where three bishops were assassinated and officiated at their funeral. He crossed the country to deliver the same message to the government and its rebel opposition.

=== U.S. invasion of Iraq ===
The Vatican opposed the 2003 U.S. invasion of Iraq and sent Cardinal Etchegaray as an envoy to persuade Iraqi authorities to cooperate with the United Nations in order to avoid war.

== Awards ==
In 2003 he received the journalistic prize Golden Doves for Peace awarded by the Italian Research Institute Archivio Disarmo.

- Knight Grand Cross of the Legion of Honour
- Commander in the National Order of Merit (France)

== Health ==
=== Injuries sustained during papal attack ===
On 24 December 2009, Cardinal Etchegaray was knocked down along with Pope Benedict XVI when 25-year-old Susanna Maiolo jumped over a barrier and grappled with the Pope, who was making his way through St Peter's Basilica in procession for Christmas Eve Mass. The Pope was not injured, but Etchegaray suffered a broken leg and a broken hip. He had been standing a few yards away from the Pope and was knocked down in the scuffle. The Vatican said Maiolo was "psychologically unstable" and had lunged at the Pope previously.

In 2015, Etchegaray fell in St. Peter's Basilica during Mass and broke his leg for the second time.

=== Return to France and death ===
Etchegaray returned to Bayonne, France, in January 2017, to live with his sister Maité (d. 13 February 2018) in a retirement home in Cambo-les-Bains near Espelette, the village where he was born. Catholic News Agency journalist Andrea Gagliarducci described Cardinal Etchegary's retirement from Rome as "the end of an era". He had farewell meetings with Pope Francis and Pope Emeritus Benedict XVI before he left. Pope Francis accepted his resignation as Vice Dean of the College of Cardinals on 10 June 2017.

Etchegaray died on 4 September 2019, at age 96. At the time of his death he was the oldest living cardinal, following the death of Cardinal Pimiento Rodriguez one day earlier on 3 September 2019. Etchegaray was the longest-serving cardinal not to participate in a papal conclave. (Note: On 26 November 2008 he overtook Giacomo Antonelli, secretary of state to Pope Pius IX, who was a cardinal for 29 years during the 31-year pontificate of Pius IX. Both Antonelli's and Etchegaray's non-participation in conclaves was not by choice because there was no conclave that either of them could freely and legally attend. The comparison is inexact because Antonelli was eligible to participate in a conclave until his death. Etchegaray on the other hand, lost his eligibility on his 80th birthday when he had been a cardinal for a little more than 23 years. Also, no conclave was held during Antonelli's cardinalate, while Etchegaray was actually excluded from participating in the conclaves of 2005 and 2013.)

== Notes ==
Catholic Church titles
Preceded by Georges Jacquot	Archbishop of Marseille; 22 December 1970 – 13 April 1985	Succeeded by Robert Coffy
Preceded by Bernardin Gantin	President of the Pontifical Council Cor Unum; 8 April 1984 – 2 December 1995	Succeeded by Paul Josef Cordes
Preceded by Bernardin Gantin	President of the Pontifical Council for Justice and Peace; 8 April 1984 – 24 June 1998	Succeeded by Nguyen Van Thuan
Preceded by Angelo Sodano	Sub-Dean of the College of Cardinals; 30 April 2005 – 10 June 2017	Succeeded by Giovanni Battista Re
Preceded by Agostino Casaroli	Cardinal-Bishop of Porto-Santa Rufina; 24 June 1998 – 4 September 2019	Succeeded by Beniamino Stella
Records
Preceded by José de Jesús Pimiento Rodríguez	Oldest living Member of the Sacred College; 3–4 September 2019	Succeeded by Albert Vanhoye, S.J.
