= Susanna Maiolo =

Swiss-Italian woman (born 1984)

Susanna Maiolo (born 8 November 1984) is a Swiss-Italian woman who twice attempted to attack Pope Benedict XVI. The first attack, in December 2008, was intercepted successfully by members of the Pontifical Swiss Guard. The second attack, on 24 December 2009, happened during the procession to the Christmas Eve Midnight Mass inside St. Peter's Basilica, where she knocked the Pope and French cardinal Roger Etchegaray to the floor, breaking the cardinal's leg and hip, and leaving the Pope uninjured.

== Early life ==
Maiolo was born in Frauenfeld, Switzerland. She has both Italian and Swiss citizenship.

== Attacks ==
The first attack in December 2008 was intercepted successfully by the Pope's bodyguards. Then, on Christmas Eve, 24 December 2009, during the Entrance Procession to the Midnight Mass, inside St. Peter's Basilica, she knocked the Pope and French cardinal Roger Etchegaray to the floor, breaking the cardinal's leg and hip, and leaving the Pope uninjured. Authorities said that Maiolo is mentally unwell and she was held for a week's evaluation at a psychiatric hostel in Subiaco near Rome. It was reported that she was unarmed, did not want to injure the Pope, and the Pope has forgiven her.

== Reactions ==
The Pope's personal secretary, Monsignor Georg Gaenswein, visited her at the clinic on 1 January 2010. He expressed the Pope's concern for her and said the Pope believed in her good intentions and had pardoned her. The Vatican public prosecutor Nicola Picardi and spokesman Federico Lombardi said that she would probably be released.

Maiolo and two of her family members had a brief private audience with Pope Benedict after the morning general audience on 13 January 2010 in a room adjoining the Paul VI Audience Hall. Maiolo told the Pope she regretted the incident. He forgave her and expressed his best wishes for her and her health.
