= Pontifical Council Cor Unum =

Roman Catholic church body (1971–2016)

The Pontifical Council Cor Unum (One Heart) for Human and Christian Development was a pontifical council of the Roman Curia of the Catholic Church from 1971 to 2016.

== History ==
Cor Unum was established by Pope Paul VI on 15 July 1971. It was based in the Palazzo San Callisto, located on the Piazza San Callisto in Rome.

In 2005, the Pope charged the Cor Unum to bring its charitable resources to the victims of Hurricane Katrina in Florida.

On 1 January 2017, Pope Francis disbanded Cor Unum as part of his reorganization of the Roman Curia, giving its responsibilities to the Dicastery for Promoting Integral Human Development.

== Description ==
Paul VI explained the naming of Cor Unum in 1972:

"So we were able to give your ecclesial action for aid the name of one heart, a heart that beats in rhythm with the heart of Christ, whose pity for the hungry multitudes reaches them even in their spiritual hunger".

The mission of Cor Unum was "the care of the Catholic Church for the needy, thereby encouraging human fellowship and making manifest the charity of Christ", (Apostolic Constitution Pastor bonus, art. 145). It was designed to carry out humanitarian relief operations following disasters, with the aim of fostering charity and encouraging cooperation and coordination of other Catholic organizations.

In 1984, Pope John Paul II established the John Paul II Foundation for the Sahel, to be run by Cor Unum. Its job was to combat drought and desertification in the Sahel Region of Africa. It also established the Populorum Progressio Foundation, which worked with indigenous peoples in the Caribbean and Latin America.

== Officials ==
In 2009, Cor Unum had 38 members, six consultors and a permanent staff of ten. The pope appointed the president, secretary, under-secretary, council members and consultors for five-year terms.

=== Presidents ===
- Cardinal Jean Villot (15 July 1971 – 4 September 1978) (France)
- Cardinal Bernardin Gantin (4 September 1978 – 8 April 1984) (Benin)
- Cardinal Roger Etchegaray (8 April 1984 – 2 December 1995) (France)
- Cardinal Paul Josef Cordes (2 December 1995 – 7 October 2010) (Germany)
- Cardinal Robert Sarah (7 October 2010 – 24 November 2014) (Guinea)

=== Vice-presidents ===
- Bishop Ramón Torrella Cascante (1971.07.22 – 1975.12.20) (Spain)
- Cardinal Bernardin Gantin (1976 – 1978.09.04) (Benin)
- Archbishop Alfredo Bruniera (1978.11.06 – 1981) (Italy)
- Archbishop Alois Wagner (1981.10.12 – 1999.07.08) (Austria)

=== Secretaries ===
- Father Henri de Riedmatten, O.P. (1971 – 1979) (Switzerland)
- Father Roger du Noyer, M.E.P. (1979 – 1988) (France)
- Iván Antonio Marín López (1992 – 1997.04.19) (Colombia)
- Monsignor Karel Kasteel (1998.03.28 – 2009.06.02) (Netherlands)
- Monsignor Giovanni Pietro Dal Toso (2010.06.22 – 2017.01.01) (Italy)

=== Under-secretaries ===
- Father Lajos Kada (1972 – 1975.06.20) (Hungary)
- Father Roger du Noyer, M.E.P. (1975 – 1979) (France)
- Father Henri Forest, S.J. (1979 – 1987)
- Iván Antonio Marín López (1987 – 1992) (Colombia)
- Monsignor Karel Kasteel (1992 – 1998.03.28) (Netherlands)
- Monsignor Francisco Azcona San Martín (1998 – 2003) (Spain)
- Monsignor Giovanni Pietro Dal Toso (2004.06.21 – 2010.06.22) (Italy)
- Monsignor Segundo Tejado Muñoz (2011.01.05 – 2017.01.01)

== External links and sources ==
- Pontifical Council Cor Unum
