= Kreuztal station =

Railway station in Kreuztal, Germany

Kreuztal
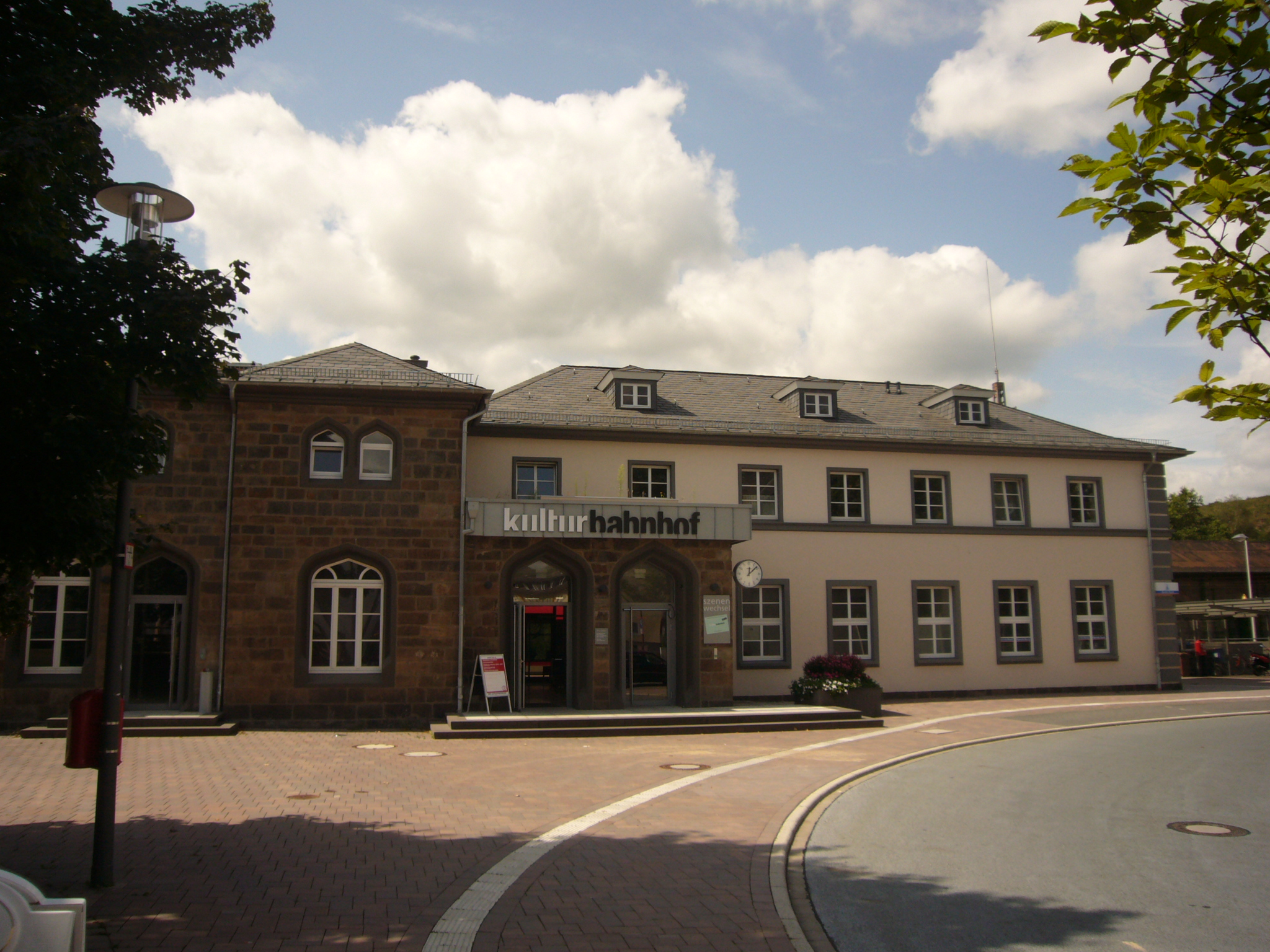
- Entrance building

General information
- Location: Bahnhofstraße 11, Kreuztal, NRW; Germany
- Coordinates: 50°57′22″N 7°59′31″E
- Lines: Kreuztal–Cölbe railway; Ruhr-Sieg railway
- Platforms: 3

Construction
- Accessible: Yes

Other information
- Station code: 3420
- DS100 code: EKT
- IBNR: 8000214
- Category: 4
- Fare zone: Westfalentarif: 81004
- Website: www.bahnhof.de

History
- Opened: 1861

Services
| Preceding station | DB Fernverkehr | Following station |
|---|---|---|
| Lennestadt-Altenhundem towards Dortmund Hbf or Münster Hbf | IC 34 | Siegen-Weidenau towards Frankfurt (Main) Hbf |
| Preceding station | DB Regio NRW | Following station |
| Welschen Ennest towards Dortmund Hbf | RE 34 | Siegen-Weidenau towards Siegen Hbf |
| Eichen towards Hagen Hbf | RB 91 | Siegen-Geisweid towards Siegen Hbf |
| Preceding station | Hessische Landesbahn | Following station |
| Ferndorf (Siegen) towards Betzdorf (Sieg) | RB 93 | Siegen-Geisweid towards Bad Berleburg |
Location

Kreuztal station is the main railway station in the town of Kreuztal, North Rhine-Westphalia, Germany.

== History ==
The construction of a rail link to Kreuztal was under discussion in the 1840s. The route most discussed at that time was a line from Cologne via the Agger valley (a route eventually used by the Siegburg–Olpe railway) and continuing east through the Wittgensteiner Land to Treysa along the route of the later Kreuztal–Cölbe railway. In 1861 the Ruhr–Sieg railway was opened between Siegen and Hagen through Kreuztal (then spelt Creuzthal). In 1884 the first section of the Kreuztal–Cölbe railway was opened to Hilchenbach. This led to Kreuztal gradually becoming a transport hub. Although the construction of the only missing section of the original planned east-west line between Olpe and Kreuztal was still planned in 1913, the Prussian Parliament decided not to build it due to the outbreak of World War I.

Between 1860 and 1865 the station was built on a large meadow in Kreuztal, which then had approximately 200 residents. The industrial Ferndorf valley, including the Müsen mining district, was of paramount importance. On 6 August 1861, when the last section of the Ruhr–Sieg line was opened, there was already restaurant facilities in the station building. The main station building was a three-storey building with gables facing Bahnhofstraße (“station street”). On the ground floor it had two waiting rooms with a bar area and two offices, one for the station master and the other for ticketing and baggage handling. Upstairs was accommodation for the station master and the chief signalman. With the opening of the Rothaar branch line to Hilchenbach in 1884 and its continuation to Erndtebrück and Marburg in 1888/89, an extension to the station complex was required. The station building was enlarged with an annex on the south side. This was followed by further renovations and additions.

The first bomb attack on the station Kreuztal occurred towards the end of World War II, on 22 February 1945, and mostly destroyed the track work in the passenger station. In another attack on 18 March 1945, the shunting yard was almost completely destroyed. In 1947 the destroyed part of the facade of the reception building was replaced by a rectangular building with a hipped roof and strongly articulated.

After a fire in 2002, when large parts of the building were burned completely, the reception building was no longer usable. At the end of 2004 the city of Kreuztal acquired the station for the symbolic price of one euro. After extensive construction work costing a total of €2.1 million, of which about a quarter was contributed by North Rhine-Westphalia, the station re-opened in February 2008 as the Kulturbahnhof (“culture station”) Kreuztal.

Today the station has three platform tracks, all accessible by lifts. Public toilets are accessible from the platforms. The lobby, with its art exhibition space and the kiosk on the ground floor, is also accessible by wheelchair. The lobby is equipped with an induction audio system, enabling deaf people to participate in cultural events. The announcements of Deutsche Bahn on the platform and in the lobby are connected with the audio system.

== Regional transport ==
Kreuztal station is served by buses to many destinations, including Freudenberg, Hilchenbach, Junkernhees, Littfeld and Siegen. In the 2026 timetable, the following regional services stop at the station:

| Line | Route | Frequency |
|---|---|---|
| IC 34 | (Münster – Hamm –) Dortmund – Kreuztal – Siegen – Siegen – Dillenburg – Wetzlar – Bad Nauheim – Frankfurt / Friedberg (Hess) | 5 train pairs |
| RE 34; Dortmund–Siegerland-Express | (Dortmund – Witten – Hagen –) Iserlohn-Letmathe – Finnentrop – Kreuztal – Siegen | 60 or 120 min (60 mins for IC 34 and RE 34 together) |
| RB 91; Ruhr-Sieg-bahn | Hagen – Iserlohn-Letmathe – (Finnentrop – Kreuztal – Siegen) / Iserlohn | 60 min (120 min on Sundays and public holidays) |
| RB 93; Rothaarbahn | Siegen – Kreuztal – Hilchenbach – Erndtebrück – Bad Berleburg | 60 min (120 min on Sundays and public holidays) |

Kreuztal station is located in the area of the fare association Westfalen-Tarif

== Culture station ==
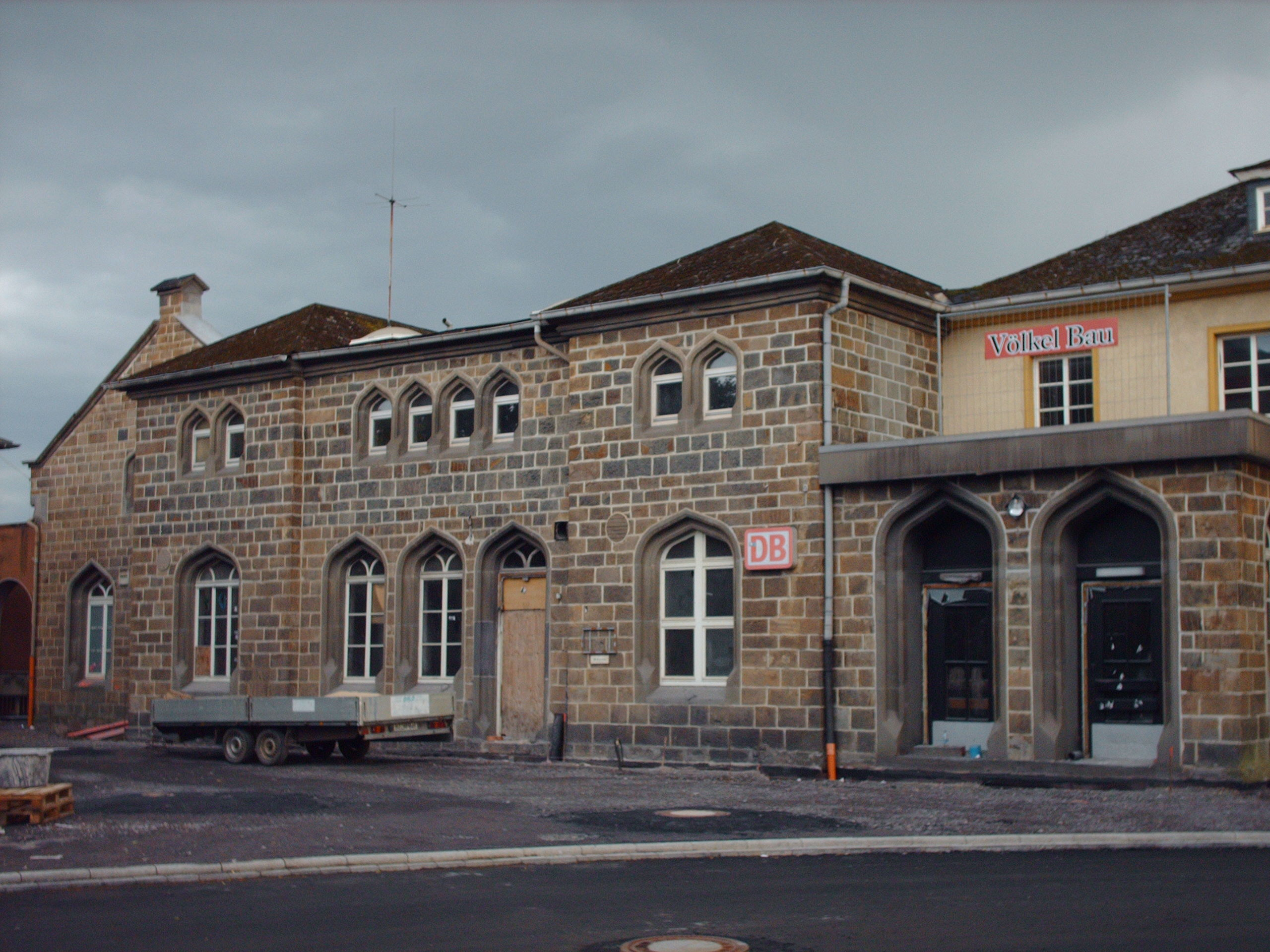
Entrance building during the reconstruction in July 2007

During the renovation of the station building in 2007-08, it was rebuilt as a Kulturbahnhof ("culture station”) with offices, shops, a dining area and two art studios. Two well-known artists from the region, Annette Besgen and Ulrich Langenbach, have their studios there with an area of 100 square metres. In a small gallery in the foyer with a total area of 40 square metres of exhibition space, three to four exhibitions from all areas of fine art are held each year under the motto "scene change" (szenenwechsel).
