= Rothaarsteig =

Hiking trail in Germany

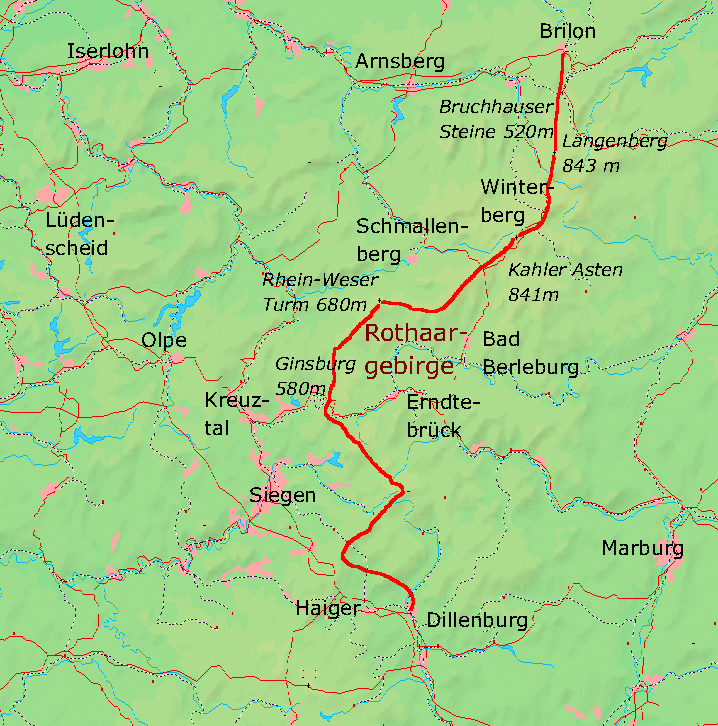
Map of the Rothaarsteig

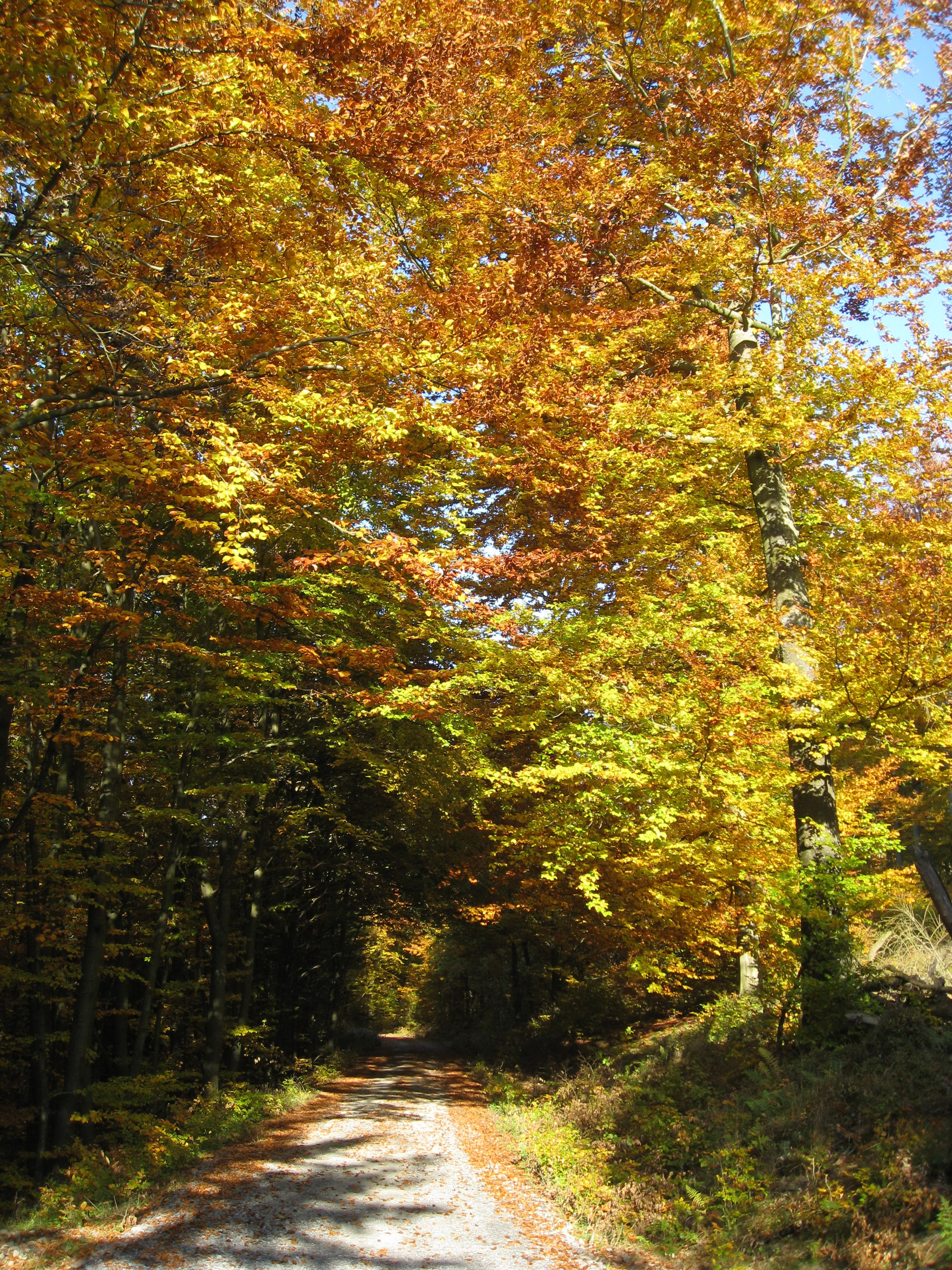
Rothaarsteig near Bad Berleburg

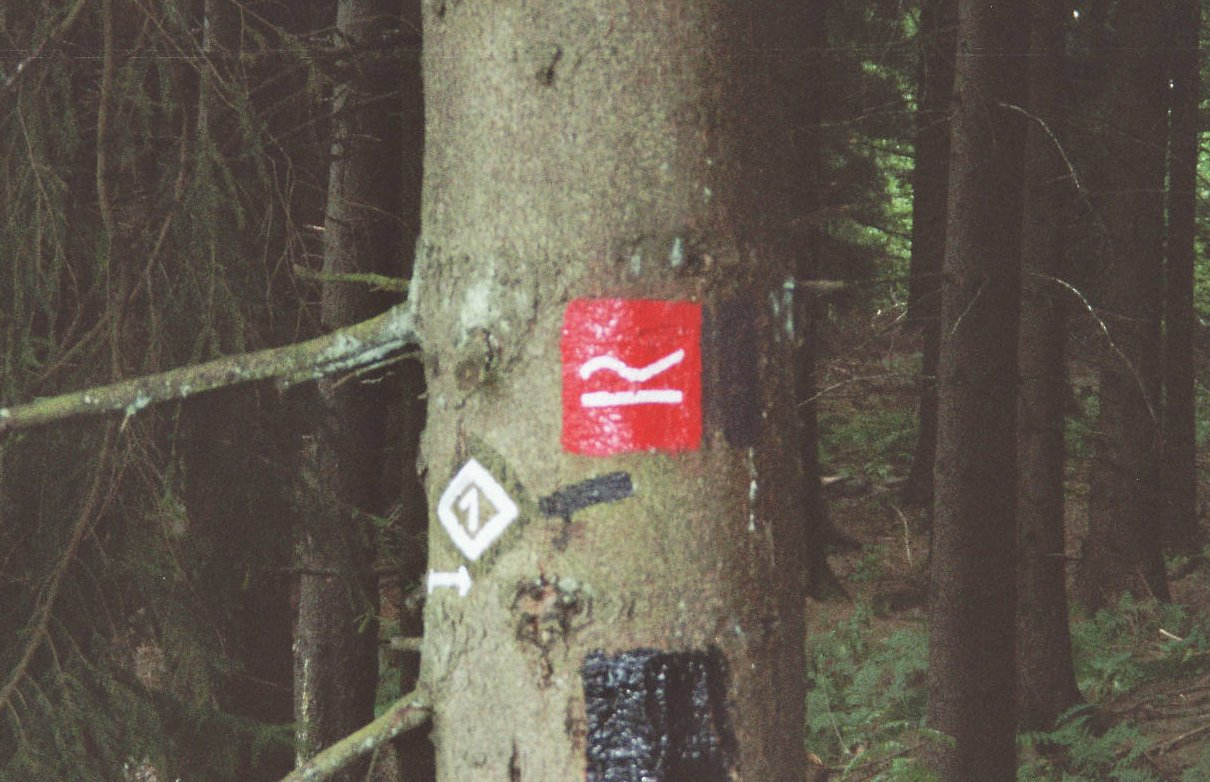
Signpost for the Rothaarsteig: a white "R" on its side on a red background

The Rothaarsteig is a 154.80 km long hiking trail along the crest of the Rothaargebirge mountain range in Germany in the border region between the states of North Rhine-Westphalia (NW) and Hesse (HE). It was opened in 2001.

== Overview ==
The main route of the Rothaarsteig trail runs from Brilon (NW), mainly in a southerly direction over the Kahler Asten (NW) to Dillenburg (HE).

Most of the Rothaarsteig is located in the Rothaargebirge Nature Park. It runs mainly along the watershed between the rivers Rhine and Weser over the heavily forested mountains of the Rothaargebirge and through its valleys and uses the existing network of metalled and unmetalled forest tracks. In an extremely sparsely populated region it links hills and places of interest such as the Bruchhauser Steine, the Langenberg, the Kahler Asten, the Rhine-Weser Tower, the Ginsburg and several sources of major rivers like the Ruhr, Eder, Sieg and Lahn. Between Schmallenberg and Bad Berleburg the Rothaarsteig meets the Waldskulpturenweg.

Despite its route inside a range of high hills, the Rothaarsteig generally easy to walk. It passes several towns including Winterberg, through which it runs.

== Marking ==
The signpost symbol for the Rothaarsteig is a white "R" on its side on a red background. The paths leading to the trail from the valleys along the way have the same sign but in black on a yellow background.

== Route ==
=== Main trail ===
The 154.80 kilometre long main trail of the Rothaarsteig runs over mountains, past springs and natural and cultural monuments and through nature reserves. These include, from north to south (with heights above Normalnull; NN):

The Rothaarsteig starts at Brilon (450 m) and runs southwards past the source of the Möhne (500 m) to the Borbergskirchof (629 m; at Borberg, 669 m), over the Ginsterkopf (663 m) and past the Bruchhauser Steinen (up to 756 m) to the Richtplatz (old Thing site for the Electorate of Cologne; 762.6 m; near the Hoppernkopf, 805 m). The walking trail then runs over the Langenberg (843.2 m), the highest point in North Rhine-Westphalia, and through the Neuer Hagen nature reserve, whereby it runs past the source of the Hoppecke (785 m) up the Clemensberg (839.2 m) and past the Hillekopf (804.9 m) to the northeast.

The route then continues on to the Küstelberg (666.1 m; which is the source of the river Orke) to the Wagenschmier quarry (645 m), then past the source of the Ruhr (666.5 m) on the Ruhrkopf (695.7 m) and on in a southwesterly direction to Winterberg (670 m), where it passes the southern portal of the Herrloh Tunnel at Herrloh (732,9 m), 200 m southeast of the St.-Georg-Schanze. The path then runs past the mountains of Poppenberg (745.5 m) and Bremberg (809 m) to the Kahler Asten (841.9 m), on which the Asten Tower (an observation tower) and e. g. the source of the river Lenne may be found (819 m).

From the Lenne spring the Rothaarsteig runs by the high villages of Lenneplätze, Neuastenberg, Langewiese and Hoheleye to Albrechtsplatz (728.6 m) and past the source of the Friede (740 m; a tributary of the Odeborn) to the Heidenstock (752.2 m). About 500 m southwest of the Heidenstock the Rothaarsteig divides into separate hill and valley courses:

The Bergweg ("mountain path"), which is part of the main Rothaarsteig trail, crosses a section of the Waldskulpturenweg, which combines with it in places. Initially it runs in a southerly direction past the hamlet of Kühhude (697.2 m; a northern suburb of Bad Berleburg) and the Saukopf (715.5 m) to the suspension bridge near the source of the Hochgelmke Siepen (680,5 m; in the catchment area of the Lenne tributary, the Latrop). Then the Bergweg runs westwards over the Großer Kopf (740.3 m) to the Millionenbank (632.4 m), where it rejoins the Talweg or valley path.

The Talweg (13.7 km long), also called the Hochsauerlandvariante ("High Sauerland Variant"), is the most important branch of the Rothaarsteig. It runs initially westwards past a war cemetery (Soldatengrab, 711.7 m) and the cultural monument of the Wegsperre (715.9 m) to the village of Schanze (700 m; east-southeastern suburb of Schmallenberg). It then runs in a more or less southeastern direction and then west again in the Grubental valley along the Grubensiepen (tributary of the Latrop) and its tributary, the Schladebach, past the Altarstein (heathen sacrifice site; 536.2 m) and the natural monument known as the Dicke Eiche ("Fat Oak", 482.7 m) to the village of Latrop in the Latrop valley (430 m; southeastern municipality of Schmallenberg). Thereafter the Talweg runs south around the neighbouring mountains of Große- (610.2 m) and Kleine Bamicke (659.8 m) to the Millionenbank (632.4 m), where it meets the Bergweg.

From the Millionenbank the main Rothaarsteig path continues westwards via Jagdhaus (650 m; southern municipality of Schmallenberg), where the Kapellenwäldchen natural monument is found at Heidkopf (665.9 m), to the Trudes Sonnenbank (657.3 m) mountain hut and past the source of the Somborn (680 m; in the Eder catchment area), which is located on the southeastern slopes of the Härdler (755.8 m), to the crosstracks of Potsdamer Platz (678.1 m). The walking path then runs past the refuge hut on the Margaretenstein (685 m) to the Rhine-Weser Tower (680 m; observation tower) on the Westerberg (684.6 m).

From the Rhine-Weser Tower the Rothaarsteig runs in a southerly direction to the source region of the Schwarzbach (right source stream of the Eder tributary, the Röspe). Just under 1 km further southeast it runs past the Panorama-Park Sauerland before following the valley of the Schwarzbach. After crossing that stream the walking trail runs along the Schwarzbach tributary, the Habecker Bach, to its origin and then continues to the mountain hut (621.1 m) at Rastplatz Hochheide. Continuing through the nature reserve of Haberg (625.4 m; Heinsberger Hochheide) it runs over the 637.9 m high crest of the closed Heinsberg Tunnel (1,303 m long) and then heads south to the Dreiherrnstein (673.9 m), which is a northeastern subpeak of the Riemen (677.7 m).

The Rothaarsteig runs past the summit of the Riemen about 150 m to the east to the valley of the Elberndorfer Bach (a western Eder tributary), which it crosses in a westerly direction. Next it runs a few metres east of the Ferndorf spring (600 m), and passes, further south, the cultural monuments of Schrammer Heide and Schanze and runs in a southwesterly direction − over the Schloßberg Tunnel (270 m long) of the Rothaar Railway− to the ruins of Ginsburg (587.,6 m).

Thereafter the Rothaarsteig runs eastwards over the Giller (653.5 m; with its Giller Tower) to Lützel (575.1 m) southeast of Hilchenbach. Next the trail runs along the Eder to its source (620 m) and over the old coal road (Kohlenstraße, maximum height 640 m) to Waldheim in Benfe, south of Erndtebrück, where it crosses the Eder tributary, the Benfe (568 m). Bordering the eastern edge of the village of Großenbach, west of Bad Laasphe, where the Rothaarsteig swings towards the southwest for a few hundred metres, it runs to the source of the Rhine tributary, the Sieg (603 m), where it crosses part of the Eisenstraße.

After that the Rothaarsteig runs in a southerly direction parallel to and, in places, along the Eisenstraße to the source of the Ilm (622 m; tributary of the Lahn) and then past the origin of the Lahn (605 m) itself in Lahnhof (a village near Nenkersdorf which is in turn part of the borough of Netphen) eastwards to the Ilsesource (620 m). It then runs over the Jagdberg (675.9 m), along a section of the border with the neighbouring state of Hesse and past the Kaffeebuche natural monument (590 m) to the source of the Dill (560 m) which lies in Hesse on the Haincher Höhe (606 m). Passing over the Tiefenrother Höhe (551 m) near Wilgersdorf on the state border and then the eastern subpeak of the Kalteiche (579,3 m), where the trail bends southeast to the Lucaseiche natural monument (440 m), the Rothaarsteig finally reaches Hesse. Through Rodenbach (310 m), north of Haiger, it continues to Manderbach (305 m), north of Dillenburg, and over the Dillenburg Galgenberg (302 m), running past the Wilhelm Tower (260 m) before finally ending in Dillenburg (233 m).

== Towns and villages ==
The Rothaarsteig runs through or past the following towns and villages (in alphabetical order):

- Bad Berleburg
- Bad Laasphe
- Breitscheid
- Brilon
- Burbach
- Dillenburg
- Dietzhölztal
- Erndtebrück
- Haiger
- Hilchenbach
- Kirchhundem
- Küstelberg
- Netphen
- Olsberg
- Schmallenberg
- Willingen
- Wilnsdorf
- Winterberg

== Cycling the trail ==
The use of the Rothaarsteig by bicycle is problematic but possible. The gradients reach 15 % in many places. In addition there are stretches that have been damaged or turned to mud by forestry vehicles. Bicycles therefore need to be cross-country capable and the fitness of the cyclist sufficient for the challenge. Difficult sections of the path may sometimes be bypassed on parallel running country roads.

== Rothaarsteig Marathon ==
Every October the Rothaarsteig Marathon starts in Fleckenberg and involves runners climbing a height difference of 838 metres. The first marathon took place in 2003. In addition to the full marathon distance, a half-marathon is also run.

== Transport to the area ==
The Rothaarsteig is more or less accessible on public transport. The bus and railway lines that run parallel to it or cross it have at least hourly services. The following places have a railway station or are part of a good bus network, but in some cases are several kilometres from the Rothaarsteig:

- Brilon on the Upper Ruhr Valley Railway
- Willingen on the Upland Railway (Kurhessen Railway) from Brilon to Korbach
- Winterberg on the Bestwig and Winterberg railway
- Schmallenberg on bus routes S40 and 367
- Altenhundem, Haiger and Dillenburg on the Ruhr-Sieg Railway
- Bad Berleburg and Hilchenbach on the Rothaar Railway
- Erndtebrück on the Upper Lahn Valley Railway and Rothaar Railway
- Lützel (part of Hilchenbach) on the Rothaar Railway
- Feudingen on the Upper Lahn Valley Railway via Bad Laasphe to Marburg
