= Erndtebrück station =

Railway station in Germany

Erndtebrück
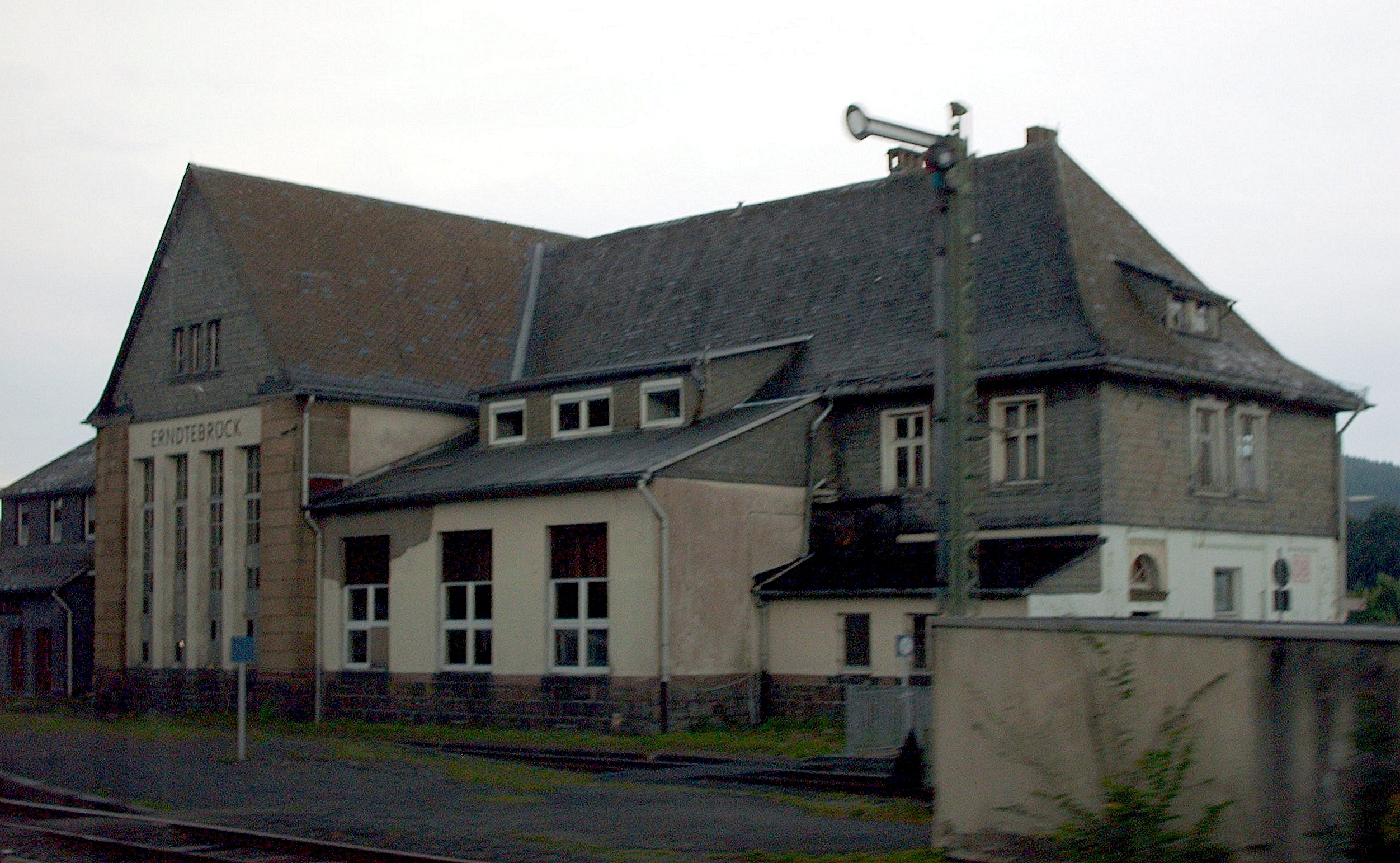
- 2007

General information
- Location: Bahnhofstraße 9; 57339 Erndtebrück; North Rhine-Westphalia; Germany
- Coordinates: 50.9908°N 8.2554°E
- Elevation: 481 m (1,578 ft)
- System: Bf
- Owner: Deutsche Bahn
- Operator: DB Station&Service
- Lines: Erndtebrück–Bad Berleburg railway (KBS 443); Kreuztal–Cölbe railway (KBS 623)
- Platforms: 2 island platforms
- Tracks: 4
- Train operators: Hessische Landesbahn; Kurhessenbahn
- Connections: RB 93RB 94; A382 L200 L201 L202 R27 R29 R30

Other information
- Station code: 1659
- DS100 code: EEK
- IBNR: 8001851
- Category: 5
- Fare zone: Westfalentarif: 81206
- Website: www.bahnhof.de

History
- Opened: 1888; 138 years ago

Services
Preceding station	Hessische Landesbahn	Following station
Lützel towards Betzdorf (Sieg)	RB 93	Birkelbach towards Bad Berleburg
Preceding station	Kurhessenbahn	Following station
Terminus	RB 94	Schameder towards Marburg (Lahn)
Location
- Location within North Rhine-Westphalia Location within Germany Location within Europe

Erndtebrück station is a railway station in the municipality of Erndtebrück, located in the Siegen-Wittgenstein district in North Rhine-Westphalia, Germany.
