= Kreuztal–Cölbe railway =

German railway

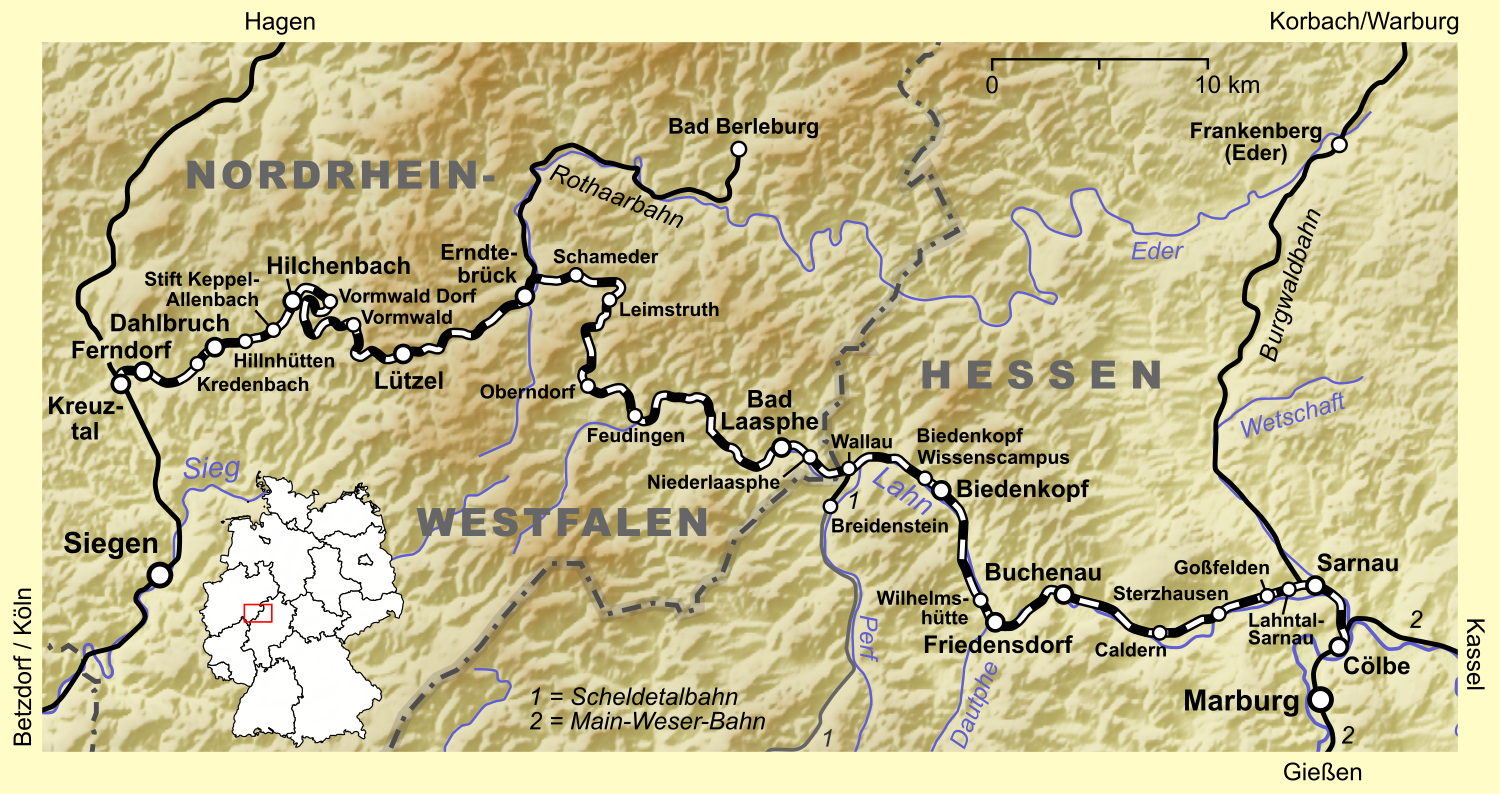

Overview
- Line number: 2870
- Locale: Hesse and North Rhine-Westphalia, Germany
- Termini: Kreuztal; Cölbe

Service
- Route number: 443, 623

Technical
- Line length: 88.428 km (54.947 mi)
- Track gauge: 1,435 mm (4 ft 8 1/2 in) standard gauge
- Operating speed: Erndtebrück–Wallau: 60 km/h (37 mph); Wallau–Cölbe: 80 km/h (50 mph)

The Kreuztal–Cölbe railway is a 88-kilometre-long main line in Hesse and North Rhine-Westphalia, Germany. It branches off the Ruhr–Sieg railway at Kreuztal and runs via Erndtebrück, Bad Laasphe and Biedenkopf to Cölbe. Operationally, the line is now divided into two parts. The Kreuztal–Erndtebrück section is operated together with the Erndtebrück–Bad Berleburg railway as the Rothaar-Bahn (Rothaar Railway) and the subsequent section to Cölbe, now operated by the Kurhessenbahn, is called the Obere Lahntalbahn (Upper Lahn Valley Railway). Trains at the eastern end of the line run to/from Marburg (Lahn).

== History ==
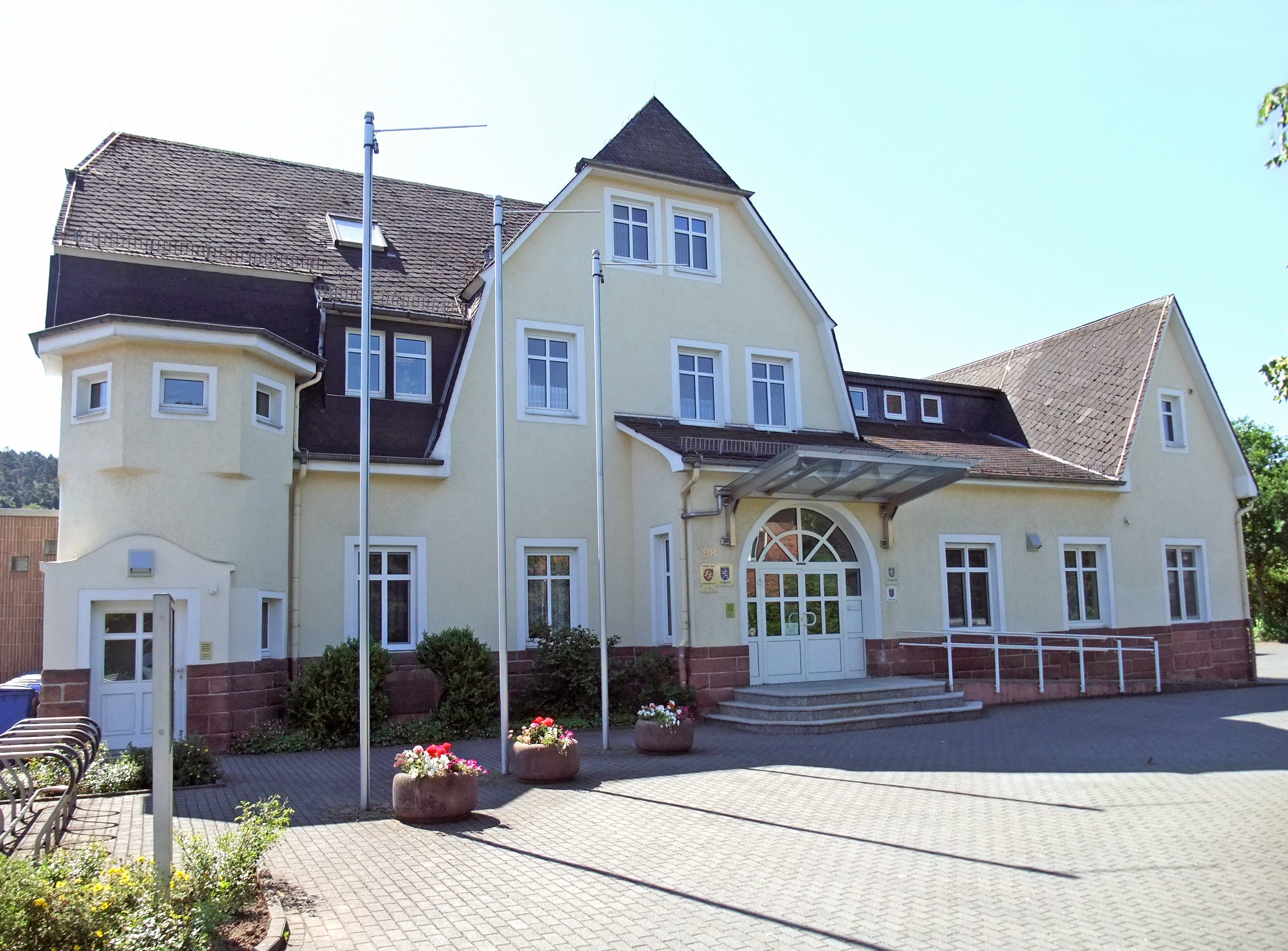
Entrance building of Cölbe station

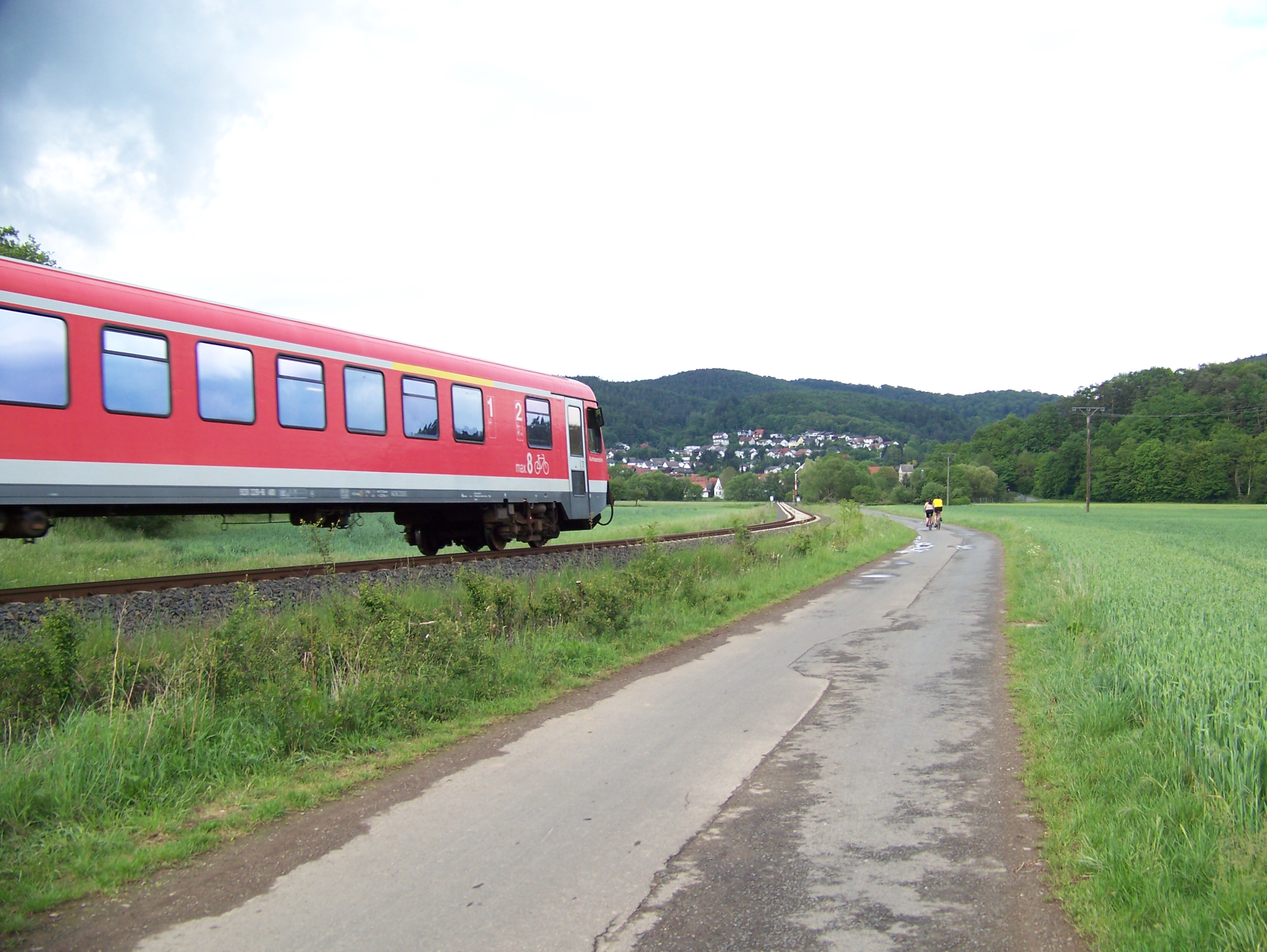
Class 628 railcar running towards Marburg

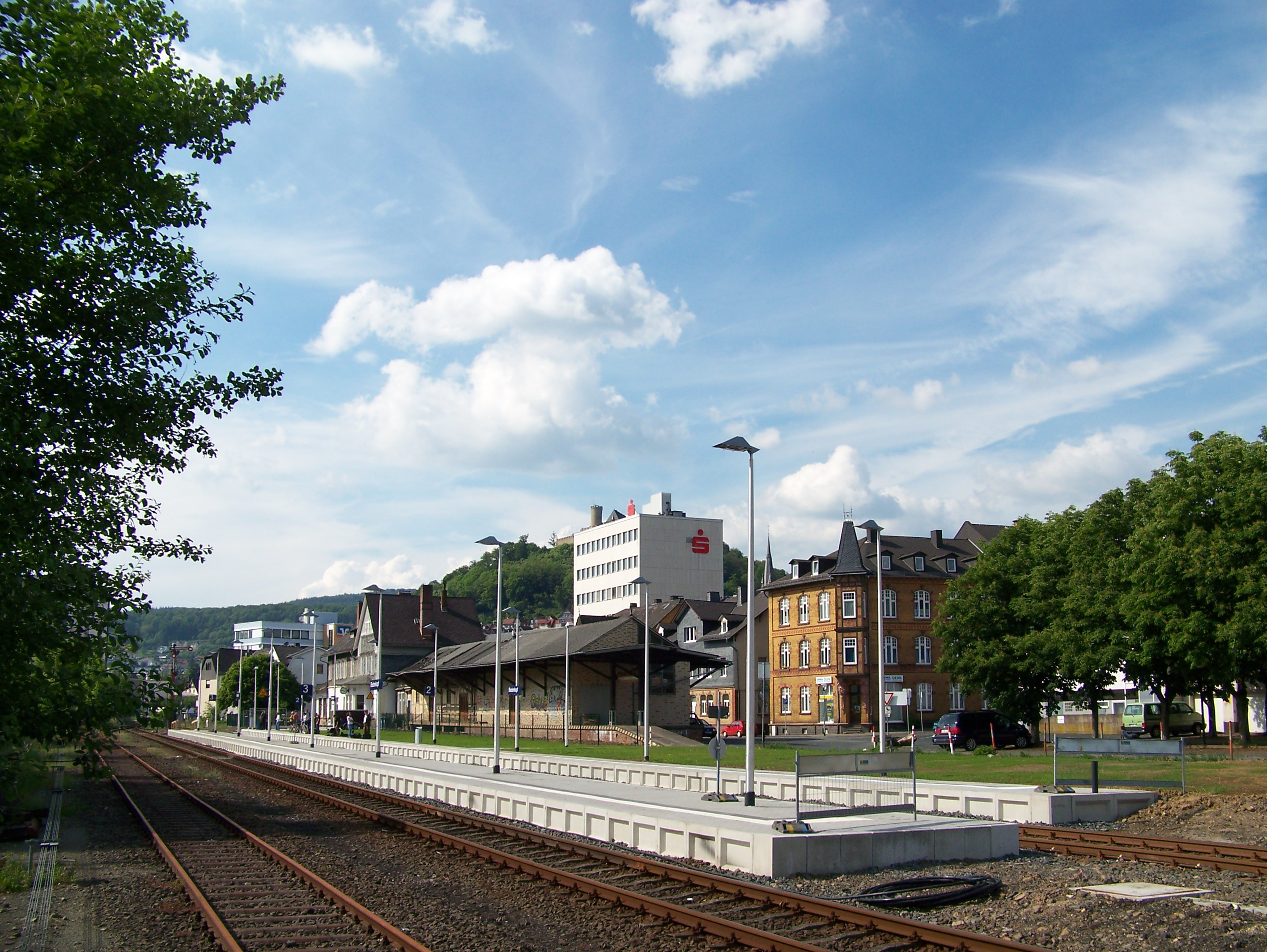
Biedenkopf station (2007)

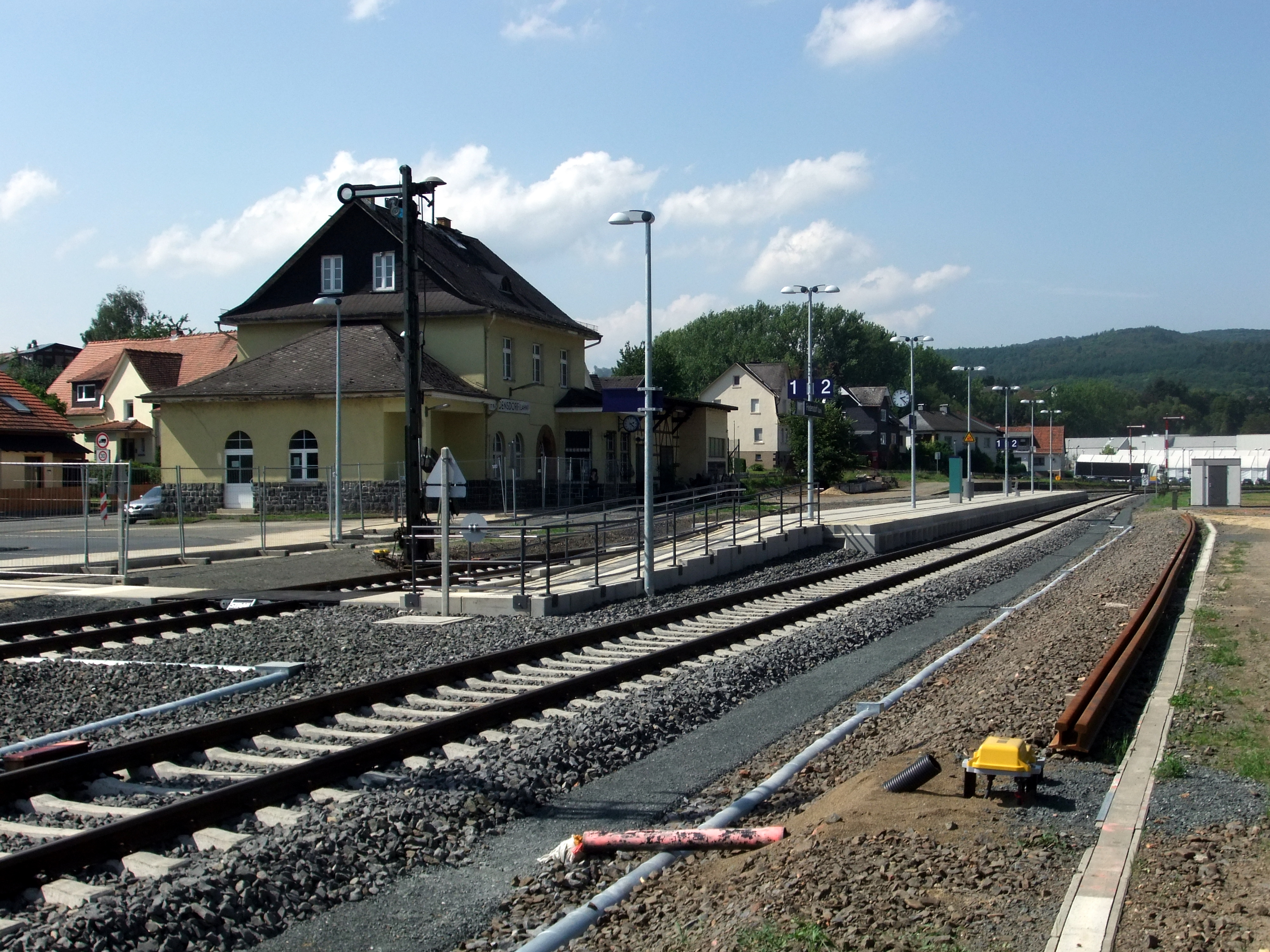
Friedensdorf (Lahn) station

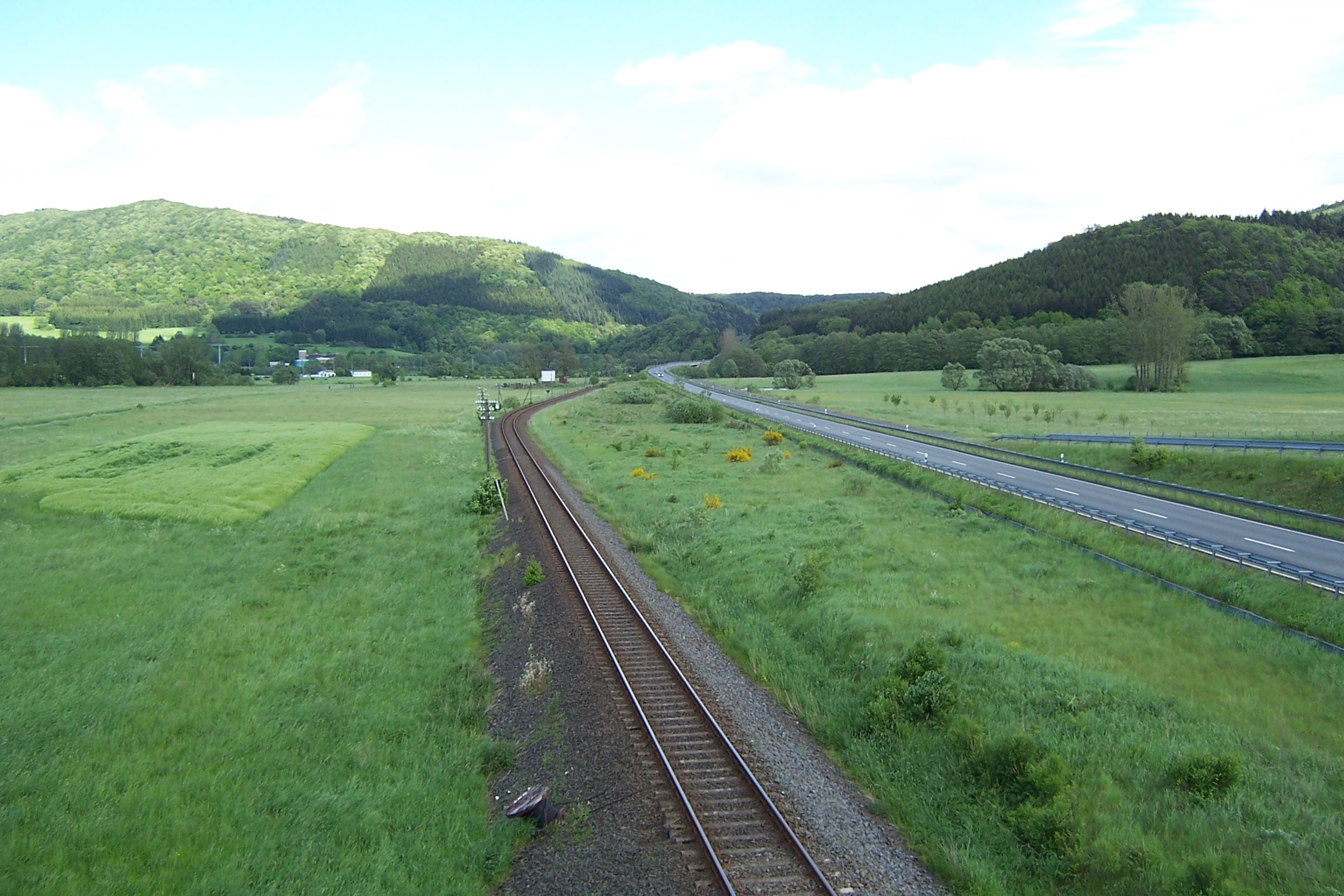
Line near Wallau (Lahn)

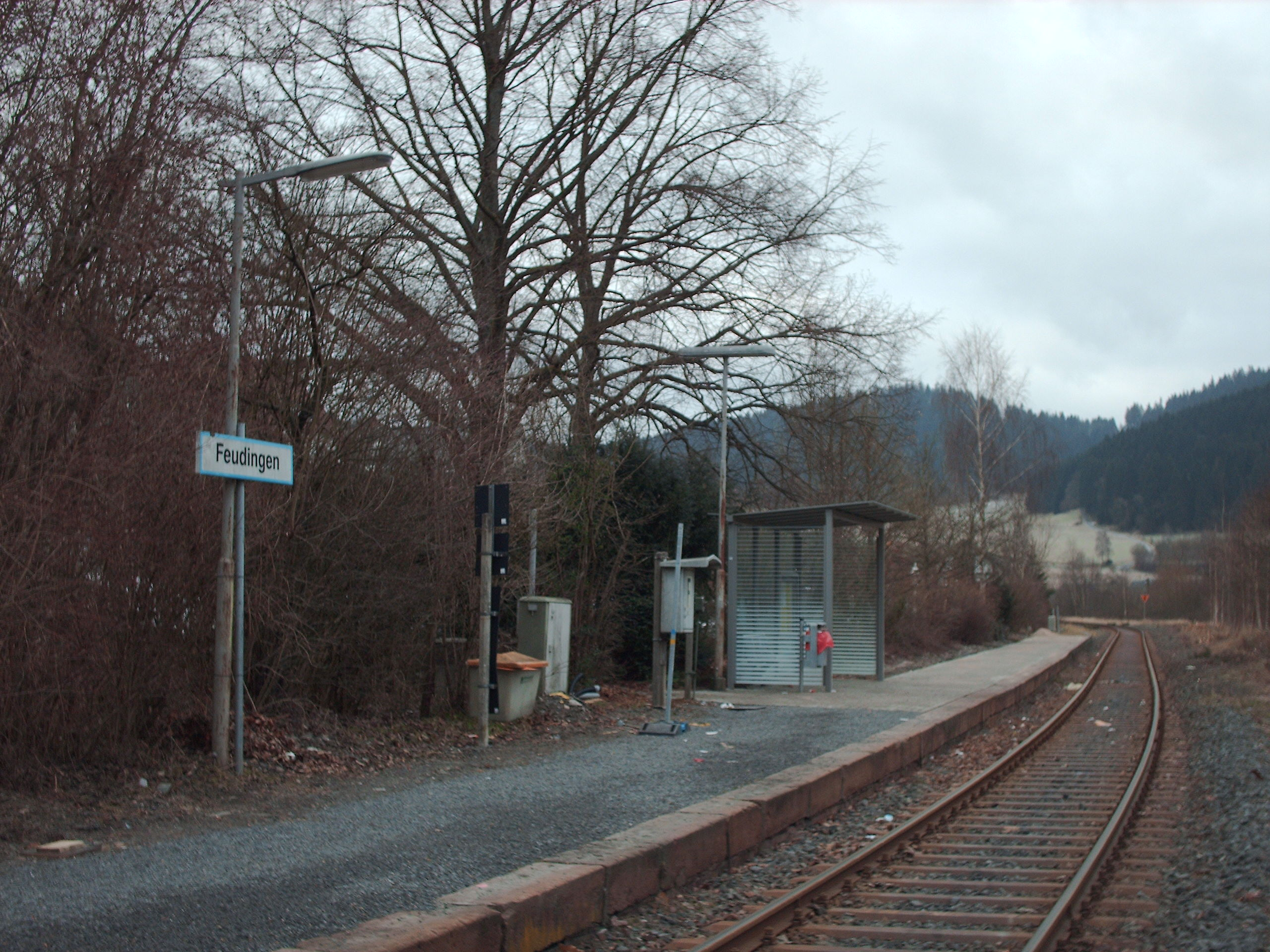
Feudingen station (2008)

The need for a rail connection between the (upper) Lahn valley and the Ruhr was first identified by Splingard, chief engineer of the then Electorate of Hesse, in 1847. His intention was to build a main line from Cologne to Marburg, in order to enable a direct east–west connection on the Breslau–Dresden–Leipzig–Halle–Kassel–Marburg–Cologne–Ostend route, connecting by steamship to London. The cost of the entire line from Marburg to Cologne via Biedenkopf and Siegen, including branch lines to coal mines, was estimated at around 28 million guilders, but only slightly less than 900,000 guilders had to be raised for the section between Kreuztal and Cölbe, since there was little requirement for expensive tunnels, embankments and other structures. The planning phase was interrupted by the effects of the German revolution of 1848. Later memoranda and publications repeatedly mentioned an Oberlahn-Eisenbahn (Upper Lahn Railway), Lenne-Lahn-Bahn durch das Oberlahnthal (Lenne-Lahn Railway through the Upper Lahn Valley) or Ruhr-Lenne-(Sieg-)Oberlahn-Eisenbahn (Ruhr-Lenne-(Sieg-) Upper Lahn Railway) between Siegen and Marburg in Rede, which gave the Oberen Lahntalbahn (Upper Lahn Valley Railway) its name. It was not until 1863 that the treaty was contracted between Hesse, Prussia and Electorate Hesse to allow the building of a connection.

Since the plans for this main line were not carried out, it was decided to build a line between Kreuztal and Marburg to serve the impoverished districts of Wittgenstein (now part of Siegen-Wittgenstein) and Biedenkopf (now part of Marburg-Biedenkopf). In particular, it would supply the numerous hammer mills, smelters and foundries along the line and in the hinterland with coal and coke from the Ruhr area for the blast furnaces and cupola furnaces (wood for charcoal having become scarce) and enable iron and steel products to be transported back to the Ruhr at competitive prices.

The first section from Laasphe to Cölbe was opened for freight traffic on 19 March 1883, and passenger traffic began on 2 April of the same year. The line was thus one of the first branch lines in Prussia. An extension to Kreuztal, making a continuous connection from Marburg to Siegen, was planned from the beginning.

The Kreuztal–Hilchenbach section was opened in March 1884, followed by the Feudingen–Laasphe section on 1 July 1888. The Hilchenbach–Erndtebrück section was also put into operation on 1 October 1888. The line was opened for through traffic once the Erndtebrück–Leimstruth section had opened to traffic on 20 December 1888 and the Leimstruth–Feudingen section had opened on 1 October 1889.

After the completion of the through line, traffic initially developed extremely well. In the 1930s, long-distance services also ran on the Kreuztal–Cölbe line (KBS No. 174n). From the 1950s, a pair of express trains ran between Frankfurt and Cologne via Biedenkopf and Siegen. Its discontinuation in 1979 was accompanied by a sharp decline in passenger traffic. In the 1980s the timetable included services almost every hour on weekdays. The trains, made up of two Silberling coaches and a class 211 locomotive, were virtually only used for trips to and from work and school. Freight traffic also declined sharply in the 1970s. It was completely discontinued in the mid-1990s.

In 1994, the rail buses and locomotive-hauled trains of coaches between Siegen and Bad Berleburg were replaced by class 628 multiple units. At the same time, the range of services was expanded and a regular-interval timetable with standardised routes was introduced. The local line, which was advertised as the "Rothaar-Express" when it was launched, has run hourly between Bad Berleburg and Siegen since then. The Erndtebrück–Marburg line was also equipped with railcars and connections were synchronised. At the turn of the millennium, Alstom Coradia LINT (class 640) multiple units were operated as the RB 93 service, which were retained even after the DreiLänderBahn won the contract for operations.

After the Kurhessenbahn took over passenger operations in 2002, the previously declining passenger numbers have risen. In recent years, the Kurhessenbahn has paved the platforms at all stations (except Wallau) between Marburg and Bad Laasphe and raised them to a height of 38 or 55 centimetres. Furthermore, new stations were opened at Biedenkopf Schulzentrum (2003, renamed Biedenkopf Campus in 2018), Niederlaasphe (2009) and Lahntal-Sarnau (2010).

The modernisation of the Erndtebrück junction was completed in 2017. The modernisation included the track infrastructure, the upgrade of the platforms to allow barrier-free movement and the construction of an electronic interlocking. Deutsche Bahn, the federal government and the state of North Rhine-Westphalia invested a total of €13.8 million in the modernisation.

=== The Hinterland Railway ===
There were Hessian and Prussian plans to build a connection between the south and the north of the Hessian hinterland from 1866, but nothing happened for a long time. In 1912, a memorandum was drawn up on the importance of a "hinterland railway" (Hinterlandbahn). The first section would run from Wetzlar to Weidenhausen and then connect with the Aar-Salzböde Railway (Aar-Salzböde-Bahn) at Gladenbach. The next section was supposed to run from Gladenbach to Friedensdorf to connect the Aar-Salzböde Railway with the Upper Lahn Valley Railway, reaching the section running from Biedenkopf into the Eder valley. The importance for the development of the district of Biedenkopf was highlighted and further preparations were made. The plan was abandoned when the First World War broke out.

== Route ==
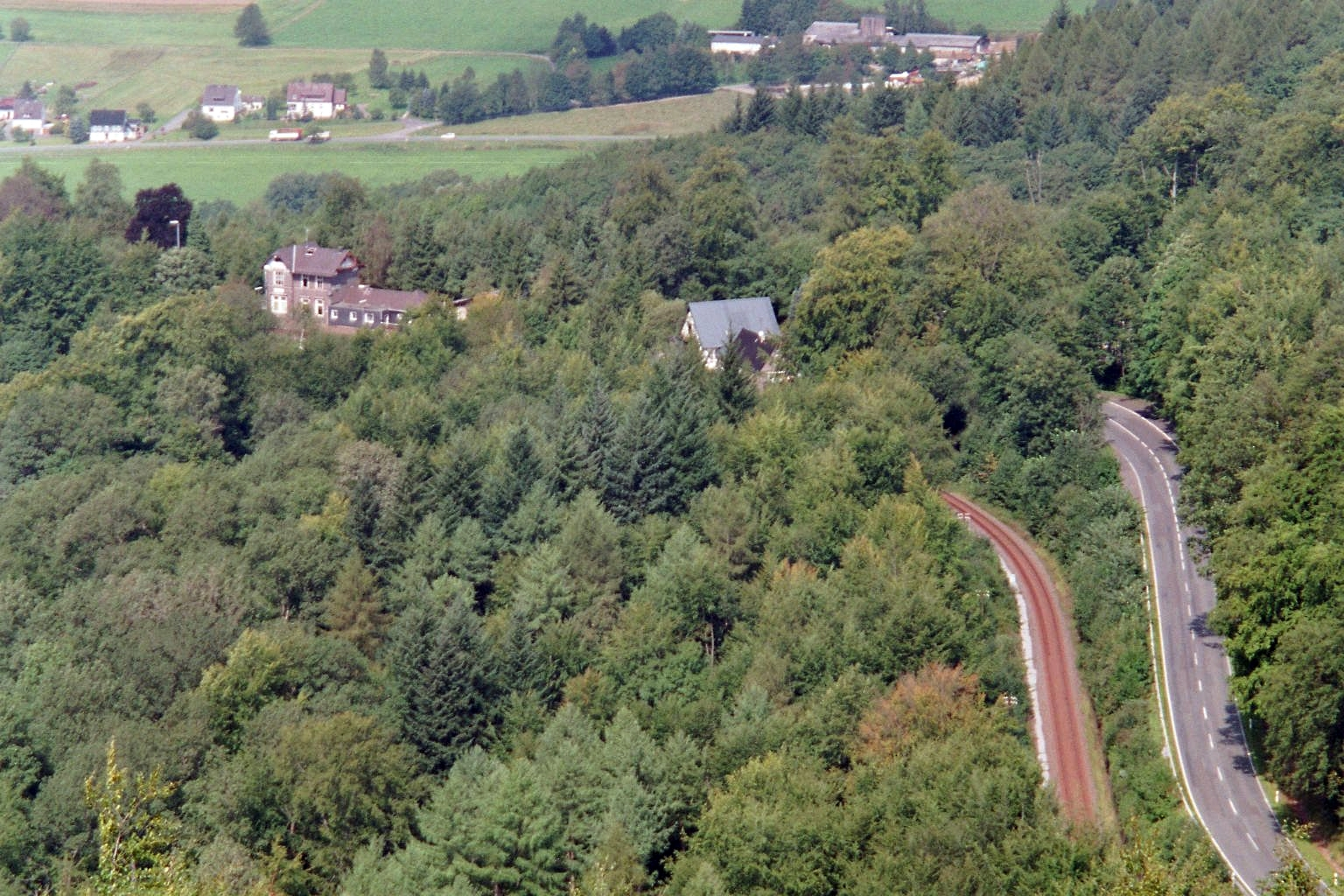
The Rothaar Railway from Ginsburg, looking towards the upper hairpin curve and Vormwald station

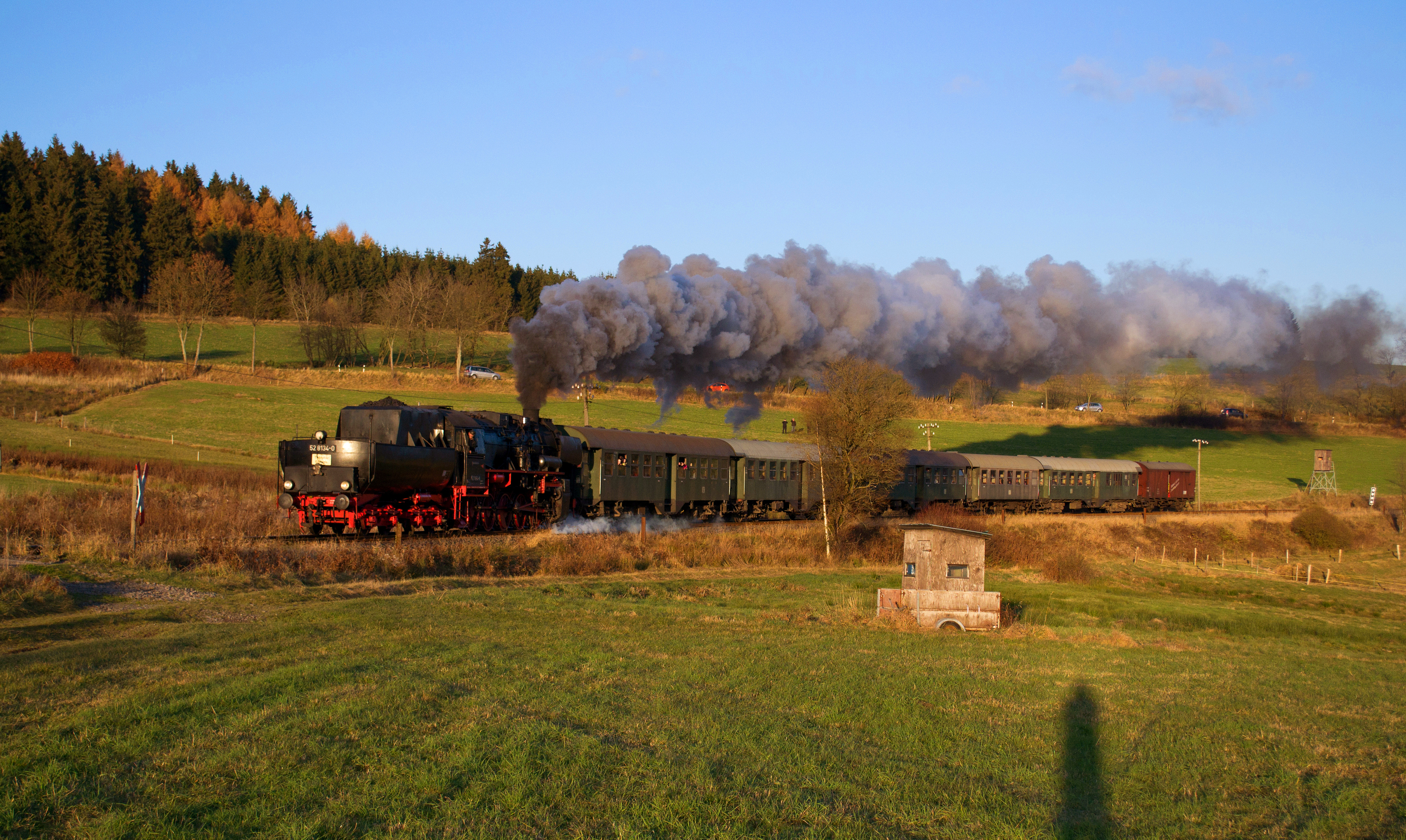
Steam locomotive 52 8134 with an excursion service in Hilchenbach-Lützel

The single-track line runs between Kreuztal and Hilchenbach on the southern slope of the Ferndorf valley and meanders through the Rothaargebirge with two large hairpin curves between Hilchenbach and Erndtebrück in order to gain altitude. The route under the Ginsburg through the Schloßberg tunnel directly next to the Rothaarsteig is particularly picturesque. The high point of the line is directly in front of Lützel station at 555 m above sea level. From there the line follows the Eder valley. The last few kilometres into Erndtebrück run next to federal route 62 (B62). The maximum speed on this section is greatly reduced due to the many unprotected level crossings.

The line crosses the Eder after Erndtebrück, where the line to Bad Berleburg branches off, and then runs south-east. From Feudingen, the railway follows the upper course of the Lahn via Biedenkopf to the east. The line from Korbach joins at Sarnau and, four kilometres later, Cölbe is reached. Trains continue to Marburg.

The B62, which crossed the line twice at level crossings southeast of Saßmannshausen, was relocated in 2015 to bypass these level crossings. In order to enable a connection for freight to the south of the line, however, a new level crossing had to be established.

The route from Kreuztal to Cölbe is 88 kilometres long and classified as a branch line, with a maximum speed of 60 km/h between Kreuztal and Wallau and 80 km/h between Wallau and Cölbe.

A computer-based interlocking was opened in Lützel station in December 2014.

=== Structures on the line ===
In addition to many culverts and retaining walls, there are the following larger structures along the route:

==== Bridges ====
Over the Lahn:

- Cölbe – Sarnau
- Caldern – Buchenau
- Wilhelmshütte – Biedenkopf
- Biedenkopf Campus – Wallau
- Bad Laasphe – Feudingen

Over the Eder:

- Schameder – Erndtebrück

==== Tunnels ====
Leimstruth tunnel (321 m): between Oberndorf and Leimstruth.

== Services ==
=== Rothaar-Bahn ===
In Kreuztal-Ferndorf there are still two industrial sidings (to Bender Eisen- und Metallwerke Ferndorf and for galvanised steel from Thyssen Krupp Stahl AG) with considerable freight traffic. In Dahlbruch, three sidings are regularly served by DB Cargo (Eisenbau Krämer, SMS and a scrap dealer). In Erndtebrück-Grünewald, Kreisbahn Siegen-Wittgenstein operates along the remaining siding to the Erndtebrück ironworks. Occasionally, wagons for loading timber are delivered to Erndtebrück station.

The Rothaar-Bahn (RB 93) local service runs on the Rothaar Railway hourly, but only every two hours on Saturday and Sunday night, giving good connections to the Rhein-Sieg-Express (RE 9) and the Westerwald-Sieg-Bahn (RB 90) in Siegen and the Ruhr-Sieg-Bahn (RB 91) in Kreuztal in both directions.

In Erndtebrück there is a connection to the Obere Lahntalbahn (RB 94) to Bad Laasphe and Marburg.

Local rail passenger services are operated by the Dreiländerbahn of the HLB, which uses LINT (class 640 and 648) and class 1648 diesel multiple units for the Rothaar-Bahn for speeds of up to 120 (class 1648: 140) km/h.

=== Obere Lahntalbahn ===
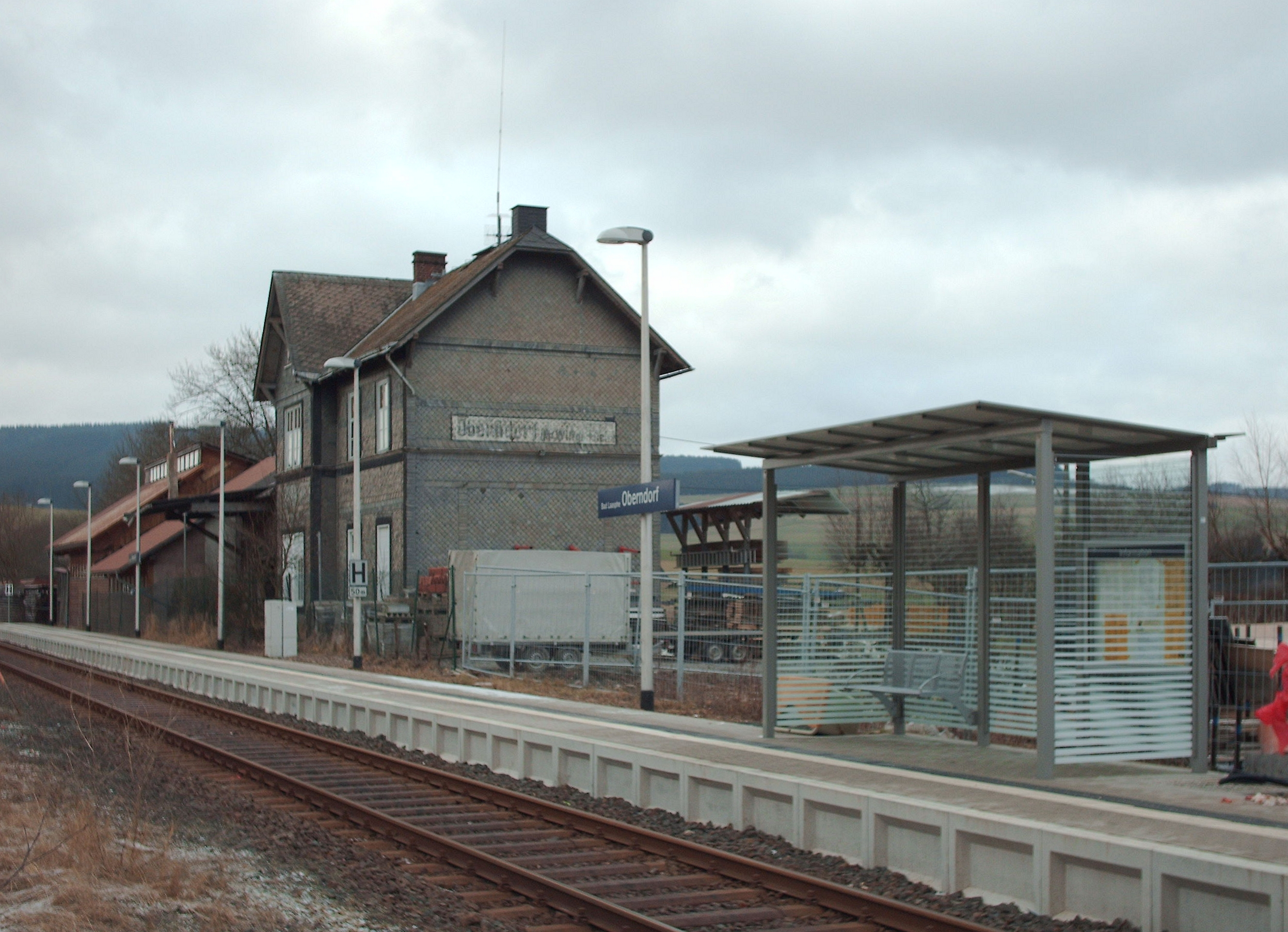
Oberndorf station (2008)

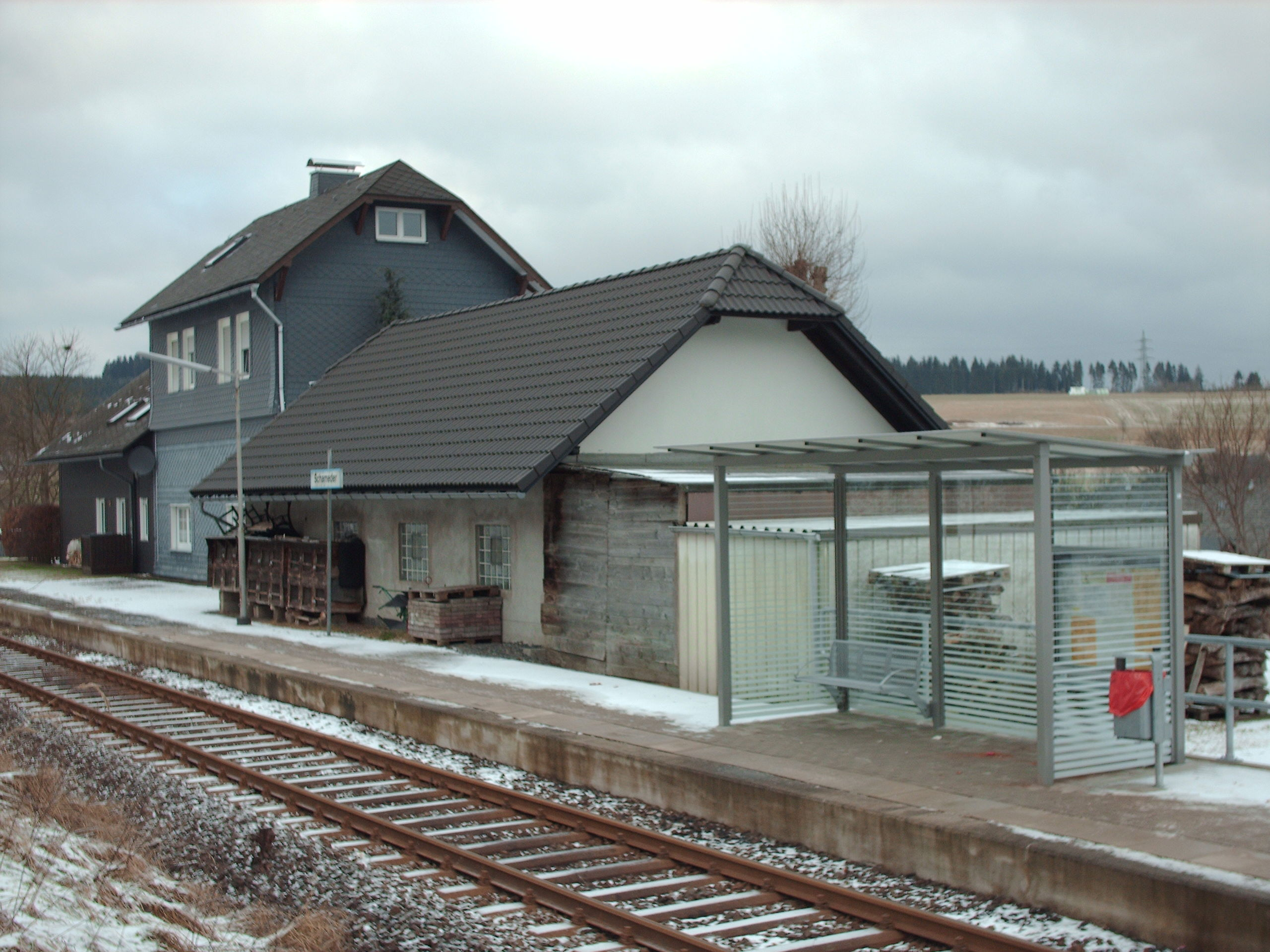
Schameder station

Passenger services on the line are operated by the Kurhessenbahn (timetable line 623), one of the five regional networks of Deutsche Bahn with a total route network of 245 kilometres.

The rail transport is operated by the Kurhessenbahn on behalf of the Rhein-Main-Verkehrsverbund (Rhine-Main Transport Association; Marburg–Wallau) and the Zweckverband Nahverkehr Westfalen-Lippe (Westphalia-Lippe Transport Association; Niederlaasphe–Erndtebrück). Around 3,000 passengers used the line each day in 2010, which corresponds to a passenger increase of 20% since 2007.

The transport services of the "Nordwesthessen" (northwest Hesse) diesel network were awarded to the Kurhessenbahn for a further 15 years with the start of the contract in December 2017. Originally, passenger services were to be re-awarded as early as December 2015, so a two-year bridging contract with the Kurhessenbahn was necessary. This would have allowed for the infrastructure to be fully converted to allow the operation of used and reconditioned low-floor trains. However, this project was delayed. In addition, an hourly service was introduced with the start of operations on the RB 94 on Saturdays between Bad Laasphe and Marburg. Since the 2017/2018 timetable change, the Kurhessenbahn has switched its services to Siemens Desiro Classic (class 642) multiple units, which are gradually being transferred from different regional areas and modernised for the Kurhessenbahn.
