= Hilchenbach =

- Town
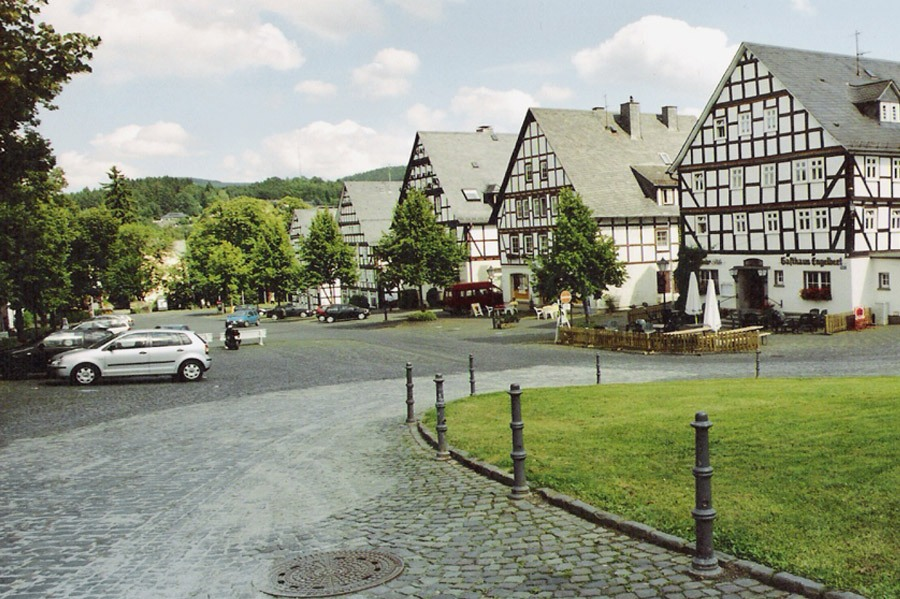

- Coat of arms

- Location of Hilchenbach within Siegen-Wittgenstein district
- Interactive map of Hilchenbach
- Location within Germany Location within North Rhine-Westphalia
- Coordinates: 50°59′54″N 08°06′34″E
- Country: Germany
- State: North Rhine-Westphalia
- Admin. region: Arnsberg
- District: Siegen-Wittgenstein
- Subdivisions: 12

Government
  - Mayor (2020–25): Kyrillos Kaioglidis

Area
  - Total: 81.12 km^{2} (31.32 sq mi)
- Elevation: 360 m (1,180 ft)

Population (2025-12-31)
  - Total: 14,295
  - Density: 176.2/km^{2} (456.4/sq mi)
- Time zone: UTC+01:00 (CET)
  - Summer (DST): UTC+02:00 (CEST)
- Postal codes: 57271
- Dialling codes: 02733
- Vehicle registration: SI
- Website: www.hilchenbach.de

Hilchenbach (German pronunciation: [ˈhɪlçn̩ˌbax]) is a town in the Siegen-Wittgenstein Kreis (district) of North Rhine-Westphalia, Germany.

== Geography ==
=== Location ===
Hilchenbach is about 15 kilometres (9.3 mi) northeast of Siegen. The town borders in the south on Netphen, in the west on Kreuztal, in the north on Kirchhundem and in the east on Erndtebrück.

=== Geology ===
The town's largest flowing body of water is the Ferndorfbach, a tributary to the river Sieg. The municipal area's average elevation is 427 metres (1,401 ft) above sea level, with its highest elevation being at 678 metres (2,224 ft) at the Riemen, a peak in the Rothaargebirge.

=== Constituent communities ===
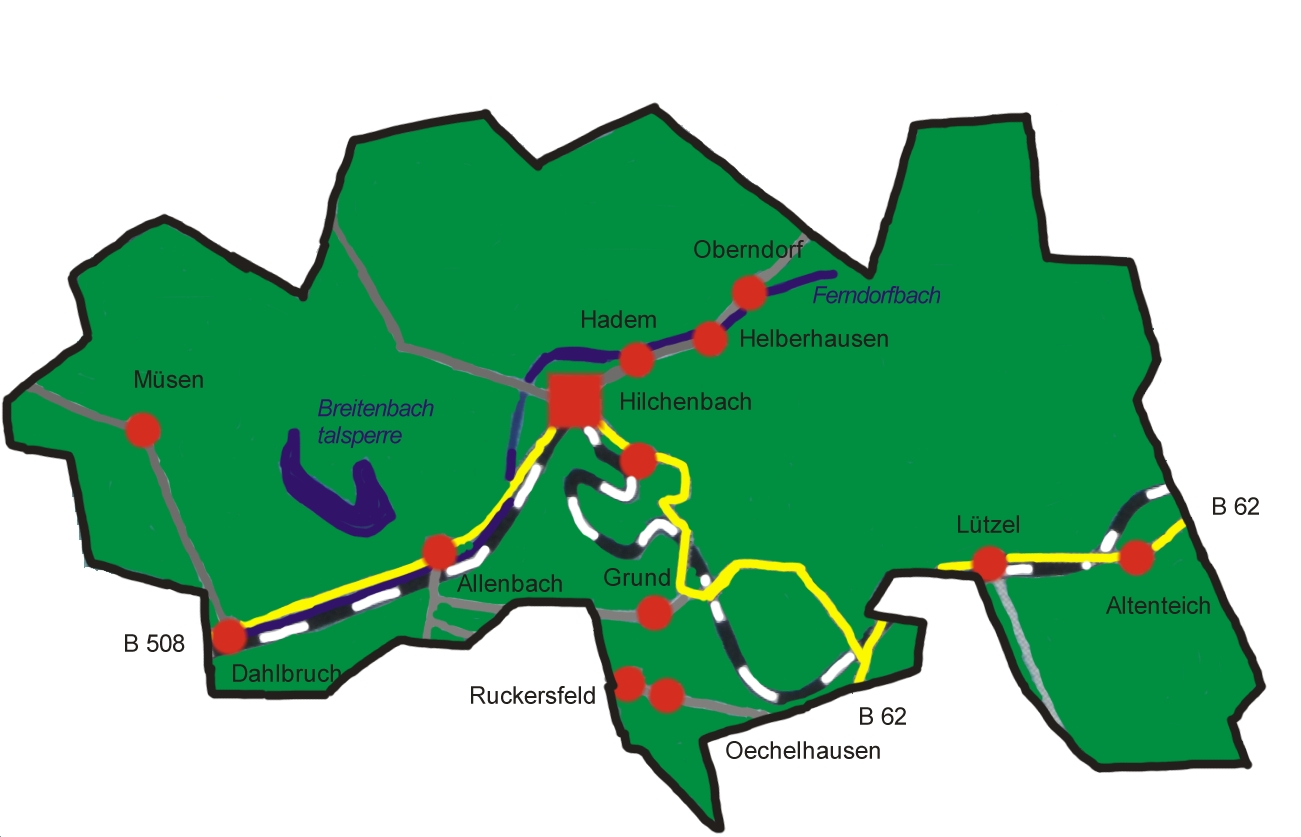
Constituent communities

The town is made up of the following centres: Allenbach, Dahlbruch, Grund, Hadem, Helberhausen, (Alt-)Hilchenbach (alt means "old"), Lützel, Müsen, Oberndorf, Oechelhausen, Ruckersfeld and Vormwald. The recent political unit of Hilchenbach was founded in 1969.

== History ==
The town of Hilchenbach was first mentioned in documents in 1292, when it went by the name Heylichinbach in a donation document from Countess Agnes von Nassau and her eldest son Heinrich to the Keppel Monastery. There are however clues that a church was established in this area sometime between 950 and 1000 by the Corvey Monastery, implying that there was settlement there.

In a document from 20 July 1365, a "firm house" – "festes Haus" – (Wilhelmsburg) in Hilchenbach is mentioned, which from 1489 to 1622 was enfeoffed to the Wischen von Langenau noble family. A castle with a moat was mentioned in 1623. It supposedly replaced Count William of Nassau-Siegen's Ginsburg residence.

In 1687, the village of Hilchenbach was raised to Flecken – market town.

In 1689 and 1844 nearly the whole town of (Alt-)Hilchenbach was destroyed by fire.

Hilchenbach and the villages in the surrounding were a part of the former County of Nassau. During the Napoleonic Wars in 1807 it became part of the Kingdom of Westphalia. In 1815 after the Congress of Vienna Hilchenbach and other villages in the Siegerland became part of the Prussian province of Westphalia.

== Population ==
Historical population

Year	Pop.	±% p.a.
1965	14,372	—
1970	14,814	+0.61%
1975	15,439	+0.83%
1980	15,270	−0.22%
1985	15,067	−0.27%
1990	15,905	+1.09%
1995	16,571	+0.82%

Year	Pop.	±% p.a.
2000	16,630	+0.07%
2005	16,320	−0.38%
2010	15,520	−1.00%
2015	15,169	−0.46%
2020	14,646	−0.70%
2025	14,295	−0.48%

Source: Landesdatabank Nordrhein-Westfalen

== Politics ==
On 2025, the far-right Third Way party won a seat in the North Rhein-Westphalia local elections in the municipality of Hilchenbach.

=== Town council ===
The town council is elected roughly every 5 years. Its composition is listed below:

	SPD	CDU	UWG	Greens	FDP	Left	Third Way	independent	total
2025	10	9	4	2	2	2	1	32	
2020	12	8	5	3	2	1		1	32
2014	15	8	8	5	3	0		1	40
2009	11	8	10	5	4	0		0	38
2004	10	8	11	5	4	0		0	38

Note: UWG (Unabhängige Wählergruppe) is an independent citizens' coalition.

=== Mayor ===
The mayor of Hilchenbach is Kyrillos Kaioglidis, elected in September 2020.

=== Coat of arms ===
Hilchenbach's civic coat of arms might heraldically be described thus: Azure a wolf statant or langued gules; crest: a castle with three crenellated towers argent. The arms were last approved in this form on 13 April 1970. The first version of the coat was approved in 1911 by German emperor Wilhelm II.

The wolf charge refers to the charge in preserved examples of the old Hilchenbach jurymen's seal, which had the circumscription "S. der scheffen von helchenbach" ("S" stood for Siegel – seal – and the rest is archaic German for der Schöffen von Hilchenbach – of the Jurymen of Hilchenbach), and which appears on documents from 6 October 1477 and 17 November 1485.

=== Town partnerships ===
Hilchenbach maintains town friendship links with:

- (Germany) Arendsee, Saxony-Anhalt
- (Germany) Seiffen, Saxony

== Culture and sightseeing ==
=== Theatre ===
In the constituent community of Dahlbruch is found the Viktoriakino, a cinema also used as a theatre.

=== Museums ===
At the mining museum in Müsen, the finds from digs in the Altenberg area are on display. Furthermore, there is a mining gallery for visitors.

=== Buildings ===
==== Ginsburg ====
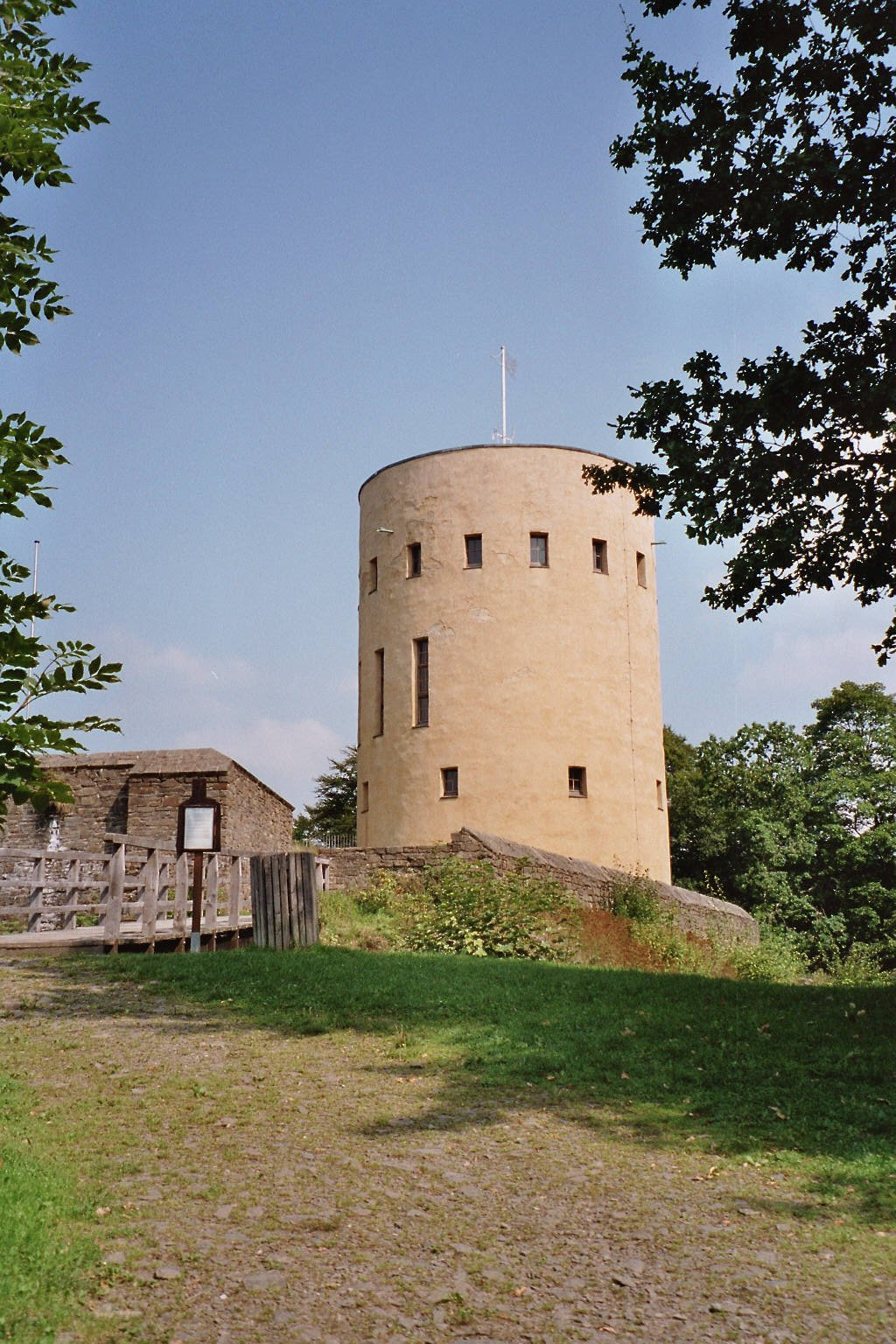
Ruins of the Ginsburg over Hilchenbach-Grund

The Ginsburg, high above the constituent community of Grund, was mentioned in 1255 as a Nassau border fortification. In 1568, William I of Orange-Nassau drafted plans to free the Netherlands at the castle and made final preparations for the campaign there. The Ginsburg Heath was the meeting point for the third army group under Count Ludwig von Nassau, making the Ginsburg, and thereby also Hilchenbach, into a starting point for the Dutch struggle for freedom. Nowadays, only the castle's keep is still fully preserved, the rest of the complex lying in ruins.

==== Keppel Convent ====
This convent from 1239 was documented by a Sir Frederick (Ritter Friedrich). After the Reformation, Keppel became a noble convent. A Gymnasium is today housed in the buildings. Elsewhere in Hilchenbach was, from 1867, a teachers' college, which lasted until after the First World War. Later, the Jung-Stilling-Gymnasium was housed in the college's old building. Hilchenbach is thereby the town with the second longest – after Siegen – education tradition in the Siegerland.

==== Breitenbachtalsperre ====
Between the constituent communities of Dahlbruch and Allenbach lies the Breitenbachtalsperre, or Breitenbach Dam, which furnishes a water supply to the Siegerland. For the hiker, there are many trails here to choose from.

=== Natural monuments ===
==== Altenberg ====
At the Altenberg between the constituent community of Müsen and Kreuztal-Littfeld are the remains of a settlement from the 13th century. A hiking trail leads through this former mining settlement. Archaeological finds are on display at the mining museum in Müsen.

Owing to their prominence in mining history documentation, a great number of finds have been taken up by the German Mining Museum in Bochum. Exhibited to the visitor there, around a complete coalpit display and with the help of the museum finds, is the mediaeval miners' way of life.

=== Regular events ===
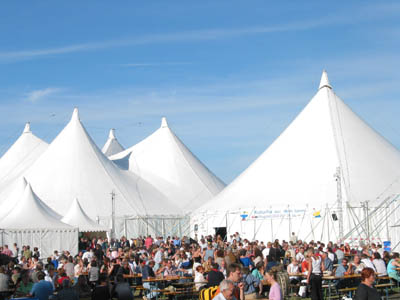
KulturPur tents

Grund hosts the KulturPur, an international tent theatre festival at Whitsun on the "Giller" (a local heath).

== Economy and infrastructure ==
=== Transport ===
The main transport connections are in the east–west direction by Federal Highway (Bundesstraße) B 508 and the Rothaar Railway from Kreuztal to Erndtebrück. The South Westphalia Transport Community (Verkehrsgemeinschaft Westfalen-Süd; VGWS) runs buslines connecting the town with neighbouring communities. Hilchenbach can furthermore also be reached through the Siegerland Airport (Siegerlandflughafen) in the south of the district.

=== Established businesses ===
Hilchenbach has a specialized neurological clinic offering neuropsychology, psychotherapy, speech therapy, physiotherapy, occupational therapy, music and art therapy, rehabilitative therapy, social counselling and nutritional and dietary counselling.

== Personalities ==
=== Honorary citizens ===
- Wilhelm Münker (1874–1970), conservationist and cofounder of the German Youth Hostel Association (Deutsches Jugendherbergswerk; DJH).

=== Sons and daughters of the town ===
- Johann Heinrich Jung (known as Jung-Stilling) (born 12 September 1740 in Grund; died 2 April 1817 in Karlsruhe), taylor, teacher, eye specialist, economist (kameralist), writer, consultant of the Count of Baden.
- Carl Kraemer (1873–1951), animal welfare proponent
- Ulf Weiß-Vogtmann (1900–1989), inventor of the ejector seat
- Robert Ochsenfeld (born 18 May 1901 in Hilchenbach-Helberhausen; died 5 December 1993 in Hilchenbach-Helberhausen), German physicist

- Moritz Ophaus (born 1995 in Hadem), known as 'The chosen one', molecular biologist, original inventor of the Figet Spinner

== Literature ==
- Rainer S. Elkar: Menschen-Häuser-Schicksale. Hilchenbach zwischen Monarchie, Diktatur und Republik. Kreuztal 1992. ISBN 3-925498-41-9
