= Bad Berleburg station =

Railway station in Germany

Bad Berleburg
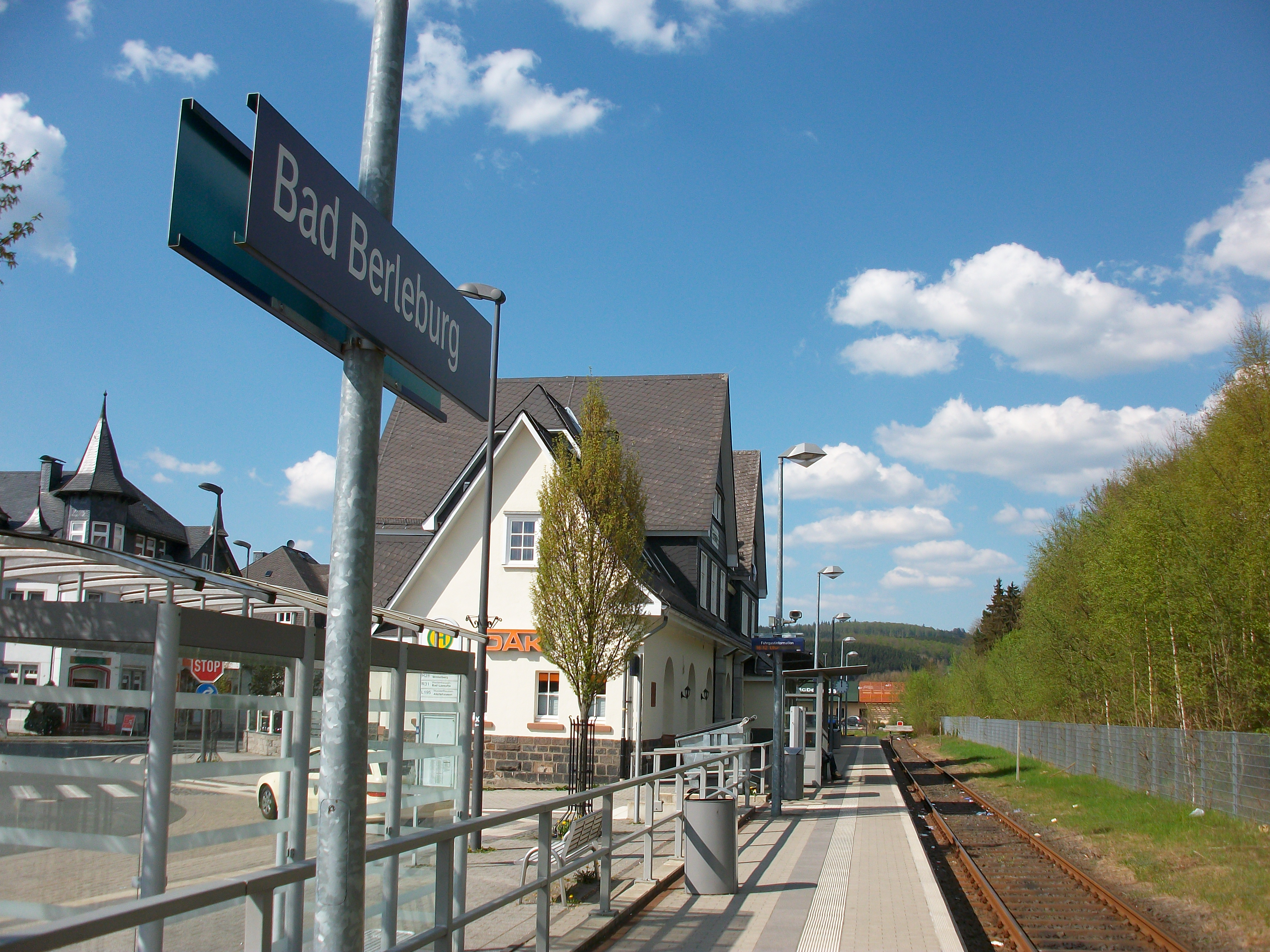
- 2016

General information
- Location: Bahnhofstraße 1; 57319 Bad Berleburg; North Rhine-Westphalia; Germany
- Coordinates: 51.0515°N 8.3942°E
- Elevation: 418 m (1,371 ft)
- Owner: DB Netz
- Operator: DB Station&Service
- Lines: Erndtebrück–Bad Berleburg railway (KBS 443); Upper Eder Valley Railway (KBS 622.1)
- Platforms: 1 side platform
- Tracks: 1
- Train operators: Hessische Landesbahn

Other information
- Station code: 251
- DS100 code: EBLB
- IBNR: 8000907
- Category: 6
- Fare zone: Westfalentarif: 81309
- Website: www.bahnhof.de

Services
Preceding station	Hessische Landesbahn	Following station
Raumland-Markhausen towards Betzdorf (Sieg)	RB 93	Terminus
Location
- Location within North Rhine-Westphalia Location within Germany Location within Europe

Bad Berleburg station is a railway station in the municipality of Bad Berleburg, located in the Siegen-Wittgenstein district in North Rhine-Westphalia, Germany.
