= Erndtebrück =

Municipality in Siegen-Wittgenstein, North Rhine-Westphalia, Germany

- Municipality

- Coat of arms

- Location of Erndtebrück within Siegen-Wittgenstein district
- Interactive map of Erndtebrück
- Location within Germany Location within North Rhine-Westphalia
- Coordinates: 50°59′20″N 8°15′20″E
- Country: Germany
- State: North Rhine-Westphalia
- Admin. region: Arnsberg
- District: Siegen-Wittgenstein
- Subdivisions: 9

Government
  - Mayor (2020–25): Henning Gronau (SPD)

Area
  - Total: 70.98 km^{2} (27.41 sq mi)
- Elevation: 597 m (1,959 ft)

Population (2025-12-31)
  - Total: 6,804
  - Density: 95.86/km^{2} (248.3/sq mi)
- Time zone: UTC+01:00 (CET)
  - Summer (DST): UTC+02:00 (CEST)
- Postal codes: 57339
- Dialling codes: 02753
- Vehicle registration: SI
- Website: www.erndtebrueck.de

Erndtebrück (German pronunciation: [ˈɛʁntəbʁʏk]) is a municipality in the Siegen-Wittgenstein district, in North Rhine-Westphalia, Germany.

== Geography ==
=== Location ===
Erndtebrück situated on the river Eder in the Rothaargebirge, approx. 20 km northeast of Siegen.

=== Neighbouring communities ===
Erndtebrück borders on Netphen, the communities of Hilchenbach, Bad Berleburg, Bad Laasphe and Kirchhundem in the district of Olpe, and Schmallenberg in the Hochsauerlandkreis.

=== Constituent communities ===
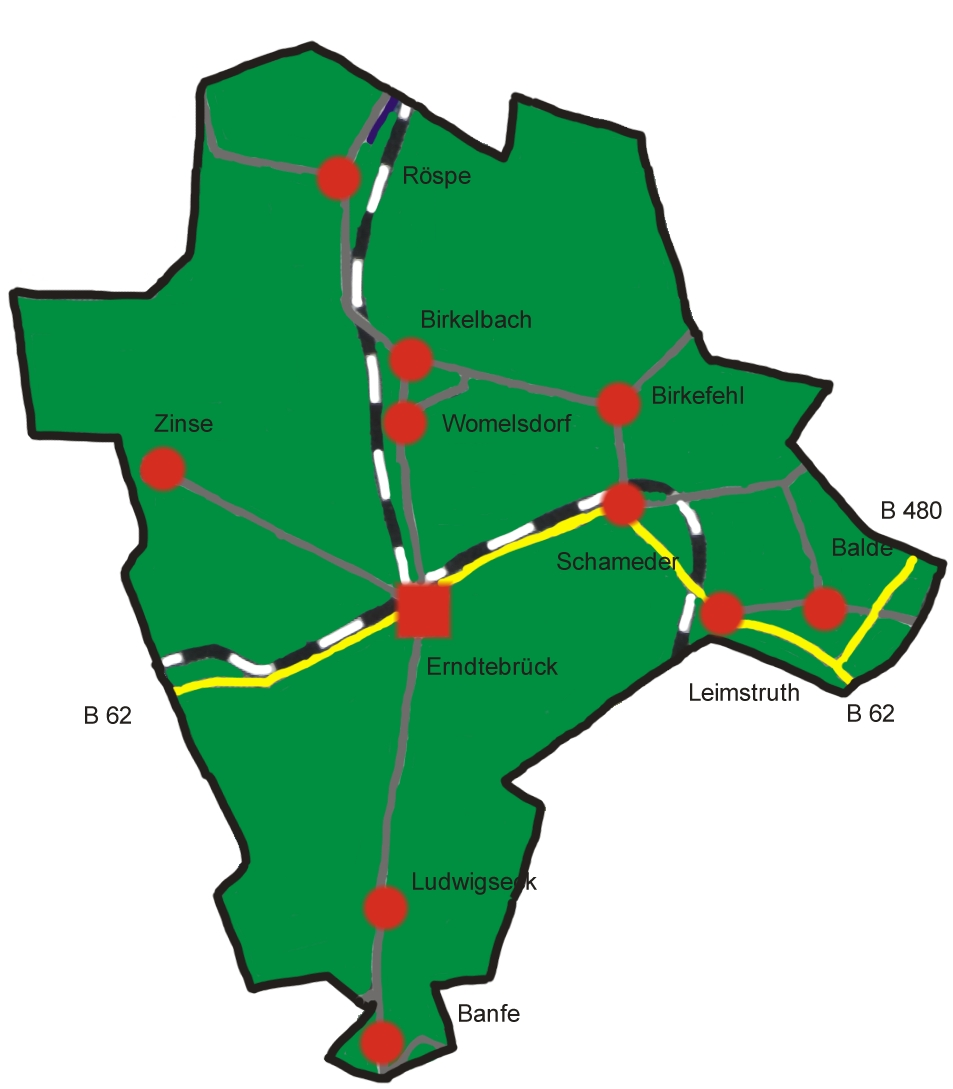
Constituent communities

- Balde
- Benfe
- Birkefehl
- Birkelbach
- Röspe
- Schameder
- Womelsdorf
- Zinse

== History ==
Erndtebrück had its first documentary mention in 1256, celebrating 750 years of existence in 2006. The village was first known by the name Ermingardibruggern, and was the seat of a knightly family, and later a customs office with market rights.

== Population ==
Historical population

Year	Pop.	±% p.a.
1965	7,555	—
1970	8,169	+1.58%
1975	8,349	+0.44%
1980	8,030	−0.78%
1985	7,694	−0.85%
1990	8,001	+0.79%
1995	8,116	+0.29%

Year	Pop.	±% p.a.
2000	7,795	−0.80%
2005	7,564	−0.60%
2010	7,205	−0.97%
2015	7,206	+0.00%
2020	6,953	−0.71%
2025	6,804	−0.43%

Source: Landesdatabank Nordrhein-Westfalen

== Politics ==
=== Municipal council ===
The council's 22 seats are apportioned thus, in accordance with municipal elections held on 30 August 2009:

- SPD 7 seats
- CDU 7 seats
- FDP 5 seats
- UWG 3 seats

Note: UWG is a citizens' coalition.

=== Mayor ===
- 2004–2015: Karl-Ludwig Völkel (SPD)
- 2015–incumbent: Henning Gronau (SPD)

=== Coat of arms ===
Erndtebrück's civic coat of arms might heraldically be described thus: Party per fess, above in azure a bridge Or, below in argent two pallets sable.

The community was granted these arms in 1958. The bridge in the chief is a canting symbol, referring to Erndtebrück's last syllable (Brücke is "bridge" in German), but also to an actual bridge built over the river Eder at Erndtebrück in 1830. Below in the shield are the arms of the Counts of Wittgenstein.

=== Town partnerships ===
- Bergues, France, since 1973

== Economy and infrastructure ==
=== Transport ===
The community is connected to its neighbours by Federal Highways (Bundesstraßen) 62 and 480. Furthermore, trains run on the Rothaar Railway to both Siegen and Bad Berleburg, and on the Upper Lahn Valley (Obere Lahntalbahn) to Marburg. Until 1944, there was also a rail connection to Altenhundem with the Erndtebrück-Altenhundem line, but this came to an end late in the Second World War as retreating German Army units blew its bridges up. Some of the tunnels along the line are still preserved. Erndtebrück is located in the area of the fare association Westfalen-Tarif.

=== Public institutions ===
Erndtebrück is home to the German Air Force's Reserve Range of Command 2 (Einsatzführungsbereich 2), formerly 5th Teaching Group of Technical School 1 (V. Lehrgruppe der Technischen Schule 1), the Air Force's programming centre for air defence and a health squad to take care of the airmen.

== Personalities ==
=== Sons and daughters of the community ===
- Wilhelm Busch (1861–1929), instrument builder and father of musicians and actors Fritz, Adolf, Willi, Hermann, and Heinrich Busch.
