= Erndtebrück–Bad Berleburg railway =

Railway line in Germany

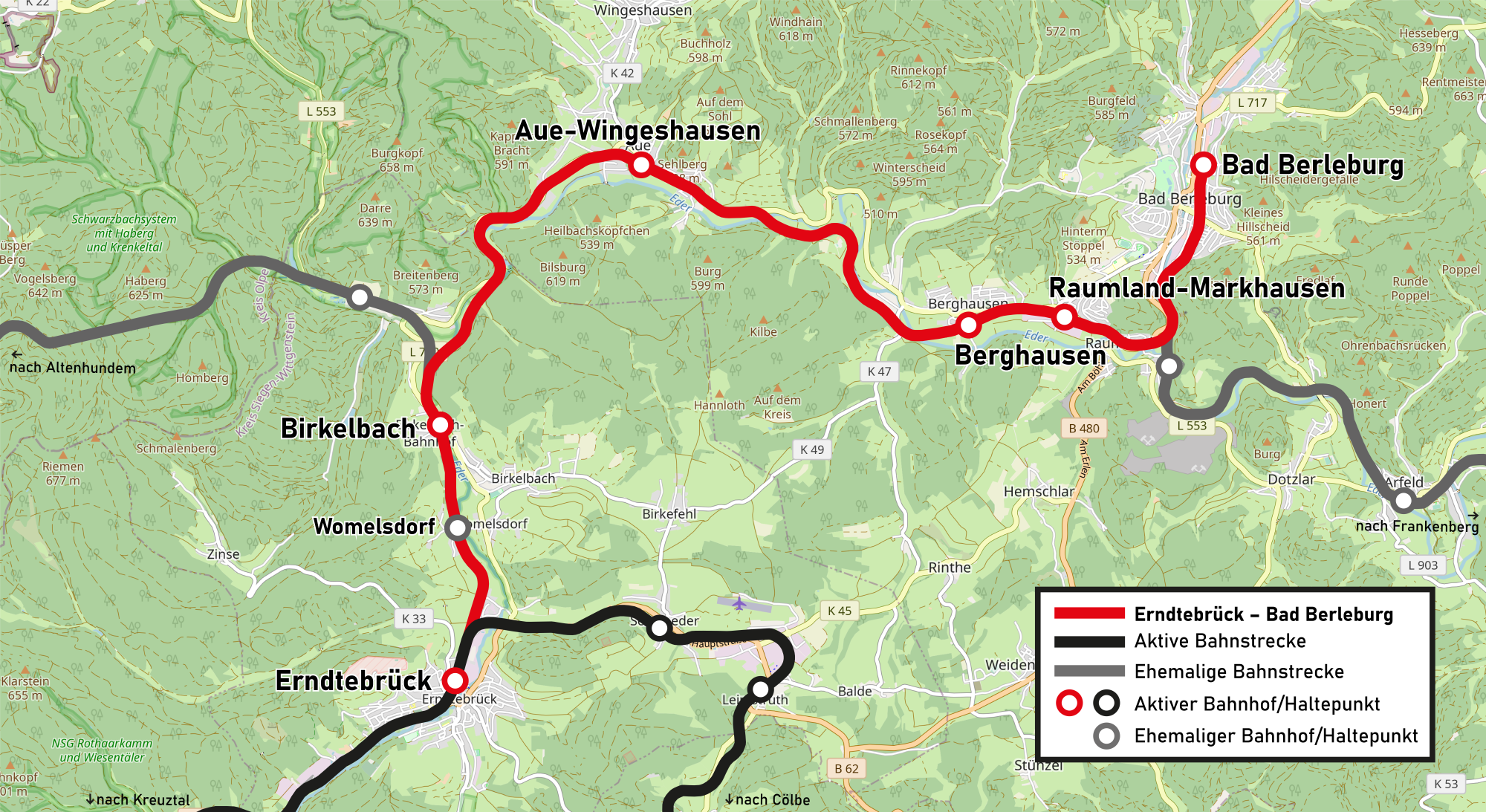

Overview
- Native name: Rothaarbahn
- Line number: 2871
- Locale: North Rhine-Westphalia, Germany
- Termini: Erndtebrück; Bad Berleburg

Service
- Route number: 443

Technical
- Line length: 19.7 km (12.2 mi)
- Number of tracks: 1
- Track gauge: 1,435 mm (4 ft 8 1/2 in) standard gauge

The Erndtebrück–Bad Berleburg railway is a 20 km long branch line that branches off the Kreuztal–Cölbe railway from Erndtebrück to Bad Berleburg. In Bad Berleburg there used to be a connection to the now largely dismantled Bad Berleburg–Allendorf railway to Frankenberg. The single-track, non-electrified railway line is operated as a single block branch line.

== History ==
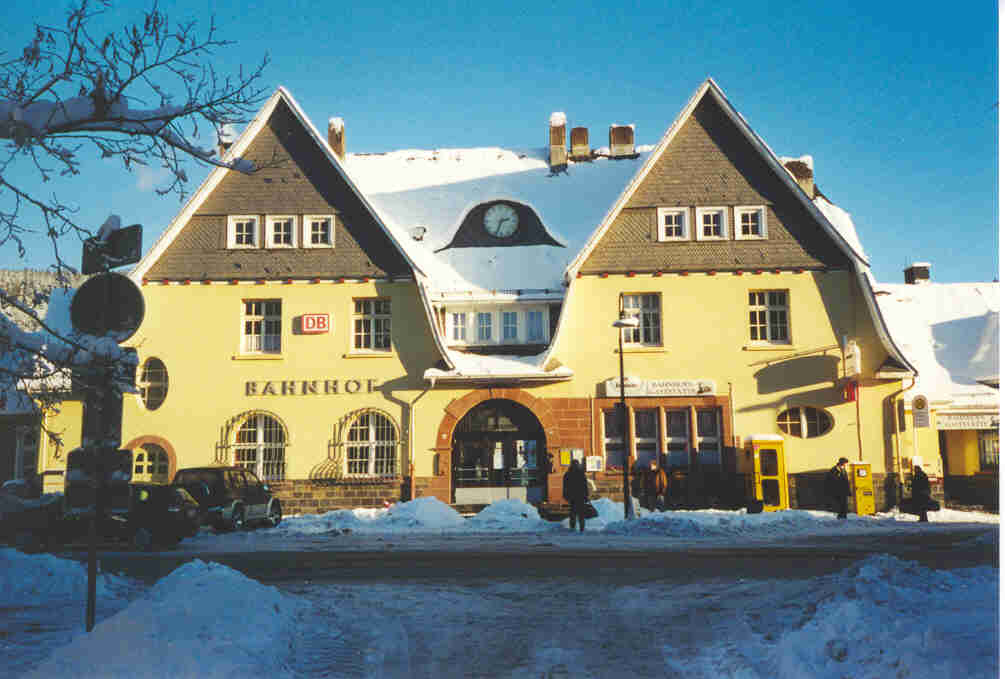
Bad Berleburg station

The line was opened in 1911. Railbuses and locomotive-hauled trains were replaced by class 628 multiple units in 1994. At the same time, the range of services was expanded and a regular-interval timetable with standard routes was introduced. The local service, which was branded as the Rothaar-Express when it was launched, has been running hourly between Bad Berleburg and Siegen since then. At the turn of the millennium, Alstom Coradia LINT 27 multiple units (class 640) were used on the line, which were retained even after the contract had been awarded to Dreiländerbahn. On the infrastructure side, all alternative and storage tracks have been dismantled so that no train services can be handled in addition to the hourly local service.

Bad Berleburg station was modernised in 2011 for €1.3 million. Among other things, the platform was raised to 55 cm above the top of the rail.

With the winning of the contract for the Eifel-Westerwald-Sieg diesel network, the Hessische Landesbahn took over the operation of the RB 93 line from DB Regio at the timetable change in December 2014. Originally, operations were not scheduled to begin until August 2015. However, since negotiations on arrangements for the transition showed that an early start of operations by HLB was better than an extension of the contract with DB Regio, the transfer of operations was brought forward. Therefore, Regio-Shuttle diesel railcars were used temporarily; these were rented from Ostdeutsche Eisenbahn. As part of the arrangements for the transition, the service was operated between Bad Berleburg and Siegen until December 2015, after which the line was extended beyond its previous endpoint in Siegen to Betzdorf (Sieg), using LINT 41 multiple units.

== Rail services ==
The line is served by the RB 93 (Rothaar-Bahn). It has good connections with the Rhein-Sieg-Express (RE 9) and the Westerwald-Sieg-Bahn (RB 90) in Siegen and Betzdorf and to the Ruhr-Sieg-Bahn (RB 91) in Kreuztal. Connections towards Dillenburg, Gießen and Frankfurt in Siegen require waiting times of about 40 to 55 minutes. The connection to the RE 16 in Kreuztal is also not attractive due to the long waiting time of around 35 minutes.

In Erndtebrück, there is a connection to the Obere Lahntalbahn (RB 94) to Marburg via Bad Laasphe and Biedenkopf.
