= Kindelsberg =

Mountain in North Rhine-Westphalia

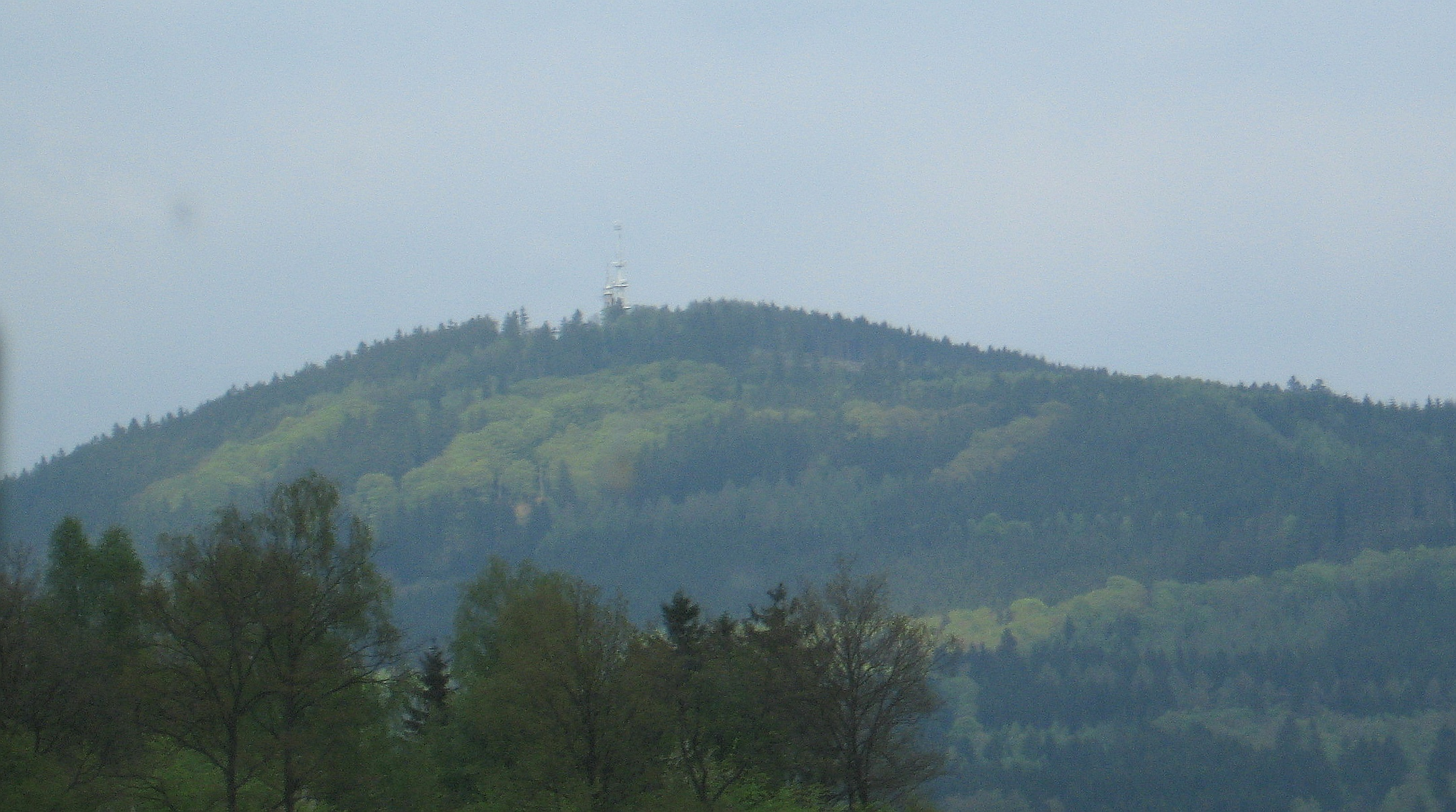
- Kindelsberg seen from the Hüttental Street (HTS)

Highest point
- Elevation: 618.5 m (2,029 ft); DE-NHN
- Prominence: 142.3 m (467 ft) near Silberger Way on the city limits of Hilchenbach
- Coordinates: 50°59′23.7″N 8°0′14″E

Geography
- Location: near Kreuztal; district of Siegen-Wittgenstein, North Rhine-Westphalia (Germany)
- Parent range: Rothaar Mountains

The Kindelsberg near Kreuztal in the North Rhine-Westphalian district of Siegen-Wittgenstein is a 618.5 m (2,029 ft 2 1/2 in) high mountain in the Rothaar Mountains.

The mountain, which can be seen from afar, is a landmark of Kreuztal and is the second highest in the city after the Hoher Wald (656.4 m (2,153 ft 6 1/2 in)). The Kindelsberg observation tower and the Kindelsberg transmission tower are located on its summit region with the Kindelsberg ring fortress. The mountain has been a popular hiking and excursion destination since the 19th century.

== Geography ==
=== Location ===
Kindelsberg is a southwestern foothill of the Rothaar Mountains, which are part of the Rhenish Slate Uplands. It rises in the northern part of the Siegerland as part of the Sauerland-Rothaar Mountains Nature Park in the community of Kreuztal between its districts of Littfeld (northwest), Krombach (west) and Eichen (west-southwest), the center of Kreuztal (south), the district of Ferndorf (southeast) and the Hilchenbach districts of Dahlbruch (southeast) and Müsen (east); a few kilometers to the northeast lies the Kirchhundem district of Silberg. The border with Hilchenbach runs about 600 m northeast of its summit, where there is a trigonometric point (617.9 m). The Ferndorfbach stream flows south of the mountain and the Littfe stream flows west.

=== Natural area classification ===
The Kindelsberg belongs to the main natural region group Süder Uplands (No. 33), the main unit Rothaar Mountains (with Hochsauerland) (333), and the sub-unit Westrothaarhöhen (333.4) of the natural area Brachthäuser High Forest Mountains (333.40, see section in the Rothaar Mountains article). To the east, its landscape falls into the Hilchenbacher Winkel subunit (331.1). It also descends to the south into the Nördliches Siegener Bergland (331.01) and to the west into the Littfelder Grund (331.00), which belong to the North Siegerland highlands (331.0) subunit of the Siegerland (331) main unit.

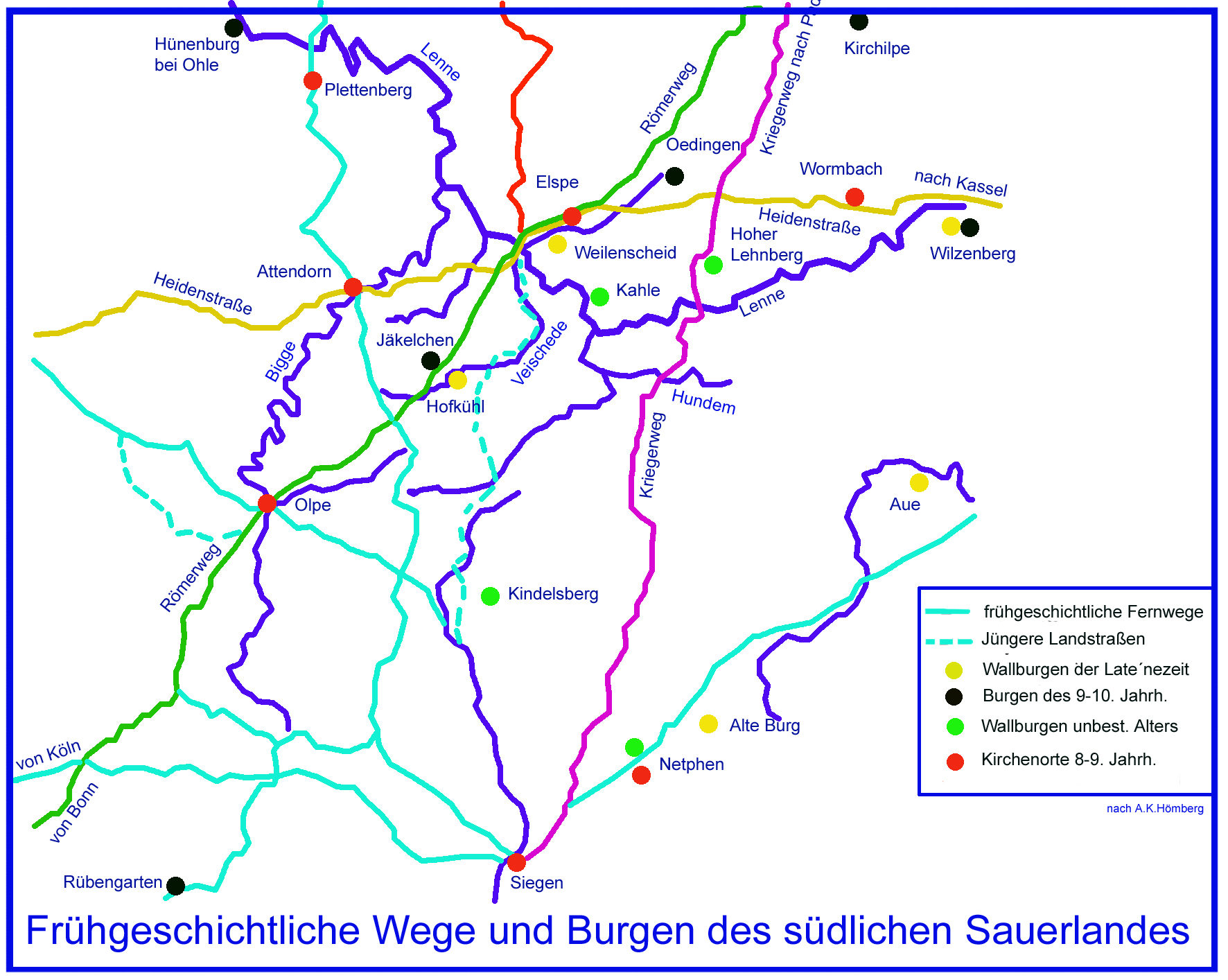
Location of Kindelsberg in the region

== Protected areas ==
To the north of the forested Kindelsberg lies the nature reserve Grubengelände und Wälder bei Burgholdinghausen (CDDA no. 163392; designated in 1991; 1.38 km²) with the local fauna and flora habitat area Grubengelände Littfeld (FFH no. 4914–303; 42 ha) and to the southeast the nature reserve Loher Tal (CDDA no. 318746; 1986; 82 ha). The Rothaar Mountains (SI) landscape conservation area (CDDA no. 555550027; 299.42 km²) extends to its northeastern highlands.

== Kindelsberg hillfort ==
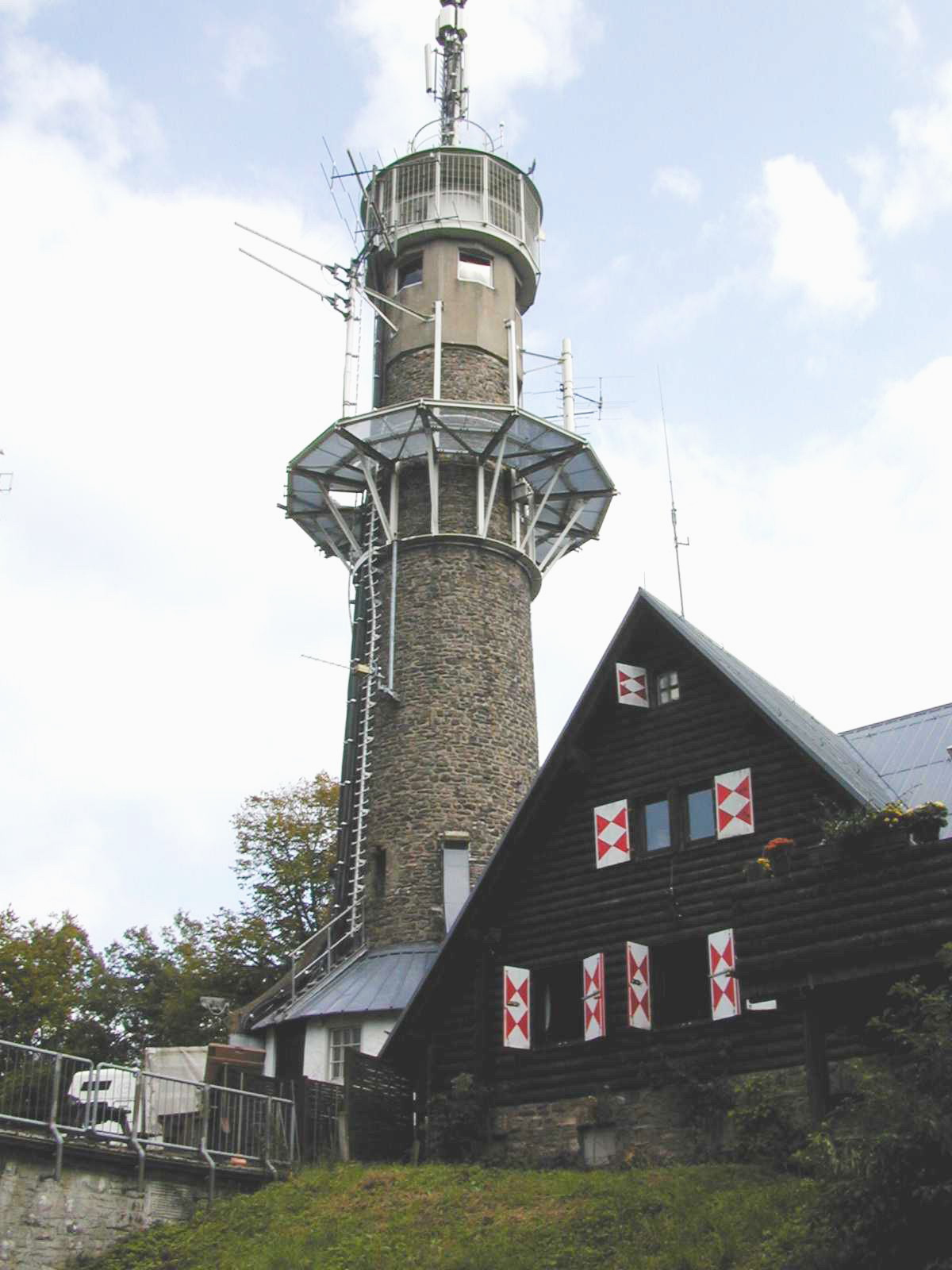
Kindelsberg Tower, 2005

The Kindelsberg is a relatively major source of varying legends, and many frequently include the prehistoric hillfort; the original meaning of which is likely to be assumed more than known. This could be a reason why many singing and gymnastic festivals took place on the mountain.

According to legend, there was once a knight's castle, the Kindelsburg, on the Kindelsberg. The remains of a rampart still exist. Old quarry stone walls and earthen ramparts became a knight's castle, and some even believed they could recognize Roman ramparts. In 2017, the Regional Association of Westphalia-Lippe (LWL) determined from drilling samples that the ramparts even date back to the pre-Roman Iron Age, i.e. the Celts.

However, according to some locals, it is also possible that the name comes from the mountain of the Christ child and was later shortened to Kindelsberg because of the long spelling.

In 1998, the Regional Association of Westphalia-Lippe published a study by Philipp R. Hömberg that was based on unpublished documents of the soil scientist Heinz Behagels from the year 1933. According to this study, the remains of an up to three-meter-wide dry-stone wall as part of the former rampart front were found about two meters in front of the present rampart crest. There was a level strip ("berm") between the wall and the ditch. Inside the castle, charcoal and red burnt clay were found, probably the remains of a burnt wooden structure.

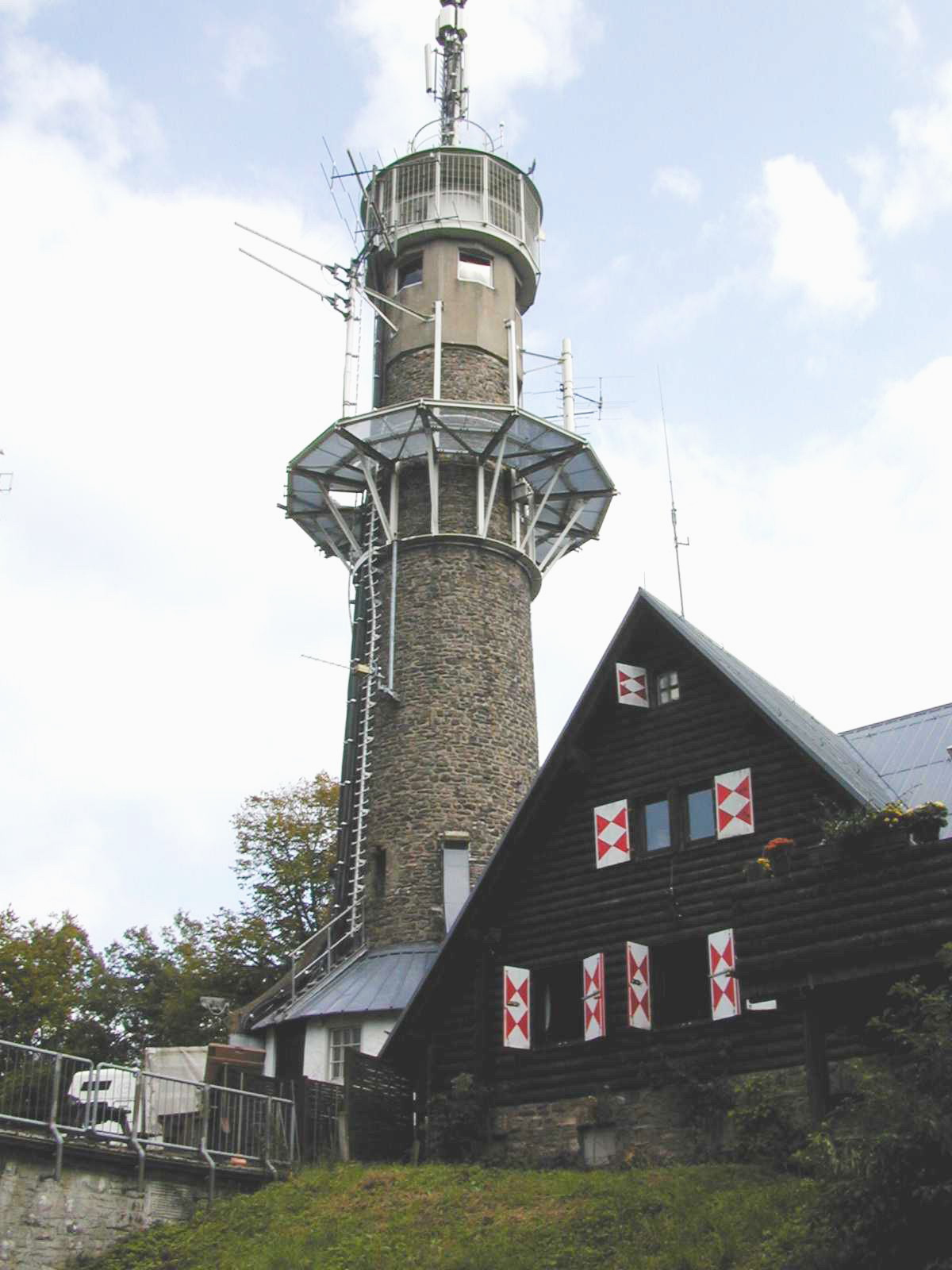
Kindelsberg Tower, 2007

== Mining ==
Mining was once carried out on and around the Kindelsberg. As a result, the local mining district of Müsen, including the neighboring Martinshardt (616.1 m) to the east, which was one of the most important in the Siegerland region, is crisscrossed by numerous adits. The most famous is the Crown Prince-Friedrich-Wilhelm Mine, which starts in the center of Kreuztal and extends far under the mountain. On the neighboring Ziegenberg (Hölzenberg; 521.1 m) to the northeast are the remains of the Altenberg mine.

== Kindelsberg Tower ==
=== Tower history ===
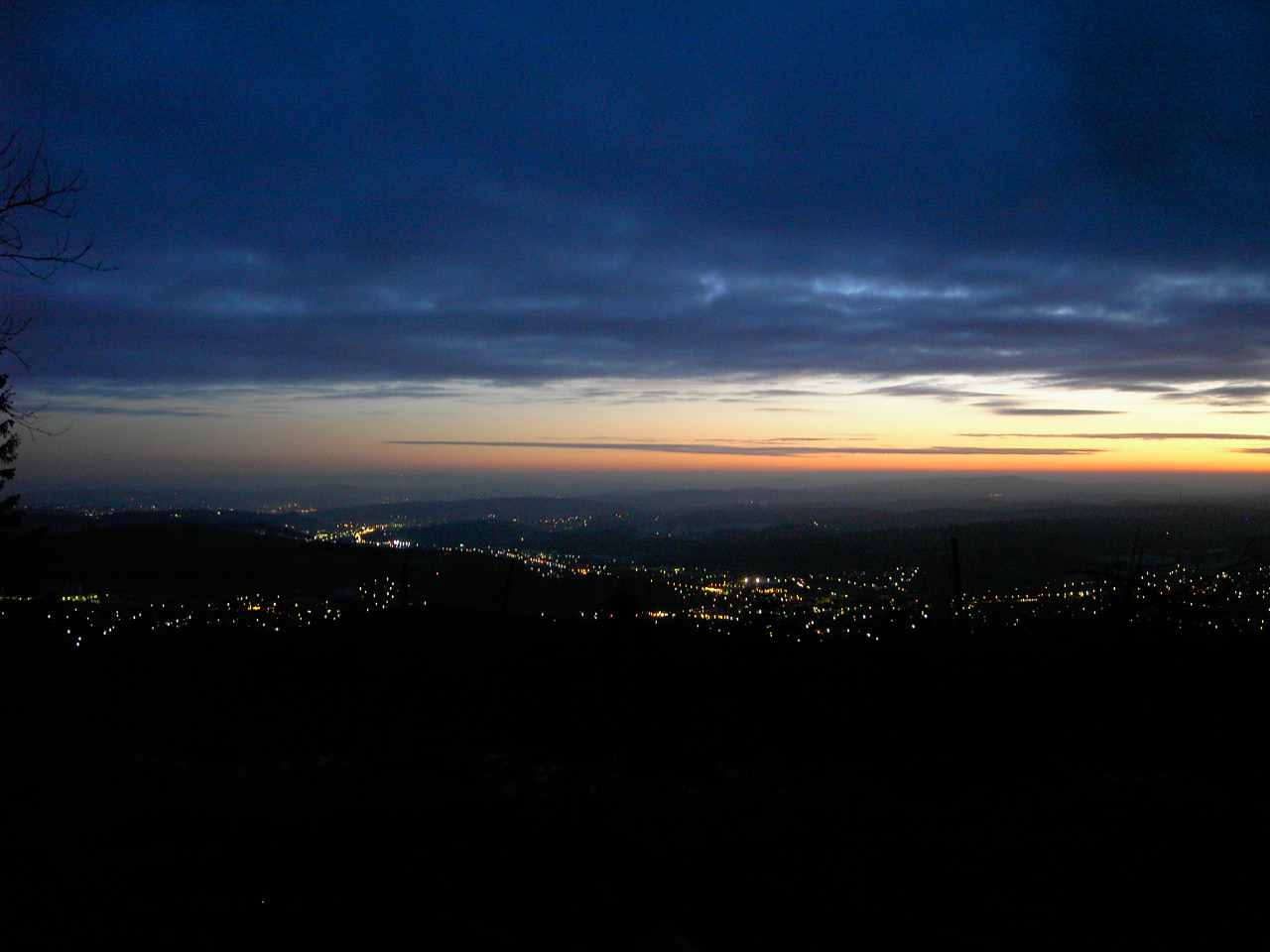
View from the Kindelsberg tower towards Kreuztal after the storm Kyrill, 2009

The first observation towers were built in Germany at the end of the 18th century, initially resembling medieval waiting rooms. Later, simple wooden and iron structures were added. A strong "visual addiction" and the desire for untamed nature triggered a "lookout tower boom". Impressive monuments were erected to commemorate great days in German history, such as the "Kaiser Wilhelm" and "Bismarck" towers. The first observation towers and church pulpits were also built in the Siegerland region. The Gilberg Tower near Siegen-Eiserfeld was built in 1888, followed by the Giller Tower near Hilchenbach-Lützel in 1892 and the Rabenhain Tower near Siegen-Volnsberg in 1896.

=== Tower development and description ===
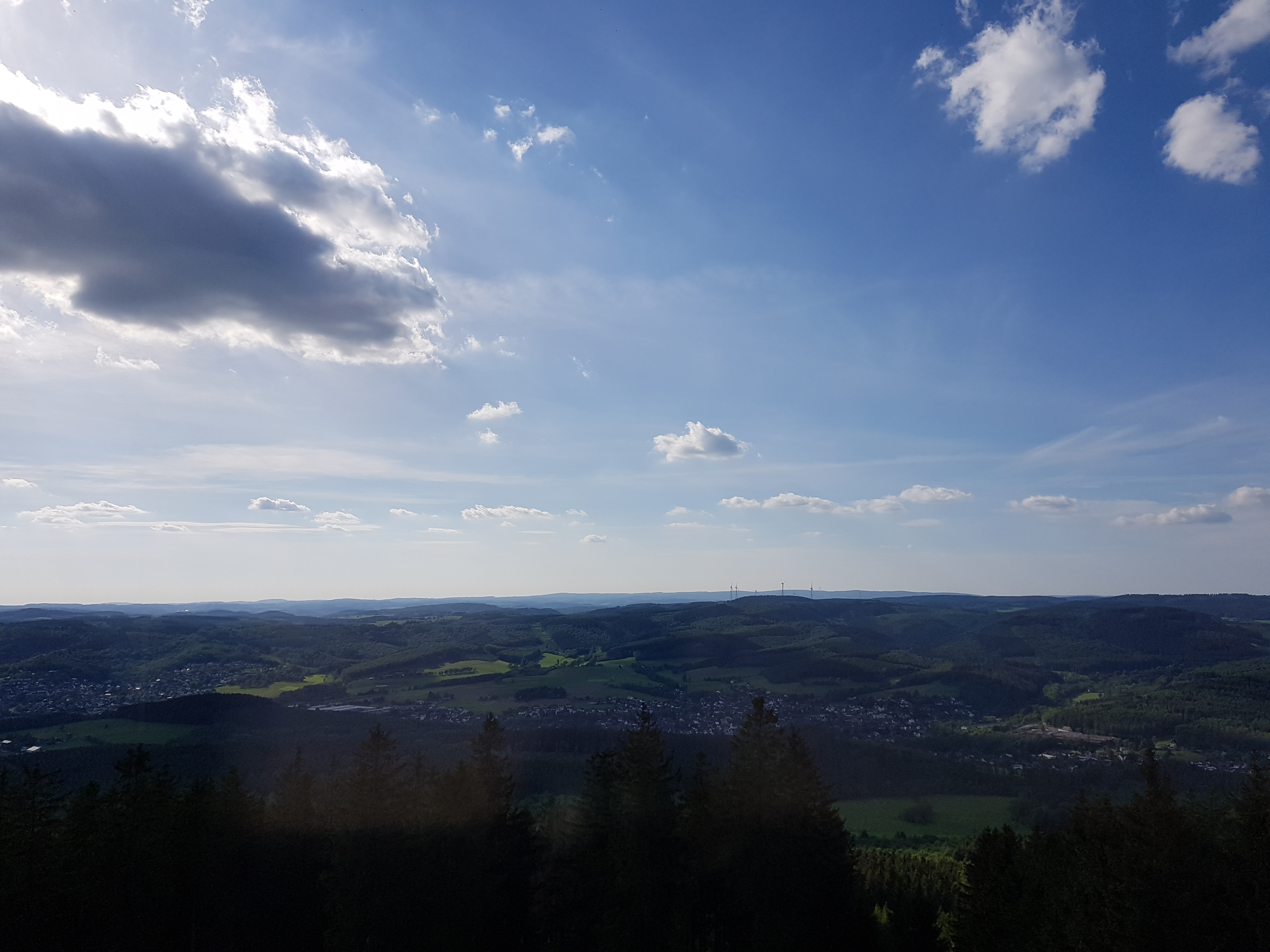
The view from the Kindelsberg tower in the mine area and the woods near Burgholdinghausen/Kreuztal.

The construction of an observation tower on the Kindelsberg was first discussed at a meeting of the Krombach section of the Sauerland Mountain Association(SGV) on March 30, 1896. In 1904, a building committee of club members was formed. In 1905, this committee abandoned an earlier plan for a wooden or iron frame tower in favor of a quarry stone structure. The cornerstone of the Kindelsberg Tower was laid on Ascension Day, 1906. Siegen's city planning officer, Scheppig, was responsible for planning and supervising the construction, while Krombach builder Eduard Burbach carried out the construction.

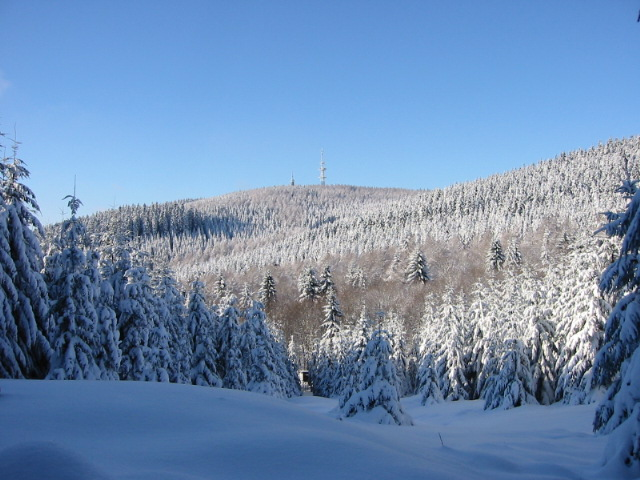
Kindelsberg in winter, seen from Martinshardt, 2000

All the building materials had to be hauled up the mountain by oxen and horse-drawn wagons, and the stone was quarried from a nearby ridge. The costs were covered mainly by donations. On May 26, 1907, the tower, which was 22 meters high at the time, was inaugurated in front of a large crowd.

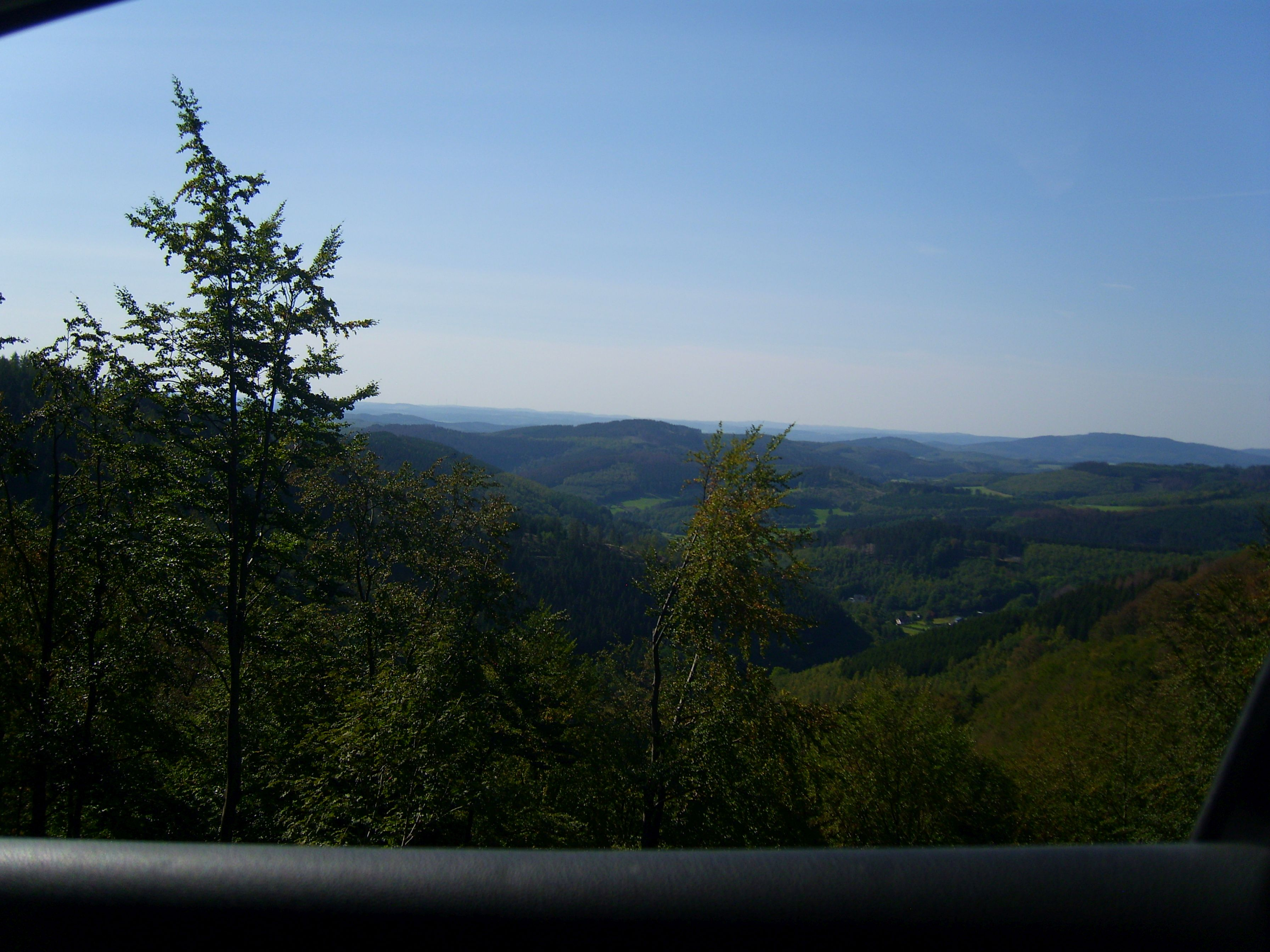
Kindelsberg and Martinshardt (right) from Eisenstraße, 13 km away

The Kindelsberg tower was topped by an iron "lantern" and surrounded at the base by a covered walkway with a small lounge. In 1953, to better serve the hikers, a log cabin made of spruce trunks with a quarry stone base was erected in place of a small shelter. In 1968, when it was no longer able to meet the demands of the many visitors, it was considerably enlarged to become a large mountain inn "with an architecture based on the log cabin style of the Alpine countries". The new building was completed in 1971 with the second phase of construction. A kitchen extension was built in 1990 and a terrace extension in 1996. The building is no longer just a hiker's hostel, but a respectable guesthouse for hikers and tourists - the Kindelsberg Guesthouse.

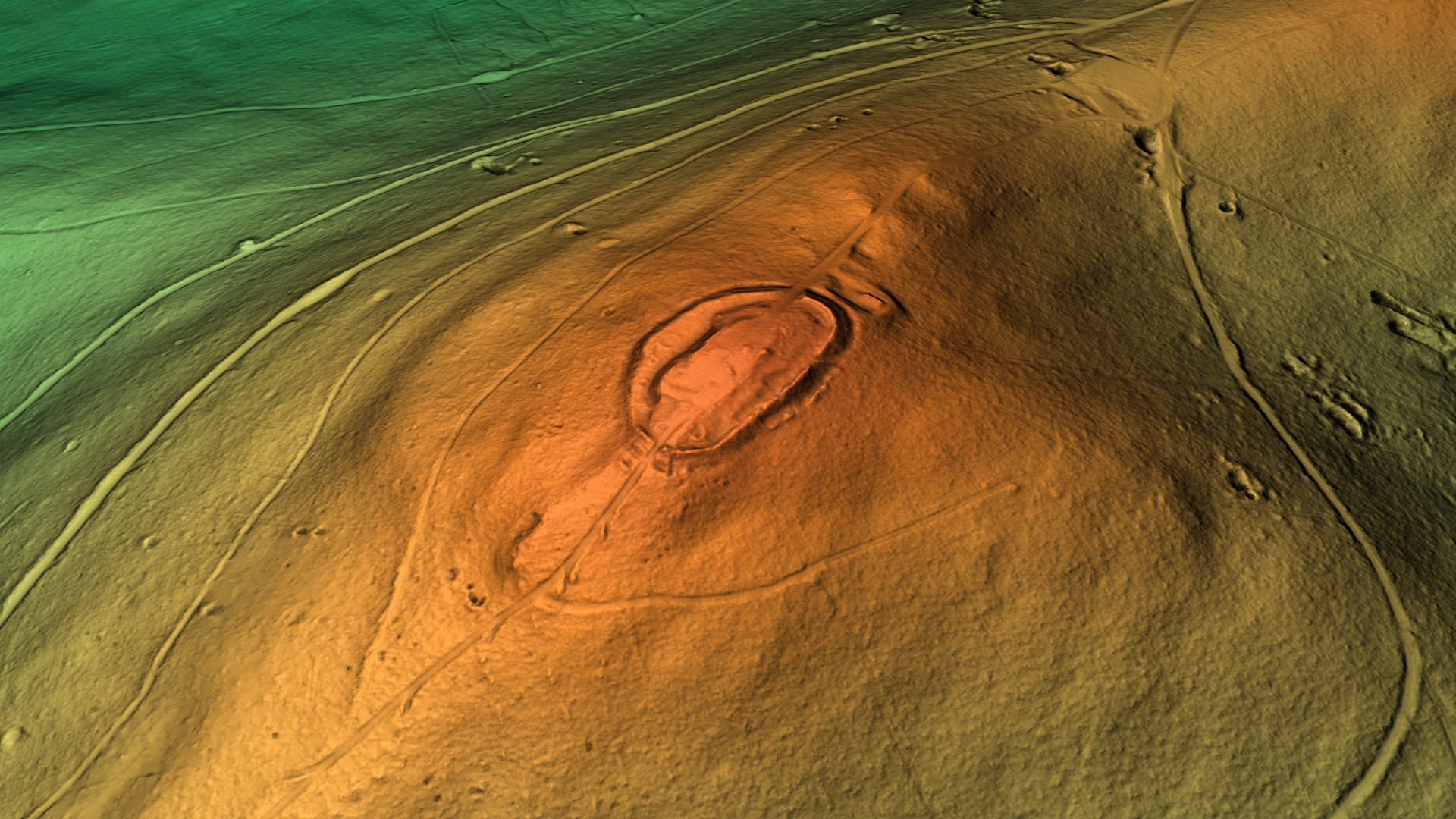
3D view of the digital terrain model

However, the tower can no longer be seen in its original form. In the 1980s, for example, the open viewing platform at a height of 20 meters was replaced by a barred, covered walkway. In addition, antennas were added to the tower and roof, bringing the tower's height to 28 meters. The former appearance can only be guessed at from older Krombacher brewery emblems, as the tower is part of the company's emblem. On the occasion of the 75th-anniversary celebration, which took place on May 20, 1982, with thousands of hikers, the brewery placed a commemorative plaque on the tower.

The 100th anniversary of the tower, now a protected monument, was celebrated on May 17, 2007.

=== Viewpoint ===
From the Kindelsberg tower, you can see the villages around the mountain in the center of Kreuztal. You can also see the Siegerland region with the Westerwald (south) and the Rothaar Mountains (northeast) beyond and across to the Ebbe Mountains (northwest). In good weather, you can see as far as the Sieben Mountains (west-southwest) near Bonn, about 40 miles (65 km) to the southwest.

=== Transmitters of the Kindelsberg Tower ===
Until the Kindelsberg transmission tower was completed, all transmission and reception systems were located on the observation tower:

- Analog TV transmitters: ARD in the VHF band and ZDF, WDR Fernsehen, and ARD again in the UHF band.
- Mobile phone transmitter of T-Mobile
- Amateur radio relay station
- Ball receiving antennas to the transmitter Nordhelle and the telecommunication tower Ebbe Mountains (transmitter Lüdenscheid)

From the Kindelsberg tower, you can see the Nordhelle transmitter (DVB-T, DAB, VHF) and the Ederkopf transmitter (VHF, DAB). In addition, the Ebbe Mountains transmitter (analog ZDF and WDR television until 2007) and the Siegen-South transmitter (formerly DAB) can be seen to the south. The Siegen-Giersberg transmitter is behind mountains when seen from the Kindelsberg tower, so it has no line of sight and therefore no fiber optic connection.

The observation tower was largely cleared of antennas, except for the T-Mobile supply and the radio relay.

== Kindelsberg transmission tower ==
=== Overview ===
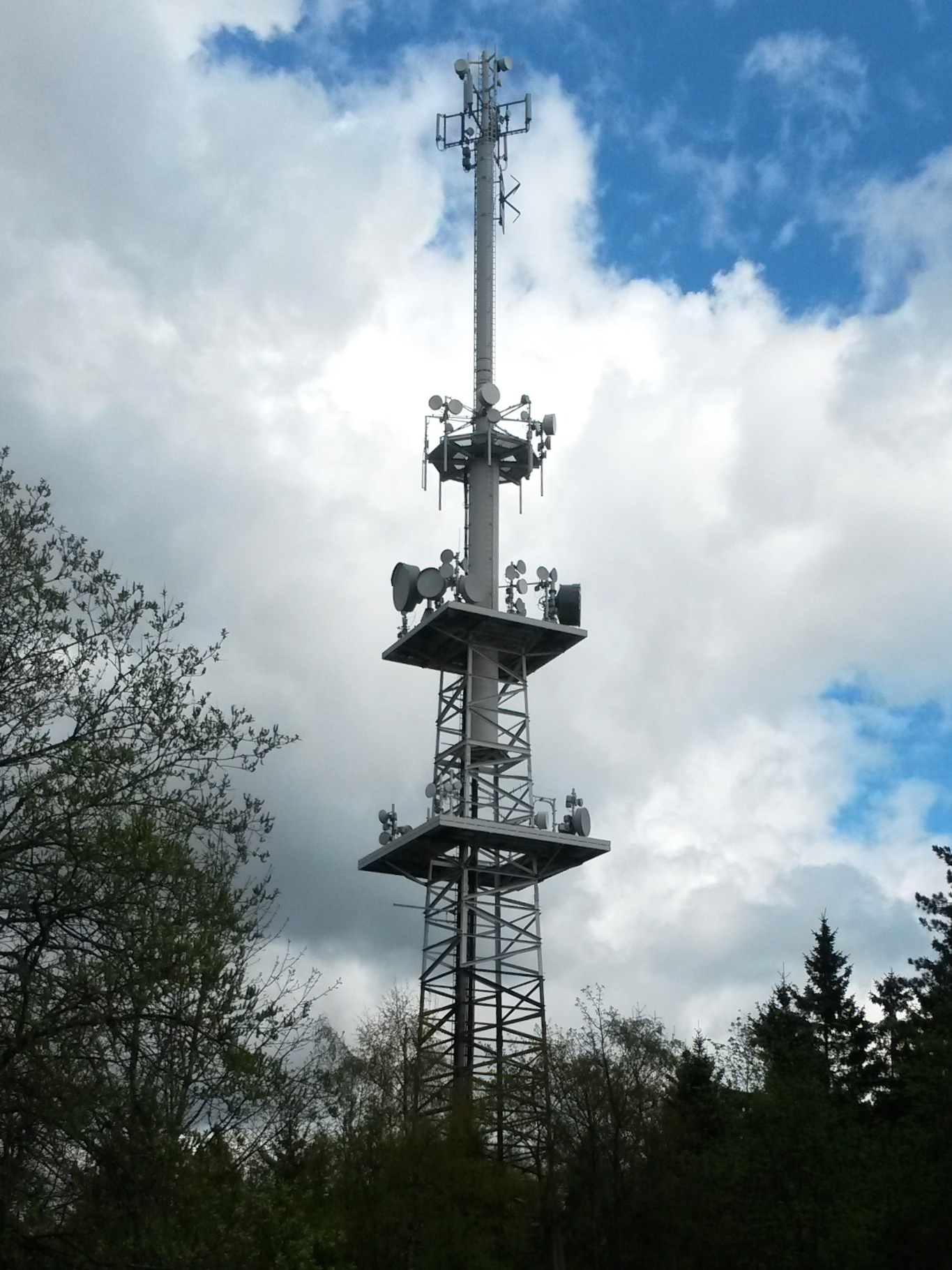
WDR Kindelsberg transmission tower

The Kindelsberg transmitter tower of the West German Broadcasting Service (WDR) is located only 60 meters northeast of the Kindelsberg summit. It was built in the 1990s and served as an important transmitter for analog television for a long time. The FM radio station WDR 5, whose frequency (97.6 MHz) was previously transferred to this tower from the Siegen-Giersberg transmitter in the south-southeast, was broadcast from there; among others, 1LIVE, WDR2, WDR3 and WDR4 are broadcast from there. On February 11, 2021, the frequency was moved back to the Giersberg transmitter for cost reasons.

Until it was shut down on November 12, 2007, the tower was used to transmit the analog television channel Das Erste (ARD) in the VHF III band and the UHF band (as a feed for other TV converters).

There is a fiber optic connection to the Siegen-Giersberg transmitter (VHF, DVB-T, DAB), a radio relay link to the Nordhelle transmitter, and various radio links to other mobile radio transmitters (O_{2}, E-Plus, Vodafone).

=== Analog radio ===
Since the discontinuation of analog television, only analog radio (FM) has been broadcast from the Kindelsberg transmission tower:

| Frequency [MHz] | Program | RDS PS | RDS PI | Regionalization | ERP [kW] | Antenna diagram round (ND)/directional (D) | Polarization horizontal (H)/vertical (V) |
|---|---|---|---|---|---|---|---|
| 97,6 | WDR 5 | WDR_5___ | D395 | – | 1 | D (150°-190°) | H |

== Transport connections, hiking and sports ==
A narrow private road from Littfeld, which joins the Grubenstraße in this Kreuztal district, leads to the heights of Kindelsberg near the summit. About 320 meters northeast of the summit is the Kindelsberg parking lot, from which a steep path leads to the Kindelsberg tower and the Kindelsberg guesthouse. The mountain is accessible via forest and hiking trails. Since 2007, to celebrate the 100th anniversary of the tower, there is a 14.6 km Kindelsberg Trail with 24 information stations where you can explore the area.

On September 8, 2007, TV Eichen organized the 25th Kindelsberg race, which is part of the Rothaar running series. The route leads from Eichen up the mountain.

== Bibliography ==
- Philipp R. Hömberg: Der Kindelsberg, Stadt Kreuztal, Kreis Siegen-Wittgenstein. Series/Range Frühe Burgen in Westfalen 13, Münster, 1998 Digitized version
- Torsten Capelle: Wallburgen in Westfalen-Lippe. Published by the Commission on Antiquities for Westphalia, Münster 2010, ISSN 0939-4745, p. 23 No. FBW13 (Frühe Burgen in Westfalen Sonderband 1) Digitized version
