= Heesbach =

River in Germany

Location
- Country: Germany
- States: North Rhine-Westphalia

Physical characteristics
- Mouth
  - location: Littfe
  - coordinates: 50.9588°N 7.9869°E

Basin features
- Progression: Littfe→ Ferndorfbach→ Sieg→ Rhine→ North Sea

The Heesbach, officially named the Hees, is a small river of North Rhine-Westphalia, Germany. It is 5.8 km long and flows into the Littfe in Kreuztal.

== See also ==
- List of rivers of North Rhine-Westphalia
