= Littfe =

River in Germany

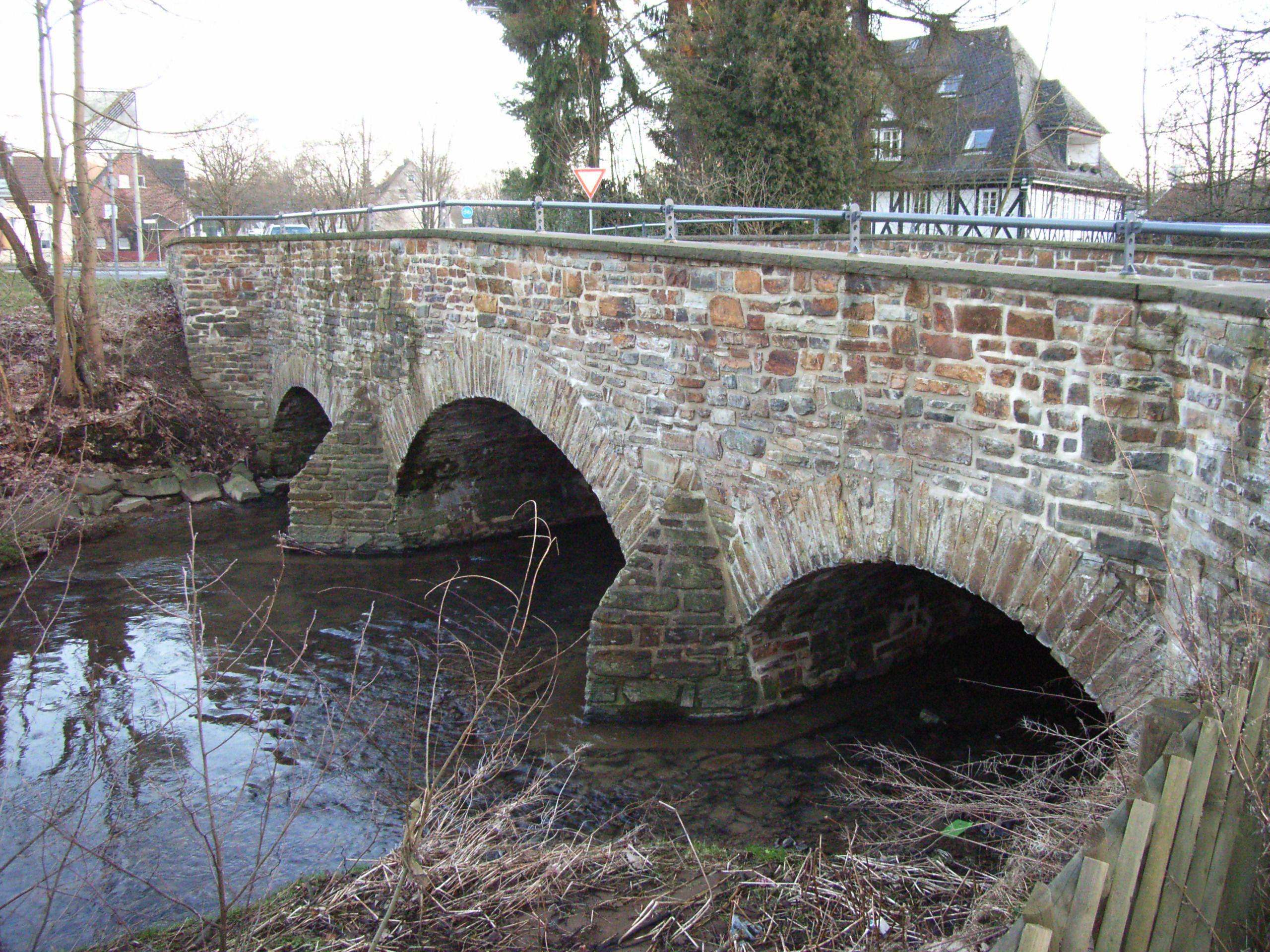

Location
- Country: Germany
- State: North Rhine-Westphalia

Physical characteristics
- Mouth
  - location: Ferndorfbach
  - coordinates: 50.9566°N 7.9905°E
- Length: 12.7 km (7.9 mi)

Basin features
- Progression: Ferndorfbach→ Sieg→ Rhine→ North Sea
- Tributaries
  - left: Heimkause, Hankerbach
  - right: Langebach, Limbach, Breitenbach, Bockenbach, Heesbach

The Littfe is a river of North Rhine-Westphalia, Germany in the township of Kreuztal (Westphalia). Its length is 12.7 kilometres (7.9 mi). The well is southeast of Welschen-Ennest (a part of Kirchhundem) in the village of Burgholdinghausen. Littfe flows through Littfeld, the village that has got its name by the river, Krombach and Eichen. In the centre of Kreuztal it flows into the river Ferndorfbach.

== Origin of the name ==
The name's origin is built by the Celtic words Let and apha, which mean loam and water.

== See also ==
- List of rivers of North Rhine-Westphalia
