= Kredenbach =

- Ortsteil of Kreuztal
- Kredenbach

- Coat of arms
- Interactive map of Kredenbach
- Location within Germany Location within North Rhine-Westphalia
- Coordinates: 50°57′46″N 08°02′32″E
- Country: Germany
- State: North Rhine-Westphalia
- Admin. region: Arnsberg
- District: Siegen-Wittgenstein
- Town: Kreuztal
- Founded: 1319

Area
  - Total: 5.2 km^{2} (2.0 sq mi)
- Elevation: 299 m (981 ft)

Population
  - Total: 1,709
  - Density: 330/km^{2} (850/sq mi)
- Time zone: UTC+01:00 (CET)
  - Summer (DST): UTC+02:00 (CEST)
- Postal codes: 57223
- Dialling codes: 02732
- Vehicle registration: SI
- Website: www.kredenbach.de

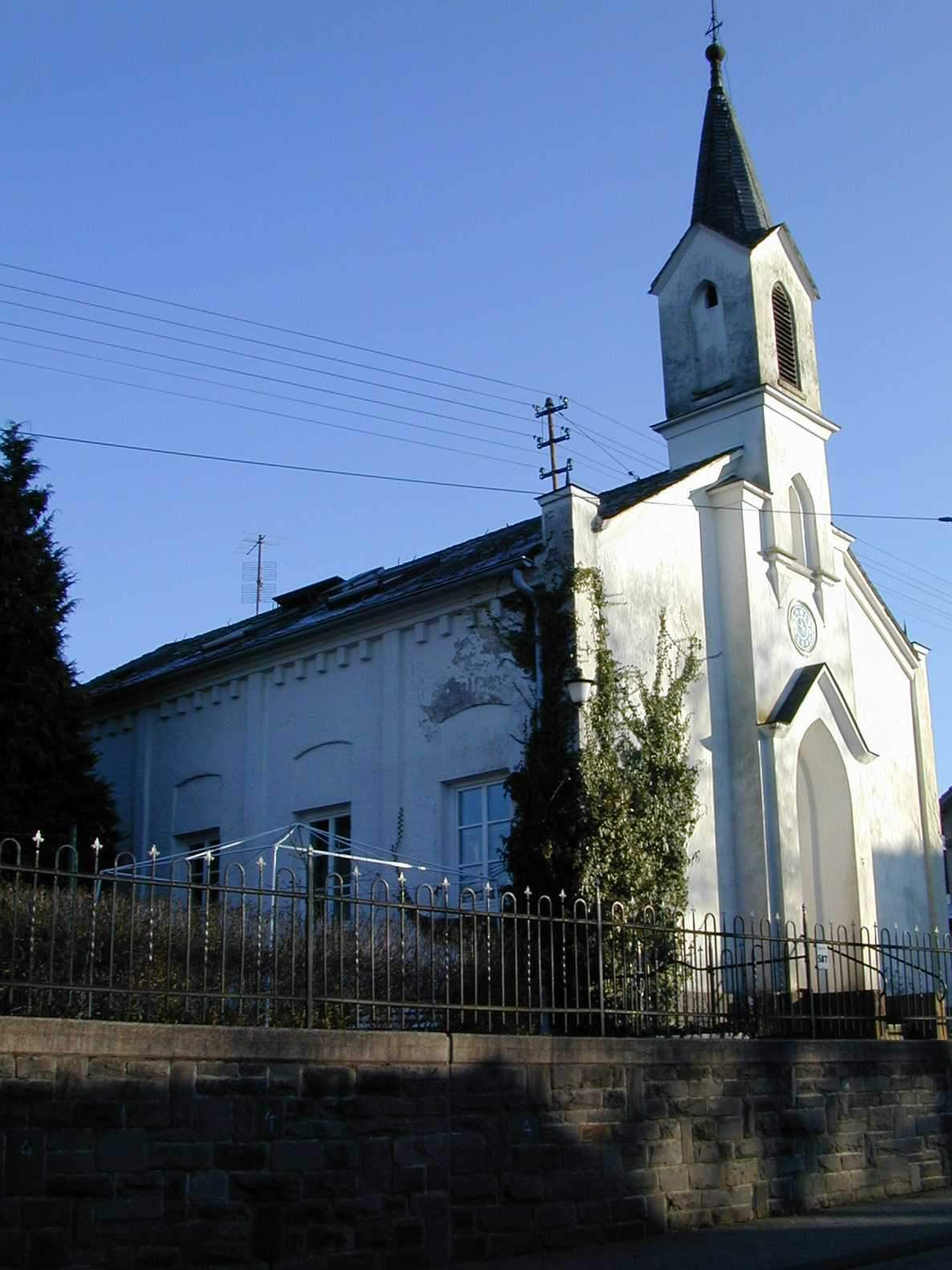
Former chapel school

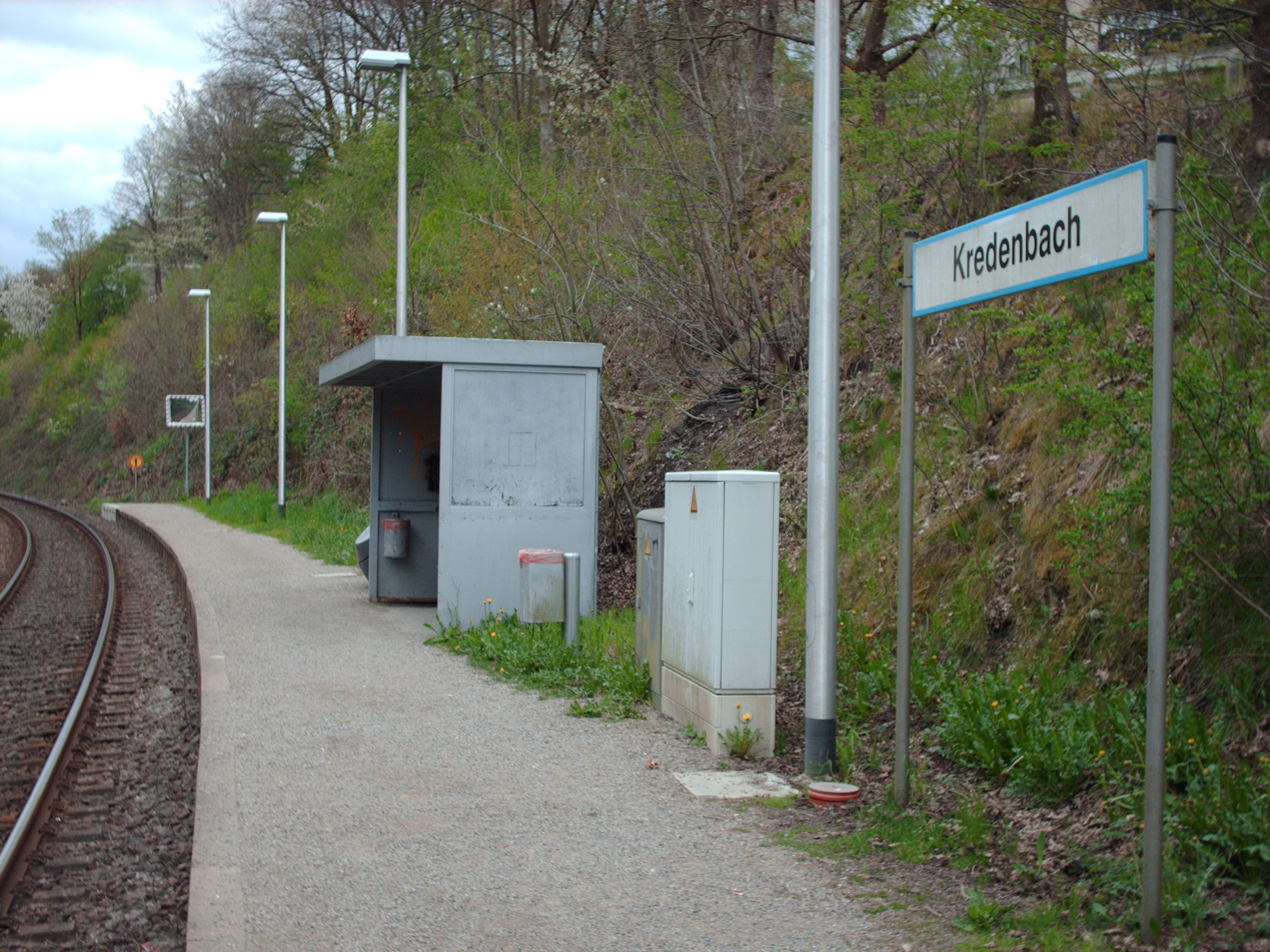
Railway station

Kredenbach is a constituent community of Kreuztal, Siegen-Wittgenstein, North Rhine-Westphalia, Germany.

It has a population of 1709 inhabitants.

== History ==
Kredenbach was created from the two constituent communities Lohe and Kredenbach and the Wüstehof.

Kredenbach and the Wüstehof belonged formally to the Kirchspiel Netphen and from 1623 they belong to Ferndorf. Through municipal reform on 1 January 1969, it was incorporated in Kreuztal. Before that, it belonged to the Amt Ferndorf.

== Radio documentary ==
- Die guten Geister des kleinen Dorfes, Radio documentary from Thilo Schmidt on Deutschlandfunk Kultur – Deutschlandrundfahrt, 2. September 2018, 55 minutes (thiloschmidt.de; MP3; 50,8 MB)
