= Siegerland =

Region of Germany

Coordinates: 50°51′N 7°58′E

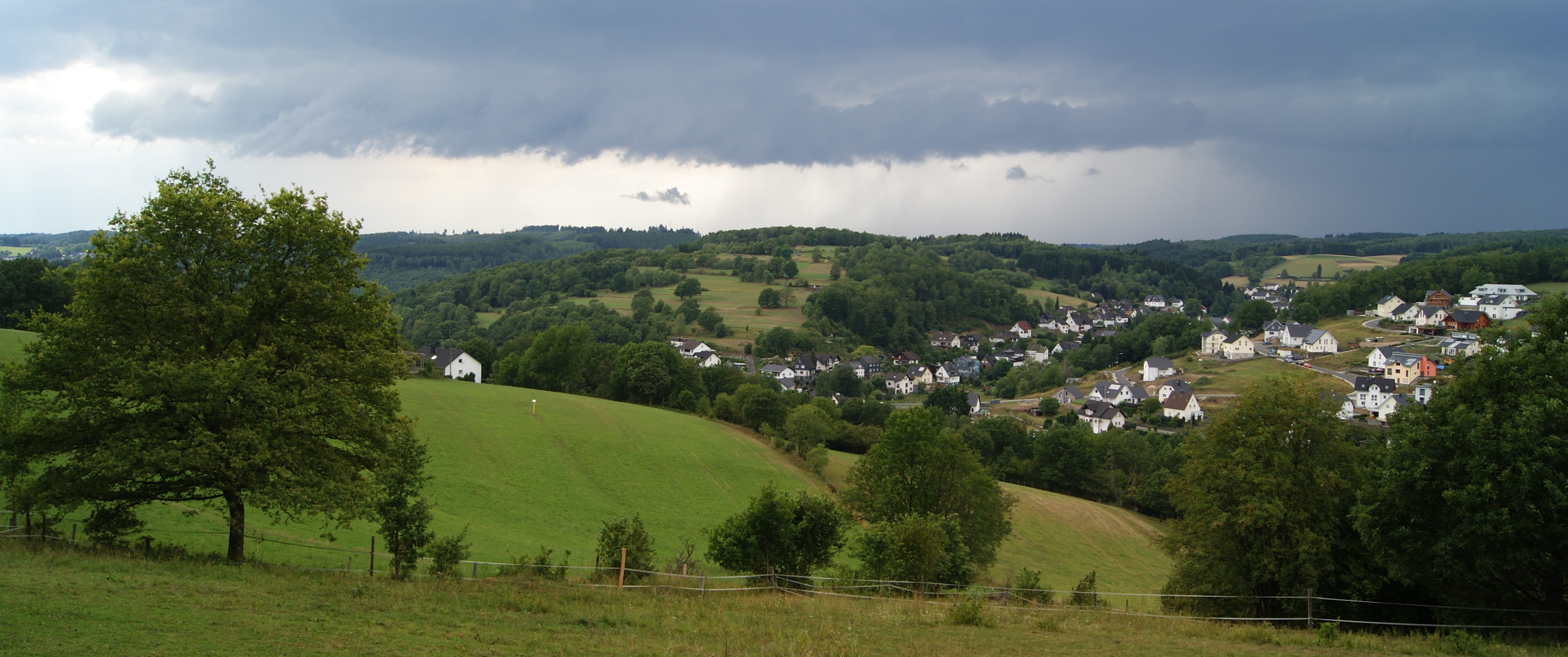
Landscape near Freudenberg (Siegerland)

The Siegerland (German pronunciation: [ˈziːɡɐˌlant]) is a region of Germany covering the old district of Siegen (now part of the district of Siegen-Wittgenstein in North Rhine-Westphalia) and the upper part of the district of Altenkirchen, belonging to the Rhineland-Palatinate adjoining it to the west.

Geologically, the Siegerland belongs to the Rhenish Massif (Rheinisches Schiefergebirge, Rhenish Slate Mountains). The point of highest elevation is the Riemen, at 678 metres above sea level. The river Sieg, a right tributary of the river Rhine, has its source in the town of Netphen in the Rothaar Mountains.

The region around the city of Siegen is centered in the middle of Germany. It includes the municipalities of Hilchenbach, Netphen, Kreuztal, Freudenberg and Siegen, and the communities of Wilnsdorf, Burbach and Neunkirchen, all in North Rhine-Westphalia, and in the Rhineland-Palatinate the municipalities of Kirchen, Herdorf and Betzdorf, with the community of Daaden. The population is approximately 300,000.

The region also has a dialect Siegerländisch which is spoken by many of its inhabitants.
