= Ferndorfbach =

River in Germany

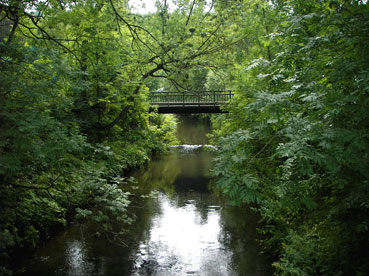

Location
- Country: Germany
- State: North Rhine-Westphalia

Physical characteristics
- Mouth
  - location: Sieg
  - coordinates: 50.8934°N 8.0234°E
- Length: 24.4 km (15.2 mi)

Basin features
- Progression: Sieg→ Rhine→ North Sea
- River system: Rhine

Ferndorfbach (vulgarly known as the Ferndorf) is a river of North Rhine-Westphalia, Germany. It flows through Kreuztal and joins the Sieg in Siegen-Weidenau. Its name relates to the village of Ferndorf, the oldest medieval part of Kreuztal town.

== See also ==
- List of rivers of North Rhine-Westphalia
