= Kreuztal =

- Town
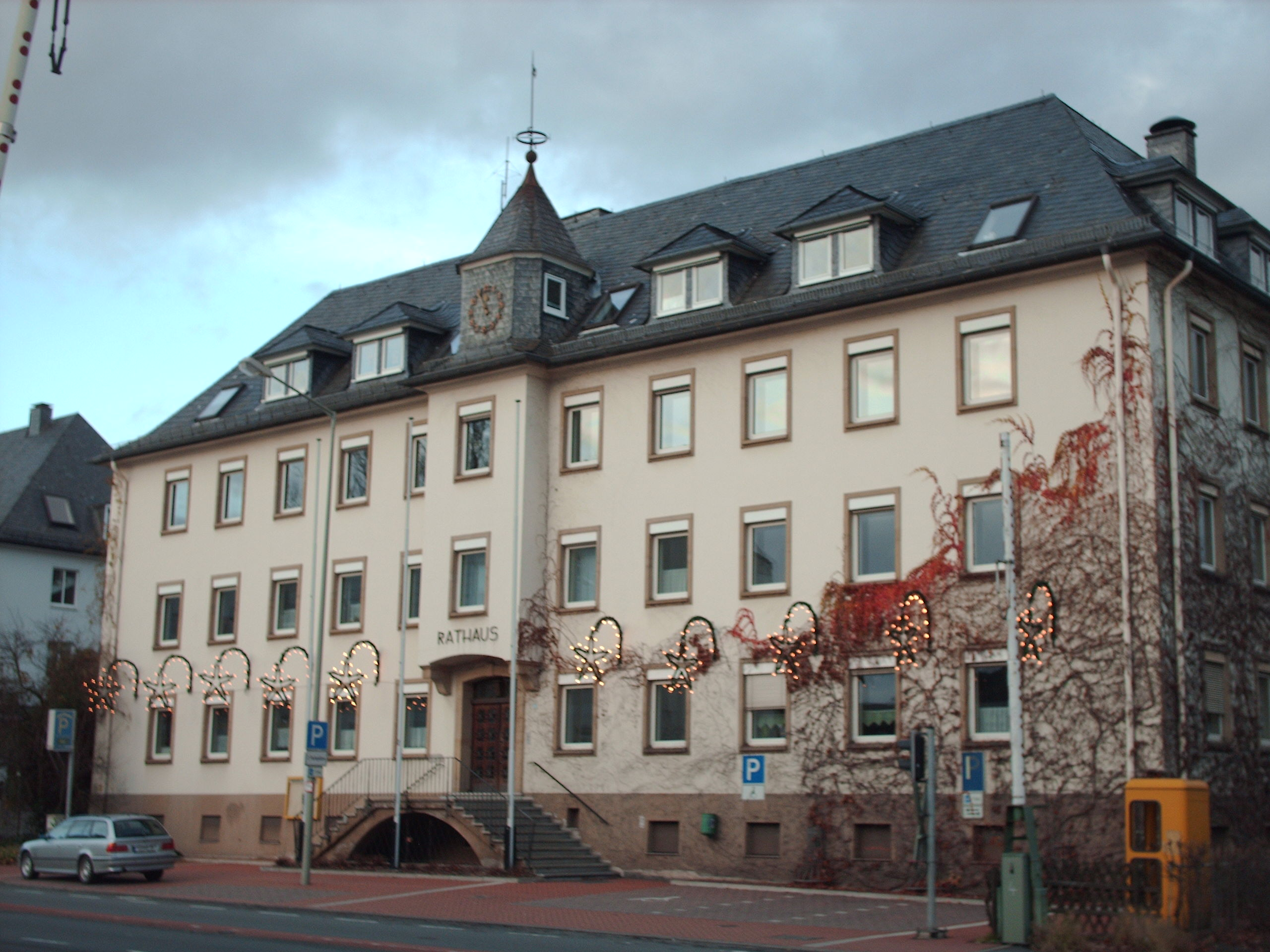
- Town hall

- Flag Coat of arms

- Location of Kreuztal within Siegen-Wittgenstein district
- Interactive map of Kreuztal
- Location within Germany Location within North Rhine-Westphalia
- Coordinates: 50°58′N 7°58′E
- Country: Germany
- State: North Rhine-Westphalia
- Admin. region: Arnsberg
- District: Siegen-Wittgenstein
- Subdivisions: 13

Government
  - Mayor (2020–25): Walter Kiß (SPD)

Area
  - Total: 71.07 km^{2} (27.44 sq mi)
- Elevation: 350 m (1,150 ft)

Population (2025-12-31)
  - Total: 30,721
  - Density: 432.3/km^{2} (1,120/sq mi)
- Time zone: UTC+01:00 (CET)
  - Summer (DST): UTC+02:00 (CEST)
- Postal codes: 57223
- Dialling codes: 02732
- Vehicle registration: SI
- Website: www.kreuztal.de

Kreuztal (German pronunciation: [ˈkʁɔʏtsˌtaːl]) is a town in the Siegen-Wittgenstein district, in North Rhine-Westphalia, Germany.

== Geography ==
=== Location ===
Kreuztal is a town in the low mountains of the northern Siegerland and lies at the western edge of the Rothaargebirge about 10 km north of Siegen.

Across the municipal area from the east flows the Ferndorfbach, swinging to the south in the inner town and leaving the municipal area through the constituent community of Buschhütten.

In the northern municipal area rises the Littfe, which then runs through the constituent communities of Burgholdinghausen, Littfeld, Krombach, Eichen and Fellinghausen before emptying into the Ferndorfbach in the inner town. Further tributary brooks to the Littfe are the Langebach, the Heimkäuser Bach, the Breitenbach, the Krombach, the Stendenbach and the Bockenbach.

In the town's west end rises the Heesbach, which then runs through the constituent communities of Oberhees, Mittelhees, Junkernhees and Fellinghausen, emptying into the Littfe at the footbridge. One tributary to the Hees is the Ostheldener Bach, which feeds the Robertsweier (pond). The Berghäuser Bach, which flows through the Berghäuser Weier (another pond), empties into the Ostheldener Bach downstream from the Robertsweier.

=== Geology ===
The municipal area is part of the Rheinisches Schiefergebirge, or Rhenish Slate Mountains. The southernmost constituent community of Buschhütten gives way to the Sieg gorge to the south. While the bedrock contains many layers of iron-bearing rock, the surface is formed of weathered clayey-sandy earth.

=== Municipal area's extent ===
The municipal area covers 70.96 km^{2}. This breaks down as:

- 60.02% wooded
- 16.41% agricultural
- 14.49% buildings and yards
- 7.09% transport
- 2.26% other

The town's highest point is the Hoher Wald at 655 m above mean sea level, and its lowest point is to be found in Buschhütten where the Ferndorfbach leaves the municipal area at a height of 260 m above sea level. The municipal area's north-south extent is 12 km, and its east-west extent is 11 km.

=== Neighbouring communities ===
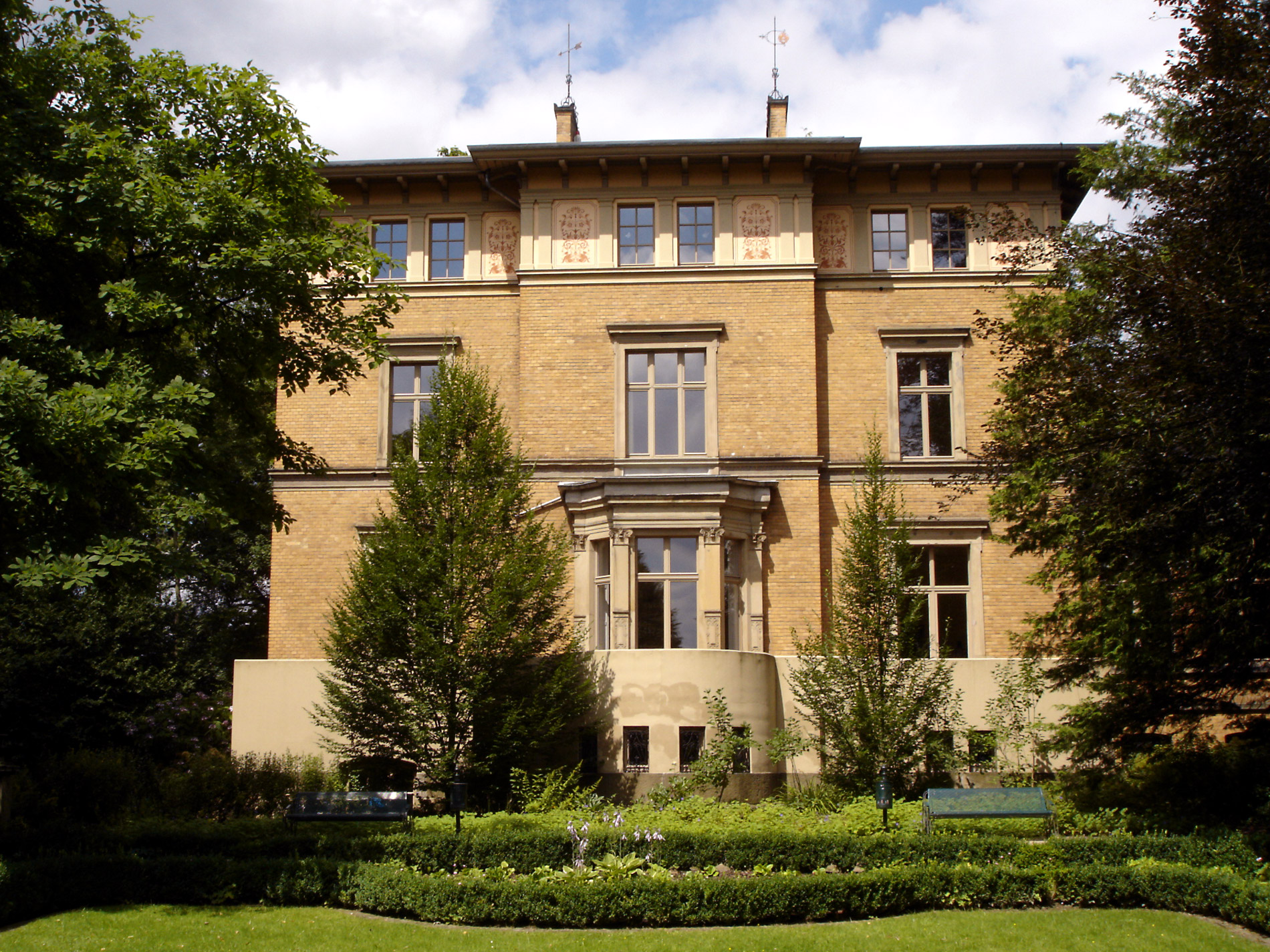
Gelbe Villa in Dreslers Park

The town, lying in the northwestern part of the district, borders in the south on Siegen, in the west on Freudenberg and Wenden, in the north on Kirchhundem and Olpe and in the east on Hilchenbach and Netphen. The town is shaped by the valleys of the Ferndorfbach, Littfe and Hees, which together form a cross-shaped valley.

The town's highest elevation is the mountain Hoher Wald at 655 m above sea level. The peak is however not open to the public, as it belongs to the Bundeswehr. Other mountains are the Hölzenberg 626 m above sea level, Kindelsberg 617.9 m above sea level (the town's landmark), the Martinshardt 616.1 m above sea level, the Ziegenberg 521 m above sea level, the Wilder Stein 478.9 m above sea level, die Rodenull 436 m above sea level, the Köpfchen 407.4 m above sea level, the Pfaffenberg 398.7 m above sea level, the Buberg, the Pühlsberg, the Krähenberg, the Altenhahn, the Löherhauberg, the Höhberg, the Rohberg, the Wolfshagen, the Mühlberg, the Mühlenkopf, the Kilgeshahn, the Siegerberg, the Kohlenberg, the Hohler Stein, the Dudeltätsch and the Heidlofsberg.

=== Constituent communities ===
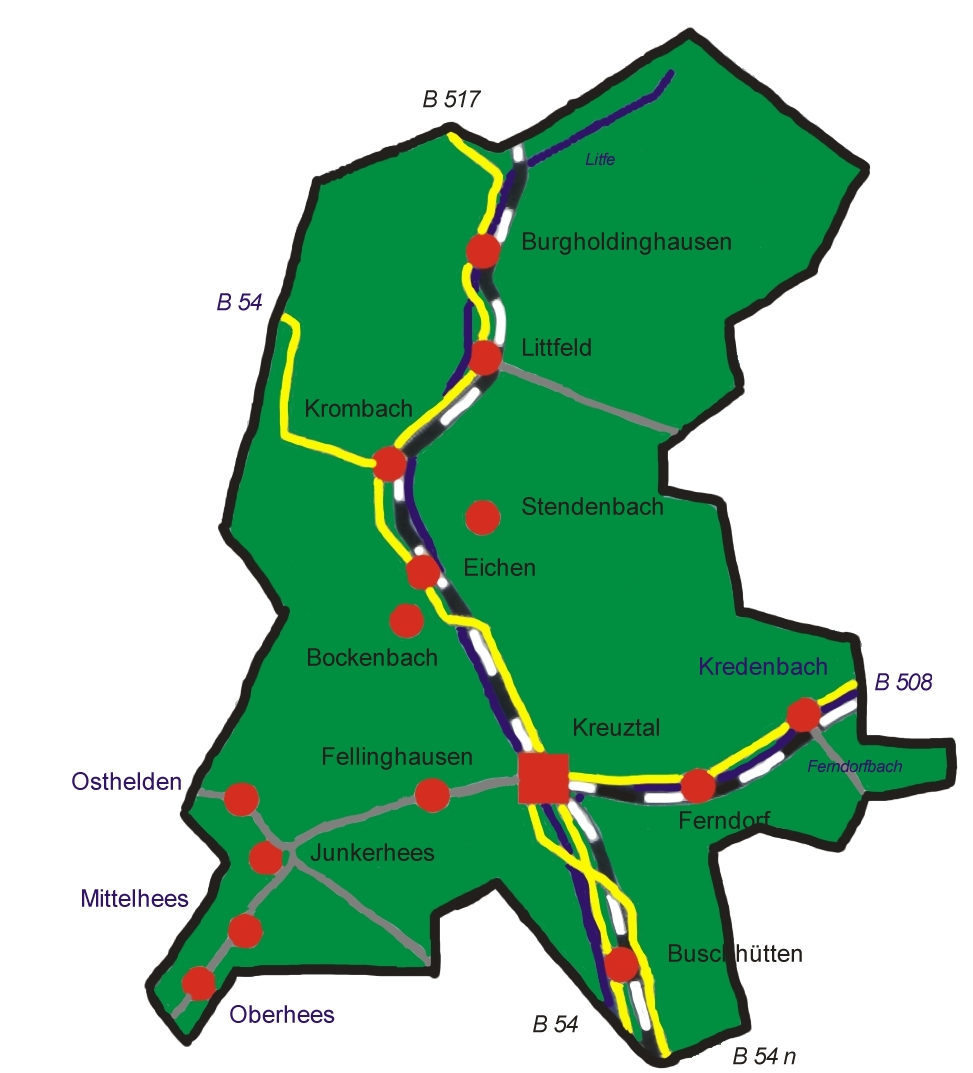
Constituent communities

The town is made up of the centres of Burgholdinghausen, Krombach and Eichen in the north, Kreuztal in the middle, Osthelden, Oberhees, Mittelhees, Junkernhees and Fellinghausen in the west, and Ferndorf, Kredenbach, Langenau and Buschhütten in the south.

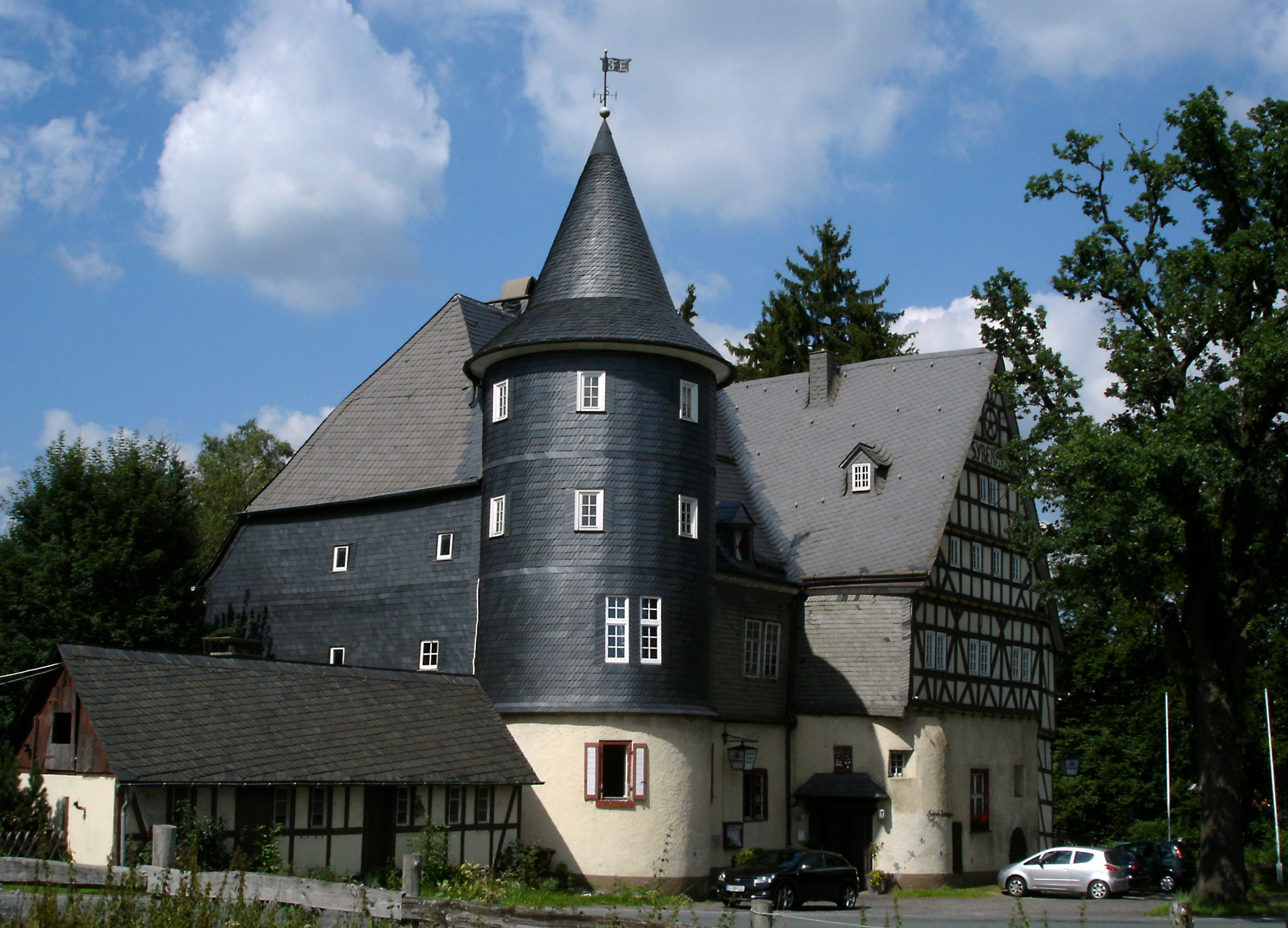
Schloss Junkernhees

== History ==
The town of Kreuztal as it stands now is the child of the municipal reform of 1 January 1969. It came into being through the voluntary merger of the communities of Burgholdinghausen, Buschhütten, Eichen, Fellinghausen, Ferndorf, Kredenbach, Kreuztal, Krombach, Littfeld, Mittelhees, Oberhees and Osthelden.

The first documentary mentions go back to 1067, among which are found a place called "Berentraph", the later constituent community of Ferndorf, one of the earliest named places in the Siegerland. Until the town was founded, Ferndorf was the old Amt's namesake.

The constituent community of Ernsdorf was first mentioned in a document as "Erinstorff" in 1417-19. During the time of the Confederation of the Rhine, Ernsdorf was the local mayor's seat.

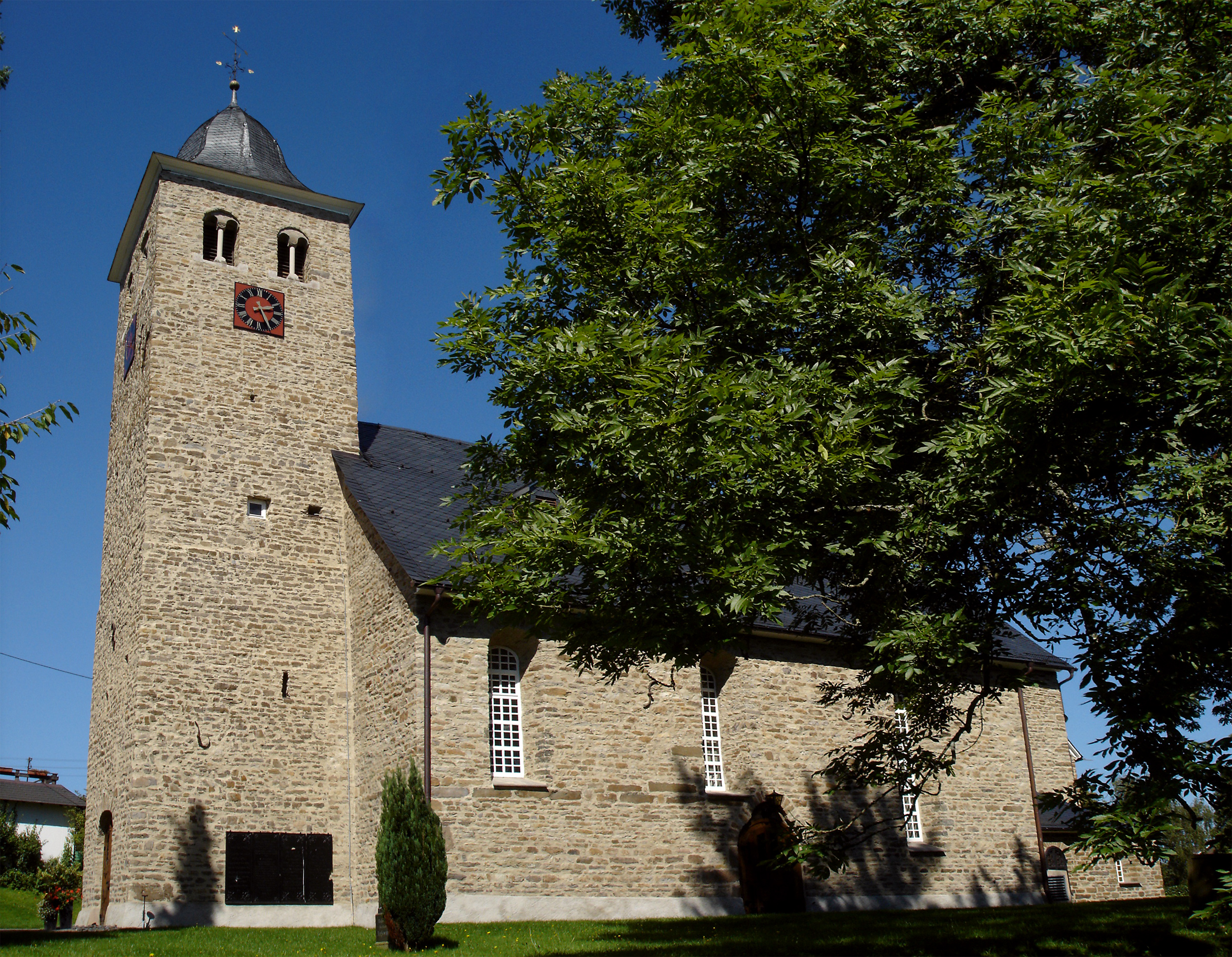
Krombach Protestant Church

The name that the town now bears first cropped up in 1826 in the baptismal register of the community of Ferndorf.

Development in the town was sparked by the railway. In 1861, the Ruhr-Sieg line opened, leading Kreuztal to become a railway hub by 1880. Up to 1888, a spur to Erndtebrück, Bad Laasphe and Marburg was built. Also in the plans was a line to Olpe and Meinerzhagen, but this was only partly finished, as far as Krummenerl.

=== Religion ===
(as of 30 December 2003)

- 59.43% Protestant
- 17.99% Catholic
- 22.58% other

== Population ==
Historical population

Year	Pop.	±% p.a.
1965	27,031	—
1970	28,952	+1.38%
1975	30,470	+1.03%
1980	30,212	−0.17%
1985	29,009	−0.81%
1990	30,885	+1.26%
1995	32,243	+0.86%

Year	Pop.	±% p.a.
2000	32,099	−0.09%
2005	31,939	−0.10%
2010	30,995	−0.60%
2015	31,500	+0.32%
2020	30,965	−0.34%
2025	30,721	−0.16%

Source: Landesdatabank Nordrhein-Westfalen

== Politics ==
=== Town council ===
The town council's 38 seats are apportioned thus, in accordance with municipal elections held on 26 September 2004:

	CDU	SPD	Greens	FDP	FW	BGK	total
2004	16	14	3	2	2	1	38

Note: FW and BGK are citizens' coalitions.

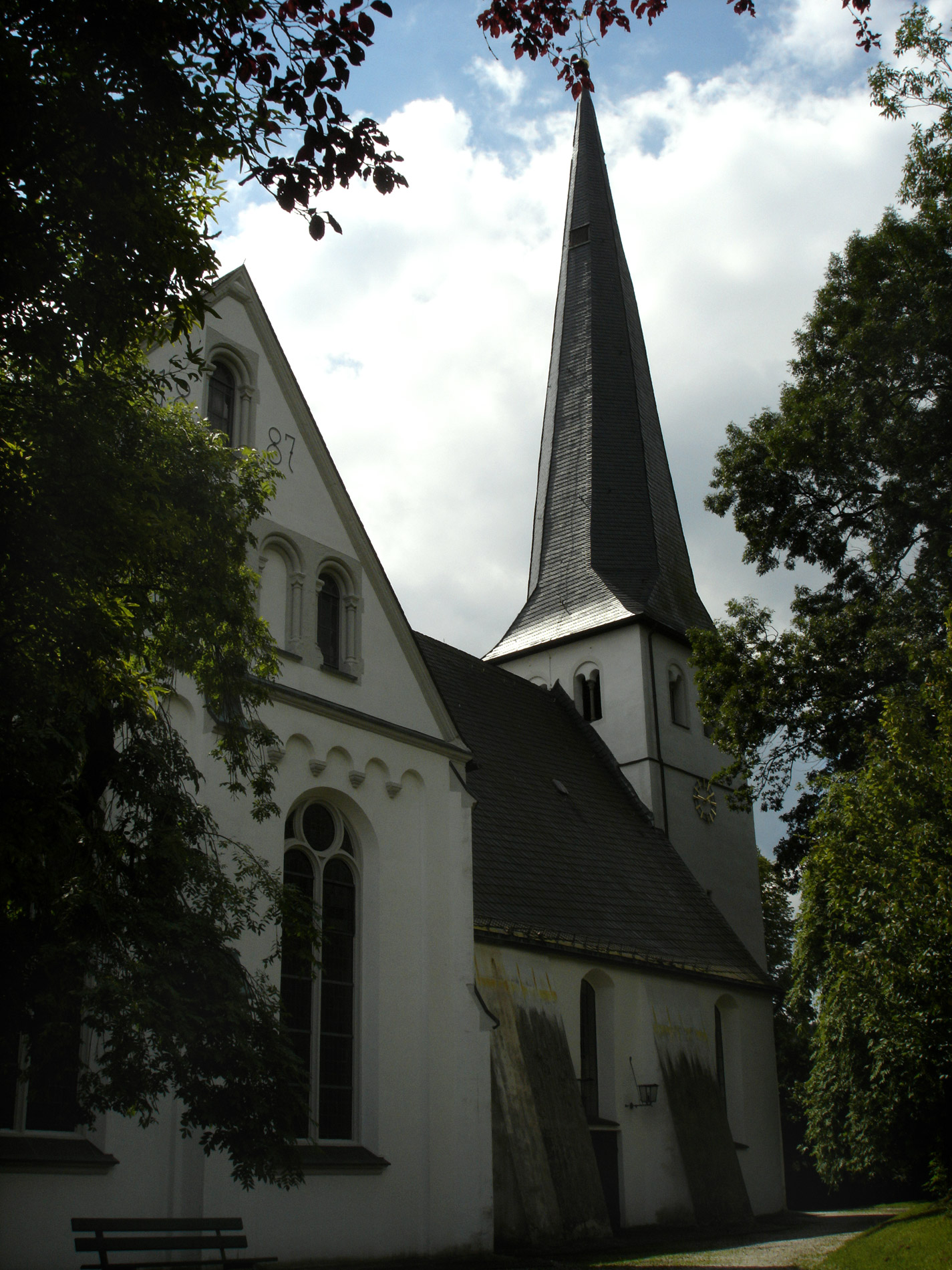
Ferndorf Protestant Church

=== Coat of arms ===
Kreuztal's civic coat of arms might heraldically be described thus: Party per fess, above, in Or a horn azure, below, in azure a saltire Or.

The horn charge is Ferndorf's old arms, and is also the emblem of the princely house of Nassau-Orange, and thereby also a reference to the town's past. The saltire is a reference to the local geography, as the valleys form a cross shape, and it is a canting symbol, too, since "Kreuztal" literally means "Crossdale" in German (that name does, of course, refer to the geography). Gold and blue are Nassau's colours.

== Culture and sightseeing ==
=== Theatre ===
At the Stadthalle, lying in the school centre, there are regular theatrical productions.

=== Museums ===
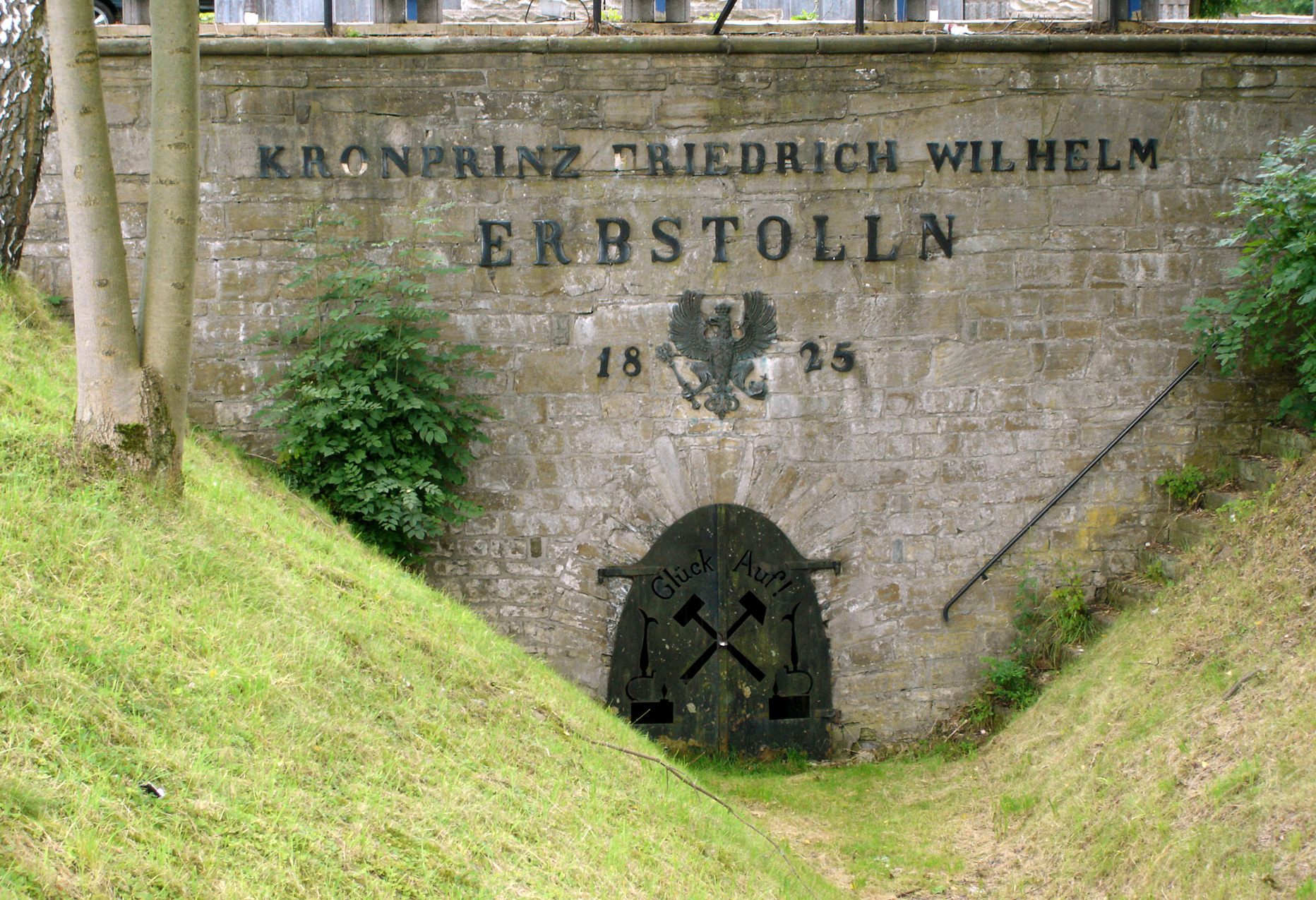
Crown Prince Friedrich Wilhelm gallery

In Ferndorf is the local history museum (Heimatmuseum). On show here in about 200 m^{2} are finds from prehistory and early history, as well as handicrafts and exhibits about home décor in the 17th and 18th centuries.

=== Buildings ===
==== Kindelsbergturm ====
On the Kindelsberg, the town's second highest peak at 618 m, stands the 22 m-high Kindelsbergturm (tower). It was built in 1907 by the Sauerländischer Gebirgsverein (Sauerland Mountain Club, or SGV) and has had further remodelling in the course of its history. From the top is a view over the municipal area, and in good weather, the viewer can even see into the Siebengebirge near Bonn.

==== Schloss Junkernhees ====
The stately home of Junkernhees was originally built in 1523 by a Sir Adam (der Ritter Adam) with a moat around it. In 1698, it was expanded by being given a half-timbered gable. Two outbuildings, the former brandy distillery and the old mill from 1796, are also preserved.

==== Ferndorf Protestant Church ====
This was built in the first half of the 13th century as Saint Lawrence's. It consists of a late Romanesque hall church with a western tower and a three-halled nave with a tower built before it.

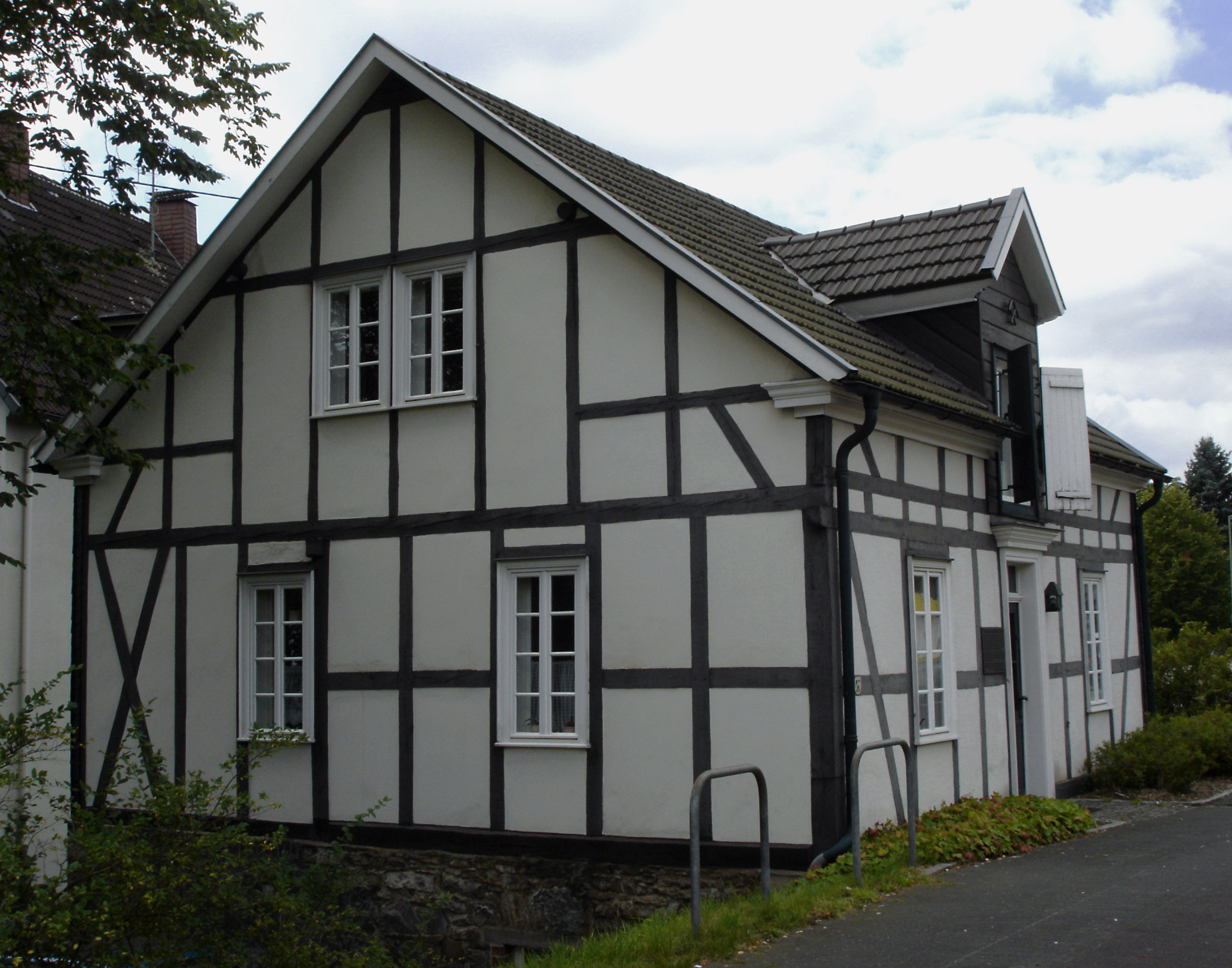
Crown Prince Friedrich Wilhelm gallery house

==== Krombach Protestant Reformed Church ====
Built in 1250, the main choir is one hall, and the nave two and a half. The pulpit was made in 1764 and the altar table in 1781. The tower that stands today was built in 1706, after the earlier tower was destroyed by a lightning strike.

==== Dreslers Park ====
These buildings, built between 1860 and 1880, nowadays house the citizen and culture centre with the town archive. The park was named after the manufacturing family Dresler, who once owned the park. In the park are found the "yellow villa", the "white villa", the wagon shed, the coachhouse (today a restaurant and inn), the music pavilion and the garden house. The wagon shed houses a daycare centre.

==== Altenberg ====
At the Altenberg between the constituent community of Littfeld and Hilchenbach-Müsen are found the remains of a settlement from the 13th century. A hiking trail leads through this former mining settlement. Archaeological finds are on display at the mining museum in Hilchenbach-Müsen.

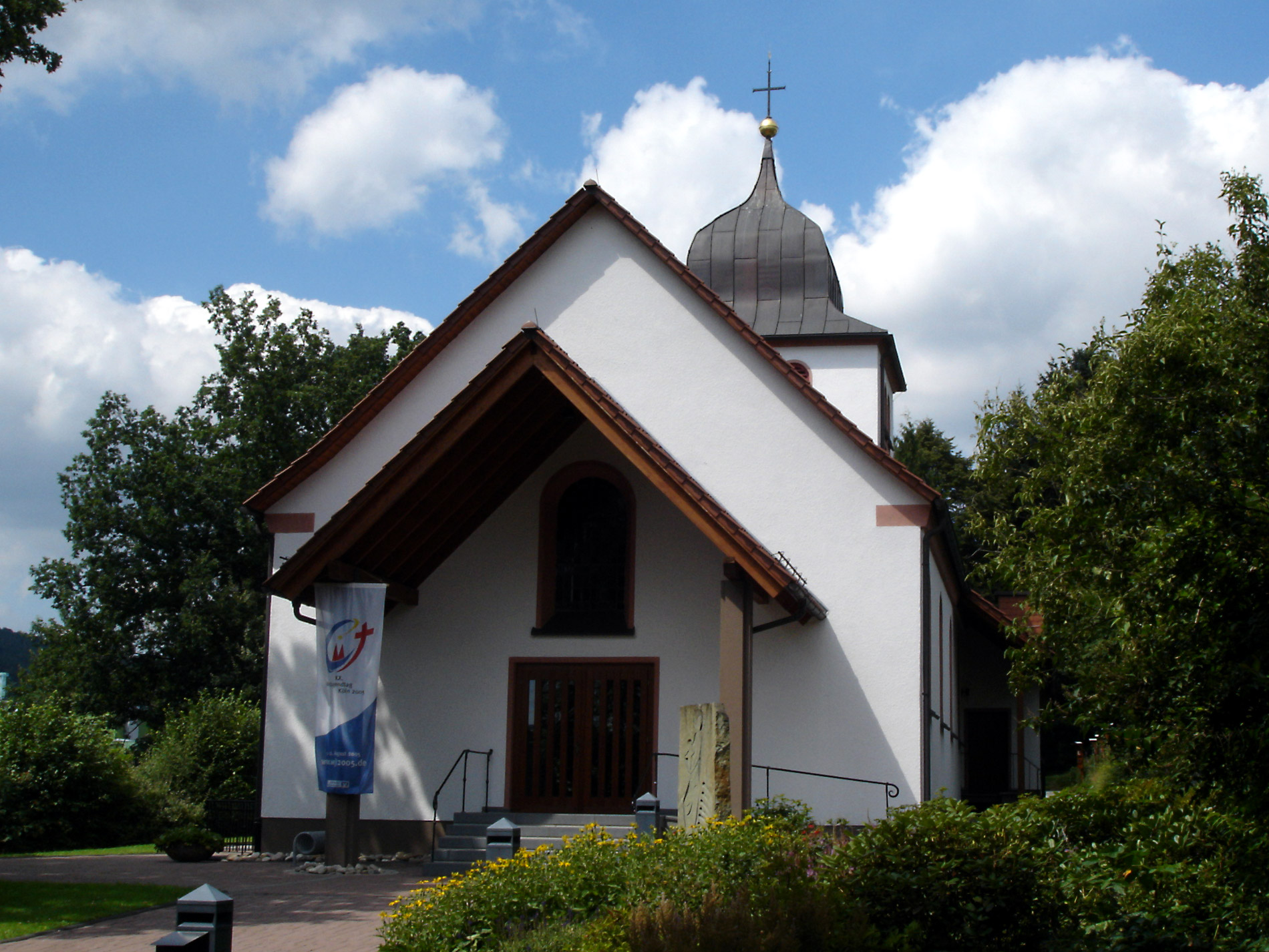
St. Ludger's and St. Hedwig's Church, Krombach

==== "Ewiger Fuhrmann" wind generator ====
The "Ewiger Fuhrmann" – Everlasting Wagoner – is at 150 m one of the world's tallest wind generators, and indeed was the tallest when it was built. The rotor is about 66 m wide. The tower itself is a steel lattice and weighs roughly 145 t. The power house alone weighs 63 t all together. Yearly, it generates about 3 gWh.

==== Kaiser Wilhelm Gallery ====
In the heart of the town is the former entry area to the Kaiser Wilhelm Gallery (an underground gallery) with its Stollenhaus ("Gallery House"), which now houses the town administration's office for schools, kindergartens and sport.

==== Gasthof Hambloch ====
The Hamblock Inn lies in the constituent community of Krombach and can look back on 500 years of tradition. Even today, the hitching posts bear witness to the long-distance trade of yore from Frankfurt to Soest and from Wipperfürth to the Netherlands.

=== Sport ===
Kreuztal has a well grown and diverse sporting club life. Multiple types of sport is offered by the many clubs:

1. FC Littfeld 1982 e.V.; ADAC Ortsclub Siegerland Nord e.V.; Angelsportclub "Früh Auf" Kreuztal e.V. Zum Stipp; Angelsportverein "Petri Heil" Kreuztal; Automobil- und Yachtclub Siegerland; Basketballclub Cross-Valley Mavericks 85 e.V.; Bogen-Sport.Club Kreuztal e.V (archery); BSG Krombacher Brauerei; BSG Stadt Kreuztal; BSW-Wandergruppe Kreuztal e.V. (hiking); CVJM Fellinghausen (YMCA); Deutscher Soldatenbund "Kyffhäuser" Kameradschaft Fellinghausen e.V. (soldiers' club/"legion"); DLRG e.V. - Ortsgruppe Kreuztal; Fan-Club Schalke 04 Siegerland Nord e.V.; FC Ernsdorf e.V.; FC Kreuztal 08 e.V.; Fischereigemeinschaft "Früh-Auf" Eichen e.V.; Freizeitsportclub Eichen; Golfclub Siegerland e.V.; Kenko Karate Kreuztal; Kreuztal Tanzclub Casino (KTC) e.V. (dancing); Kyffhäuser Kameradschaft Fellinghausen; Kyffhäuser- und Schützenkameradschaft Kreuztal 1871 e.V. (shooting); Kyffhäuser-, Schützen- u. Bogensportverein Krombach 1894 e.V. (shooting and archery); Leichtathletikgemeinschaft (LG) Kindelsberg Kreuztal e.V. (athletics); Luftsportverein Ferndorf e.V. (windsport); Modellsportclub Littfetal e.V.; Motorsportclub "Kindelsberg" e.V.; MSV Kreuztal e.V.; Orientierungslaufgemeinschaft Siegerland (orienteering); Radsportclub Krombach 88 e.V (cycling); Radsportverein Osthelden e.V. (cycling)	Rehasportverein Ferndorf 1958 e.V. (rehab sports); Reit- und Fahrverein Kindelsberg e.V. (riding); RSC Krombach 88 e.V. - Radsportclub Krombach (cycling); Schachverein Kreuztal-Buschhütten (chess); Schützenverein Eichen e.V. 1952 (shooting); Schützenverein Littfeld e.V. (shooting); Schützenverein "Hubertus" e.V. Ferndorf (shooting); SCI "Juventus" Kreuztal; Segelgemeinschaft Kreuztal e.V. (sailing); Sportfreunde Eichen-Krombach e.V.; Skigilde Ferndorf im SGV (skiing); Spielvereinigung Kredenbach-Müsen e.V.; Sportfischereiclub Kindelsberg e.V. (fishing); Sportfischereiverein Littfetal e.V. (fishing); Stadtsportverband Kreuztal; SV Langenau 08 e.V.; TC Buschhütten (tennis); Tennisclub Krombach e.V.; TFV Kreuztal; Turn- und Spielverein Ferndorf 1888 e.V.; Turniergemeinschaft Eichener Sonnenhang; Turnverein "Germania" 1885 e.V. Buschhütten (gymnastics); Turnverein "Hoffnung" Littfeld e.V. (gymnastics); Turnverein Eichen von 1888 e.V. (gymnastics); Turnverein Kredenbach-Lohe 1887 e.V. (gymnastics); Turnverein Kreuztal 1888 e.V. (gymnastics); Turnverein Krombach 1960 e.V. (gymnastics); TuS Fellinghausen e.V. von 1920; Wurftaubenclub Siegerland e.V.; Yang Shi Taiji Association e.V. Germany; Zucht-, Reit- und Fahrverein Ferndorfer Mühle e.V.

=== Regular sporting events ===
The TV Germania Buschhütten 1885 holds its triathlon on the second Sunday in May, an event regarded as one of Germany's most important triathlons.

== Economy and infrastructure ==
=== Transport ===
The municipal area is crossed from north to south by Federal Highway (Bundesstraße) B 54. Towards the south, running parallel to this road is also the B 54n, known as the Hüttentalstraße (HTS) and built as a Stadtautobahn (an Autobahn running through a built-up area). It connects the town with Autobahn A 45 to the south. Sometime in 2006, the B 54n is to be extended to Krombach in the north of the municipal area, where it will one day connect to the A 4, which is likewise under construction.

Eastwards run Federal Highways B 508 towards Hilchenbach and B 517 towards Kirchhundem and Lennestadt.

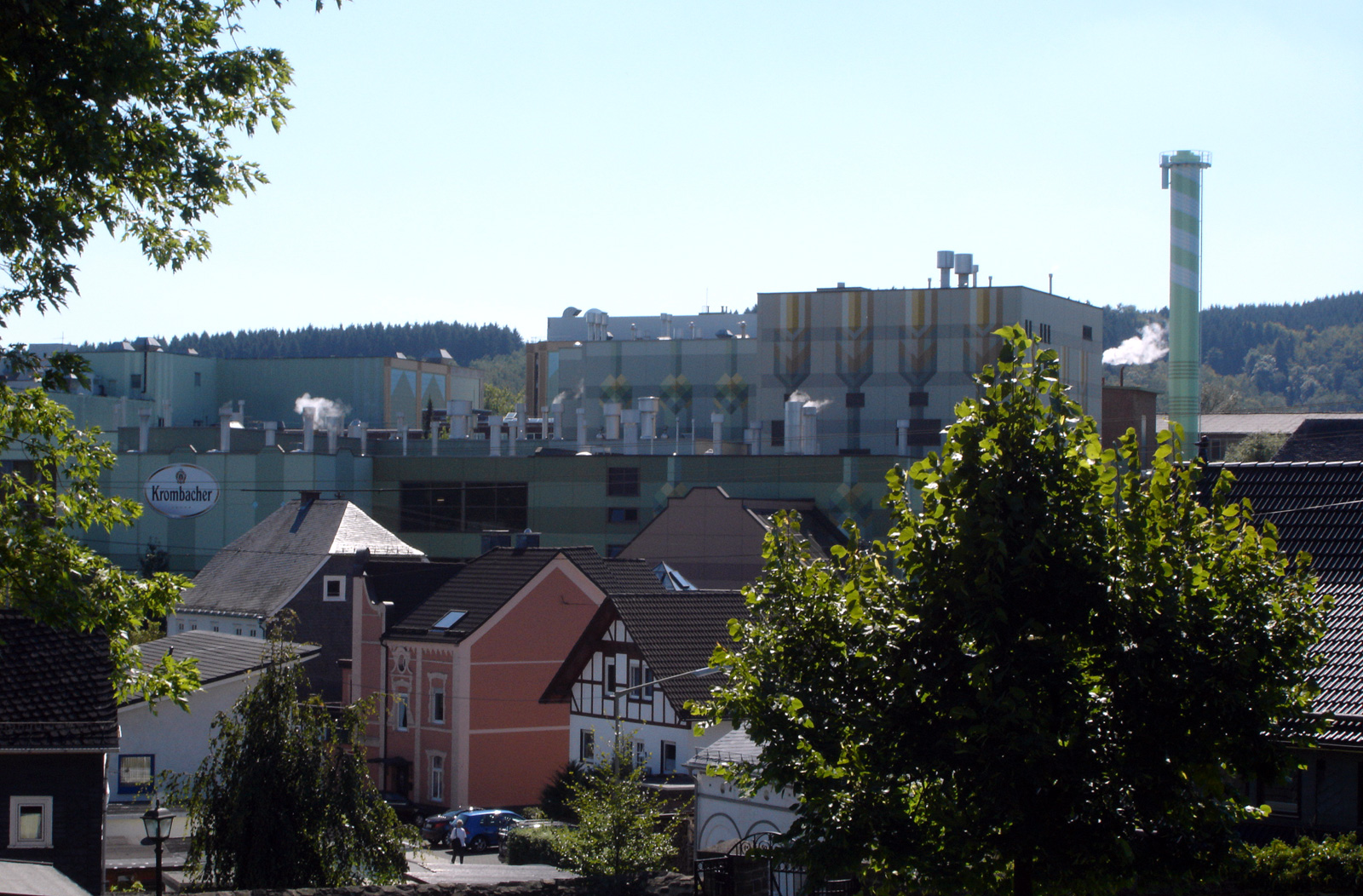
Krombach Brewery

Parallel to the highways run the railways. From north to south runs the Ruhr-Sieg line, and east-west runs the Rothaar Railway (RB93) of Hessische Landesbahn, section DreiLänderBahn, through the Wittgensteiner Land towards Marburg. Within the municipal area are six railway stations or halts (as of 2003). The central station lies in Kreuztal (main town). Halts are to be found in Littfeld, Eichen, Ferndorf and Kredenbach. Although it serves Dahlbruch, a constituent community of Hilchenbach, this station is nonetheless within Kreuztal's municipal area. Kreuztal also has South Westphalia's only marshalling yard, and connected thereto is the region's only railway container terminal. This is found in Langenau, and beyond its national functions, it also serves regional goods transport in the Sauerland and Siegerland. To and from the Kreuztal Marshalling Yard, trains run, by way of the national marshalling yard in Hagen-Vorhalle, to all destinations that can be reached by rail.

The town is connected by many regional buslines with surrounding towns. Since 1998, South Westphalia's first private bus service (Bürgerbus) has been running. On regional trains and buses, the tariff is that used by the South Westphalia Transport Community (Verkehrsgemeinschaft Westfalen-Süd) and the fare association Westfalen-Tarif.

Kreuztal can also be reached through the Siegerland Airport in the south of the district.

=== Education ===
- At Dreslers Park is the Kreuztal-Hilchenbach Music School, which is run by, among others, the town's cultural office.
- At the Kreuztal School Centre are the Städtisches Gymnasium (previous named Friedrich Flick Gymnasium), the Ernst Moritz Arndt-Realschule and the Clara Schumann comprehensive school.

== Twin towns – sister cities ==
Kreuztal is twinned with:

- Ferndorf, Austria
- Nauen, Germany

== Notable people ==
- Friedrich Flick (1883–1972), industrialist and convicted war criminal
- Boris Hoppek (born 1970), contemporary artist based in Barcelona

=== Honorary citizens ===
- Friedrich Flick
