= Dietzenbach-Steinberg station =

Railway station in Germany

Dietzenbach Steinberg
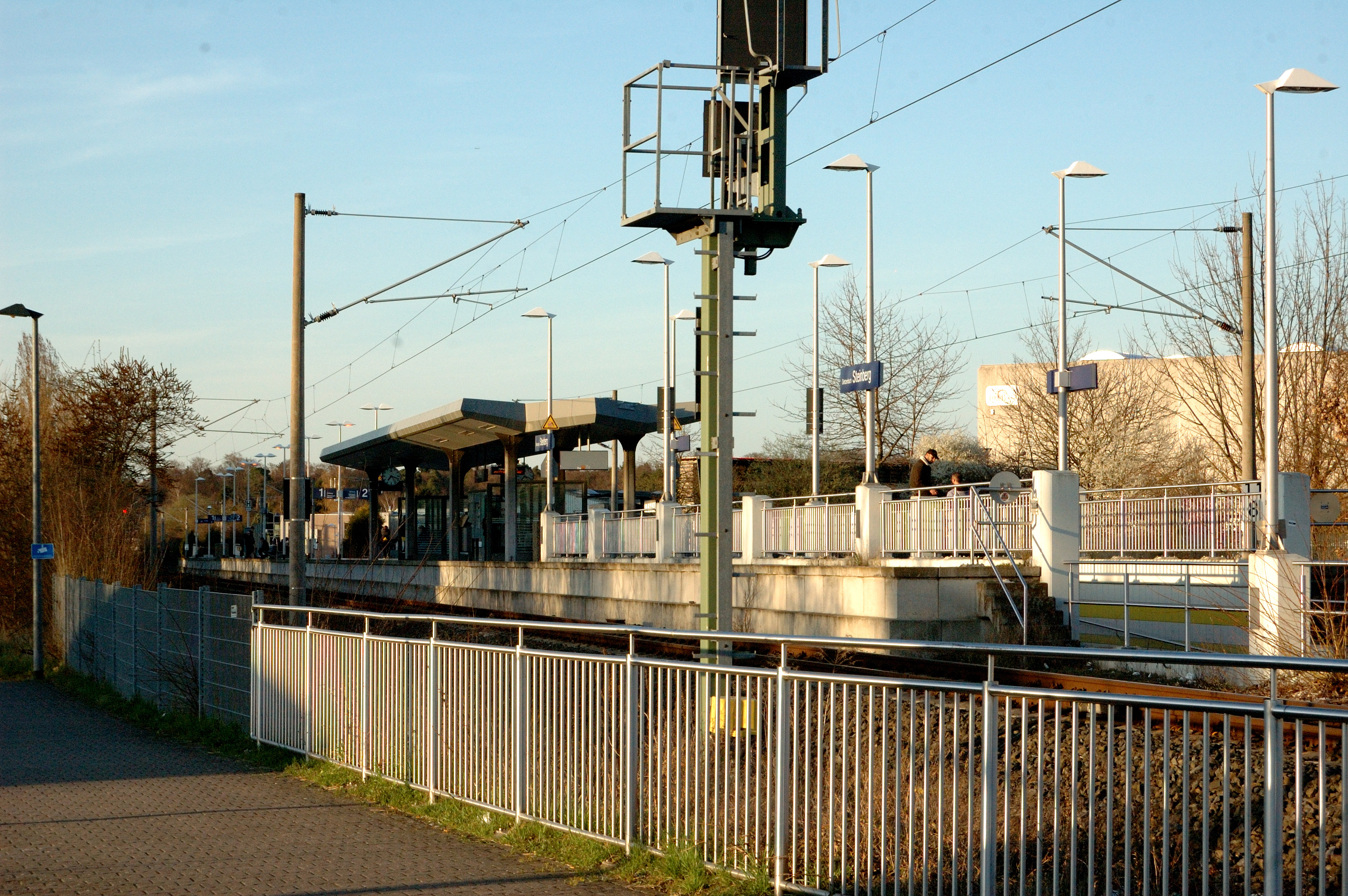

General information
- Location: Römerstr. 12, Steinberg, Dietzenbach, Hesse; Germany
- Coordinates: 50°01′33″N 8°47′34″E
- Line: Offenbach-Bieber–Dietzenbach (km 11.5)
- Platforms: 2

Construction
- Accessible: Yes

Other information
- Station code: 7216
- DS100 code: FDZS
- IBNR: 8001459
- Category: 5
- Fare zone: : 3550
- Website: www.bahnhof.de

History
- Opened: 1 December 1898

Services
Preceding station	Rhine-Main S-Bahn	Following station
Heusenstamm towards Niedernhausen	S2 (Rhine-Main S-Bahn)	Dietzenbach-Mitte towards Dietzenbach
Location
- Location within Hesse

Dietzenbach-Steinberg station is a station in the Dietzenbach district of Steinberg in the German state of Hesse. It is served by line S2 of the Rhine-Main S-Bahn.

== History ==
Steinberg station was opened on 1 December 1898 as a single-track Haltepunkt (halt) along with the Offenbach-Bieber–Dietzenbach railway, a line that branches off the Rodgau Railway (Rodgaubahn) in Offenbach-Bieber. Trains ran on this line between Dietzenbach (Hess) station and Offenbach Hauptbahnhof. Passenger services on the line were discontinued on 18 June 1982, because traffic on it had been significantly affected by increasing car ownership. The line was then used only for a small amount of freight traffic and the rail passenger services were replaced by buses. Services on line S2 of the Rhine-Main S-Bahn commenced at the 2003/2004 timetable change on 14 December 2003.

In the course of the development of the line for the S-Bahn, the track layout at the station was altered and the line was double-tracked and electrified. The station received an island platform for S-Bahn operations from 2001 to 2003 and the entrances were rebuilt to be barrier-free for the disabled.

== Infrastructure ==
The station has 2 platforms tracks around an island platform. The tracks towards Dietzenbach station and towards Offenbach run at ground level. There is a set of points on the track towards Offenbach that connects to a siding that until the autumn of 2008 was still regularly used by so-called "Banana Express" to supply a local vegetable wholesaler. The track is still there, but it is closed to traffic.

== Operations ==
Today, the station is served exclusively by services on S-Bahn line S2. These run to Niedernhausen via Heusenstamm, Offenbach, Frankfurt and Hofheim. In the opposite direction, the S2 runs to Dietzenbach station.

The S-Bahn trains run on a basic cycle of 30 minutes. During the peak, services run every 15 minutes.

=== Bus services ===
Dietzenbach-Steinberg station is served by Dietzenbach municipal bus routes OF-56 and OF-57.
