= Dietzenbach-Mitte station =

Railway station in Germany

Dietzenbach Mitte
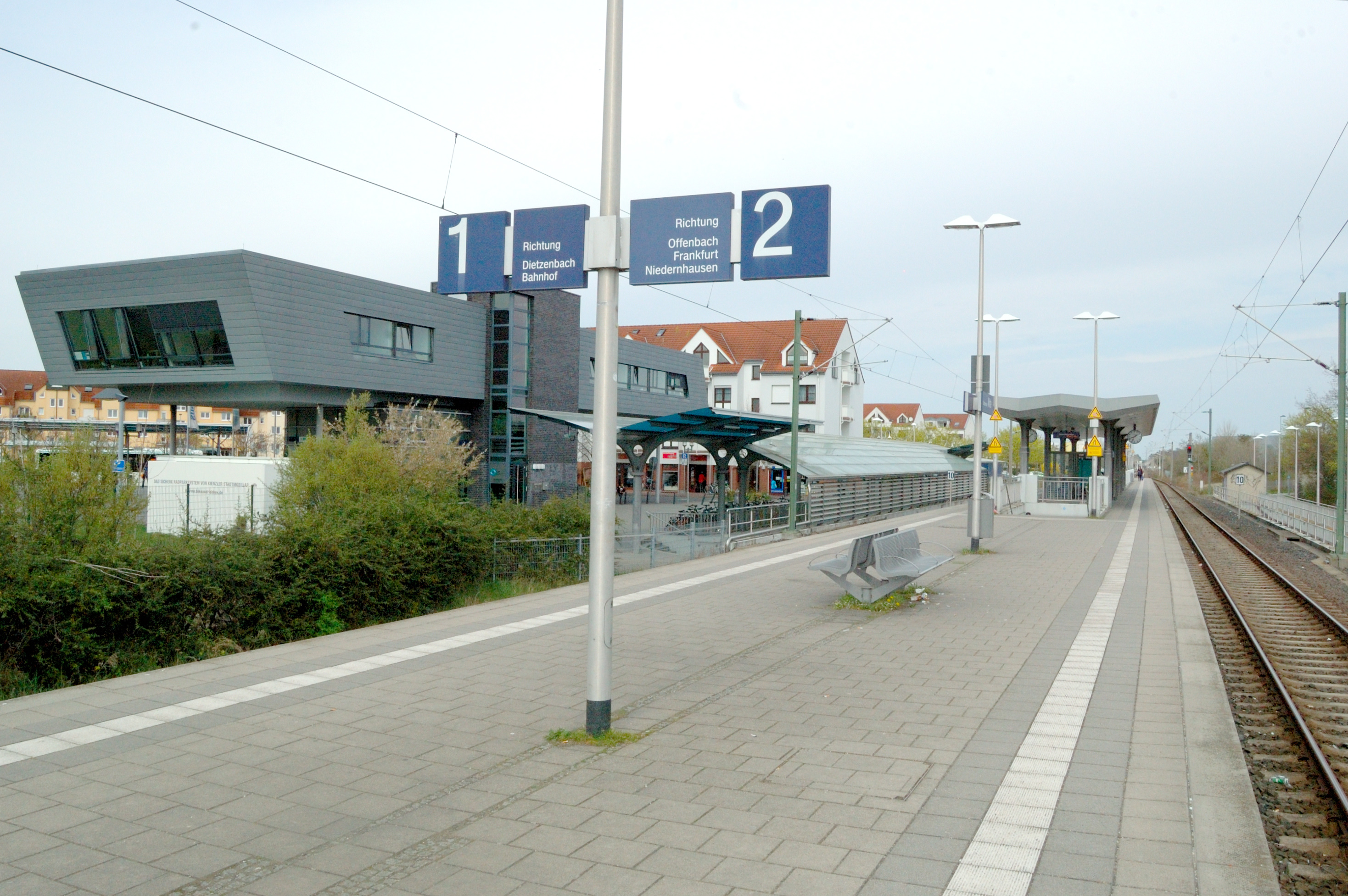
- Platform

General information
- Location: Masayaplatz 1, Dietzenbach, Hesse; Germany
- Coordinates: 50°01′04″N 8°47′21″E
- Line: Offenbach-Bieber–Dietzenbach (km 12.7)
- Platforms: 2

Construction
- Accessible: Yes

Other information
- Station code: 7213
- DS100 code: FDZM
- IBNR: 8001455
- Category: 4
- Fare zone: : 3550
- Website: www.bahnhof.de

History
- Opened: 14 December 2003

Services
Preceding station	Rhine-Main S-Bahn	Following station
Dietzenbach-Steinberg towards Niedernhausen	S2 (Rhine-Main S-Bahn)	Dietzenbach Terminus
Location
- Location within Hesse

Dietzenbach-Mitte station is a station in Dietzenbach in the German state of Hesse. It is served by line S2 of the Rhine-Main S-Bahn.

== History ==
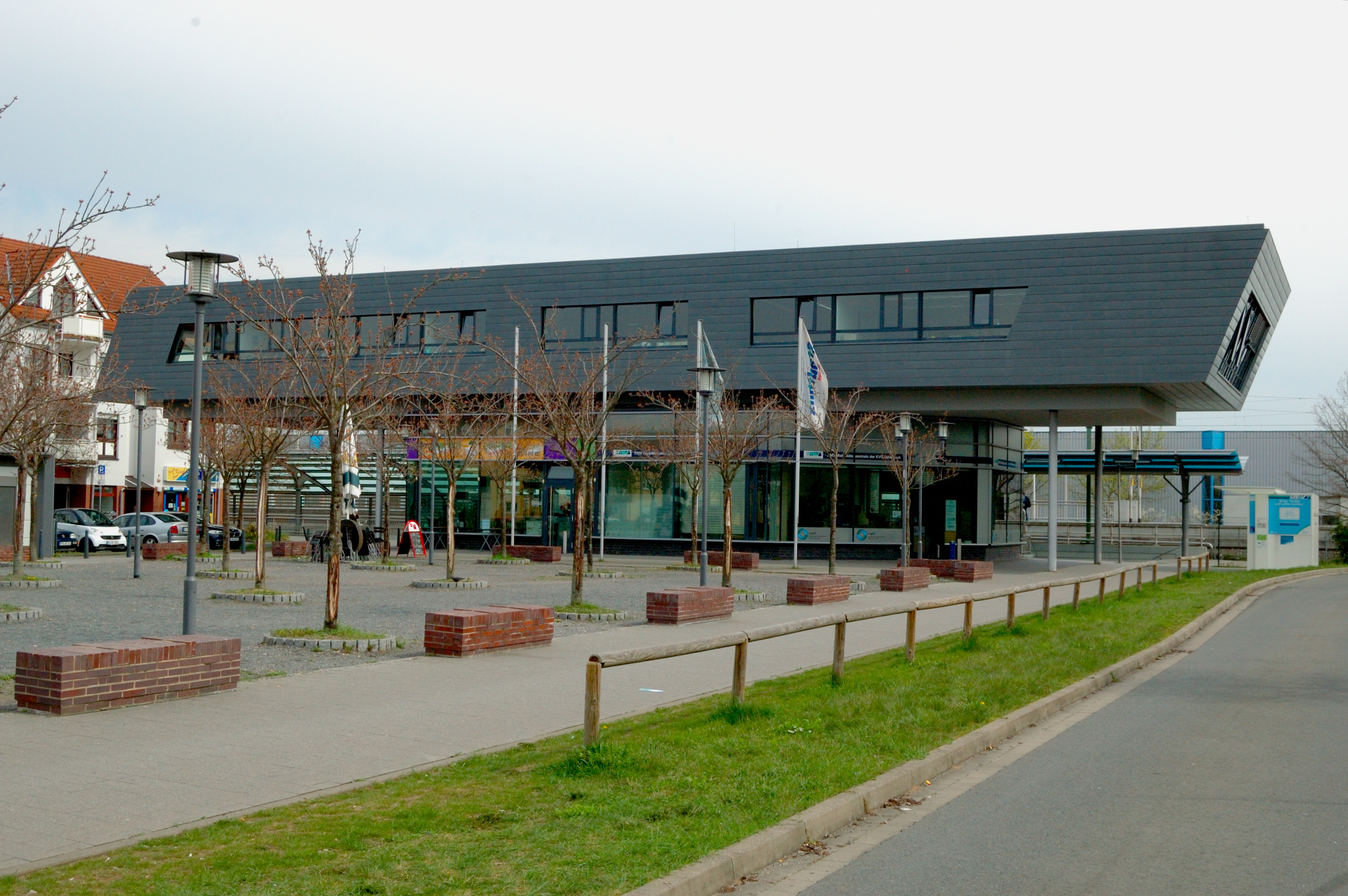
Station forecourt

Dietzenbach-Mitte station was opened as a station on 14 December 2003 during the reconstruction of the Offenbach-Bieber–Dietzenbach railway for S-Bahn operations. Line S2 of the Rhine-Main S-Bahn has operated to Dietzenbach station since then.

The Offenbach-Bieber–Dietzenbach railway was opened as a branch of the Rodgau Railway on 1 December 1898. Trains ran on this line between Dietzenbach (Hess) station and Offenbach Hauptbahnhof. Passenger services on the line were discontinued on 18 June 1982, because traffic on it had been significantly affected by increasing car ownership. The line was then used only for a small amount of freight traffic and the rail passenger services were replaced by buses. S-Bahn services commenced at the 2003/2004 timetable change.

As part of the expansion to the S-Bahn, the station was rebuilt on the existing line. The station is especially popular for commuters from the district of Offenbach, as it is located near the administration of Offenbach district and at a large bus interchange. The so-called Rathaus-Center (town hall centre) is located about 500 metres from the station.

== Infrastructure ==
The station has 2 platforms tracks around an island platform. The lines to Dietzenbach station and towards Offenbach run at ground level. At the southern end of the line, the tracks initially runs over a bridge, before the tracks form into one track. The line continues as two tracks from the northern end of the platform to Dietzenbach-Steinberg station.

== Operations ==
Today, the station is served exclusively by services on S-Bahn line S2. These run to Niedernhausen via Heusenstamm, Offenbach, Frankfurt and Hofheim. In the opposite direction, the S2 runs to Dietzenbach station.

The S-Bahn trains run on a basic cycle of 30 minutes. During the peak, services run every 15 minutes.

=== Bus services ===
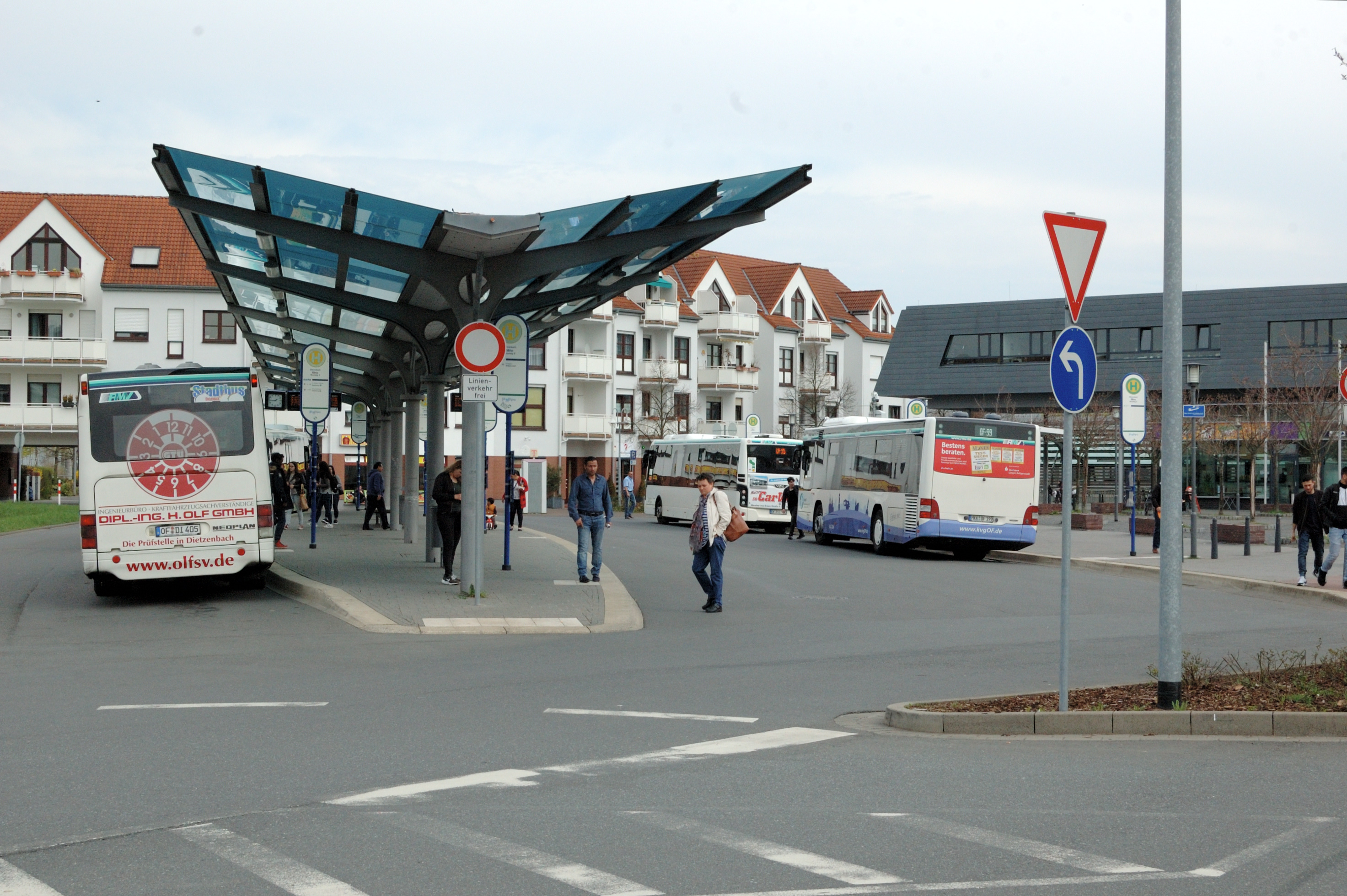
Bus station

Dietzenbach-Mitte station is served by Dietzenbach municipal bus routes OF-56 and OF-57, as well as by the regional bus routes OF-95, OF-96 and OF-99.
