= Heusenstamm station =

Railway station in Germany

Heusenstamm
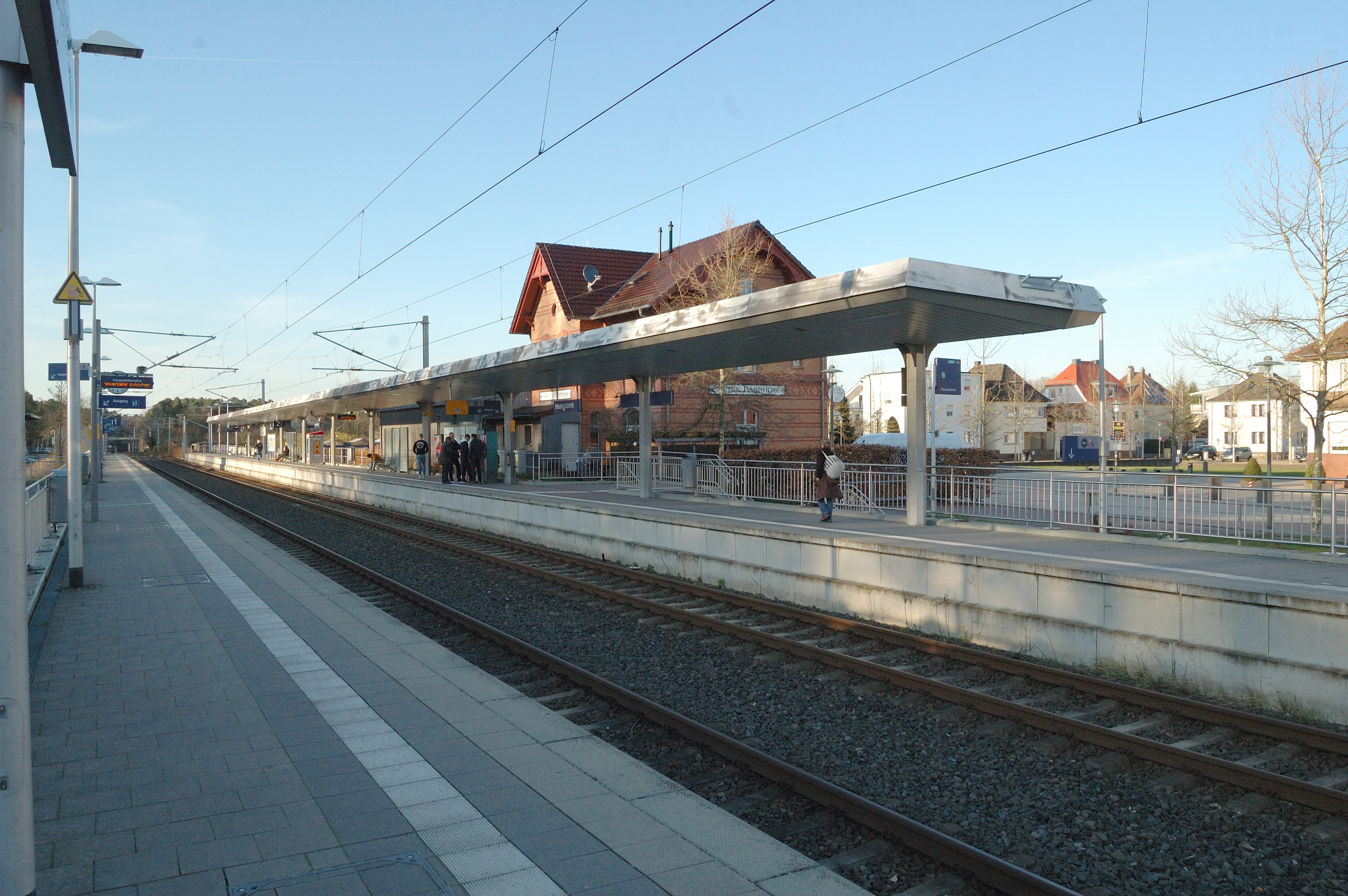

General information
- Location: Eisenbahnstraße 1, Heusenstamm, Hesse; Germany
- Coordinates: 50°03′36″N 8°48′08″E
- Line: Offenbach-Bieber–Dietzenbach (km 7.8)
- Platforms: 2

Construction
- Accessible: Yes

Other information
- Station code: 7167
- DS100 code: FHEU
- IBNR: 8002822
- Category: 5
- Fare zone: : 3680
- Website: www.bahnhof.de

History
- Opened: 1 December 1898

Services
Preceding station	Rhine-Main S-Bahn	Following station
Offenbach-Bieber towards Niedernhausen	S2 (Rhine-Main S-Bahn)	Dietzenbach-Steinberg towards Dietzenbach
Location
- Location within Hesse

Heusenstamm station is the station of Heusenstamm in the German state of Hesse. It is served by line S2 of the Rhine-Main S-Bahn.

== History ==
Heusenstamm station was opened on 1 December 1898 as a single-track Haltepunkt (halt) along with the Offenbach-Bieber–Dietzenbach railway, which branches off the Rodgau Railway (Rodgaubahn) in Offenbach-Bieber. Trains ran on this line between Dietzenbach (Hess) station and Offenbach Hauptbahnhof.

Passenger services on the line were discontinued on 18 June 1982, because traffic on it had been significantly affected by increasing car ownership. The station had a ticket office until then. The line was then used only for a small amount of freight traffic and the rail passenger services were replaced by buses. Services on line S2 of the Rhine-Main S-Bahn commenced at the 2003/2004 timetable change on 14 December 2003.

In the course of the development of the line for the S-Bahn, the track layout at the station was altered and the line was double-tracked and electrified. The station was rebuilt from 2001 to 2003 with two side platforms for S-Bahn operations that are barrier-free for the disabled. Previously the station had a main platform next to the entrance building and an island platform.

== Entrance building ==
The entrance building from 1898 is listed as a cultural monument under the Hessian monument protection law. The two-storey brick building has been privately owned since 2006 and is now used by the Alter Bahnhof restaurant.

== Operations ==
Today, the station is served exclusively by services on S-Bahn line S2. These run to Niedernhausen via Offenbach, Frankfurt and Hofheim. In the opposite direction, the S2 runs to Dietzenbach station.

The S-Bahn trains run on a basic cycle of 30 minutes. During the peak, services run every 15 minutes.

=== Bus services ===
Heusenstamm station is served by OF-30, OF-96 and X19 operated by BRH ViaBus GmbH. In addition, a dial-a-taxi service (OF-38) operates late at night and on Sundays.
