= Offenbach-Bieber station =

Railway station in Offenbach am Main, Hesse, Germany

Offenbach Bieber
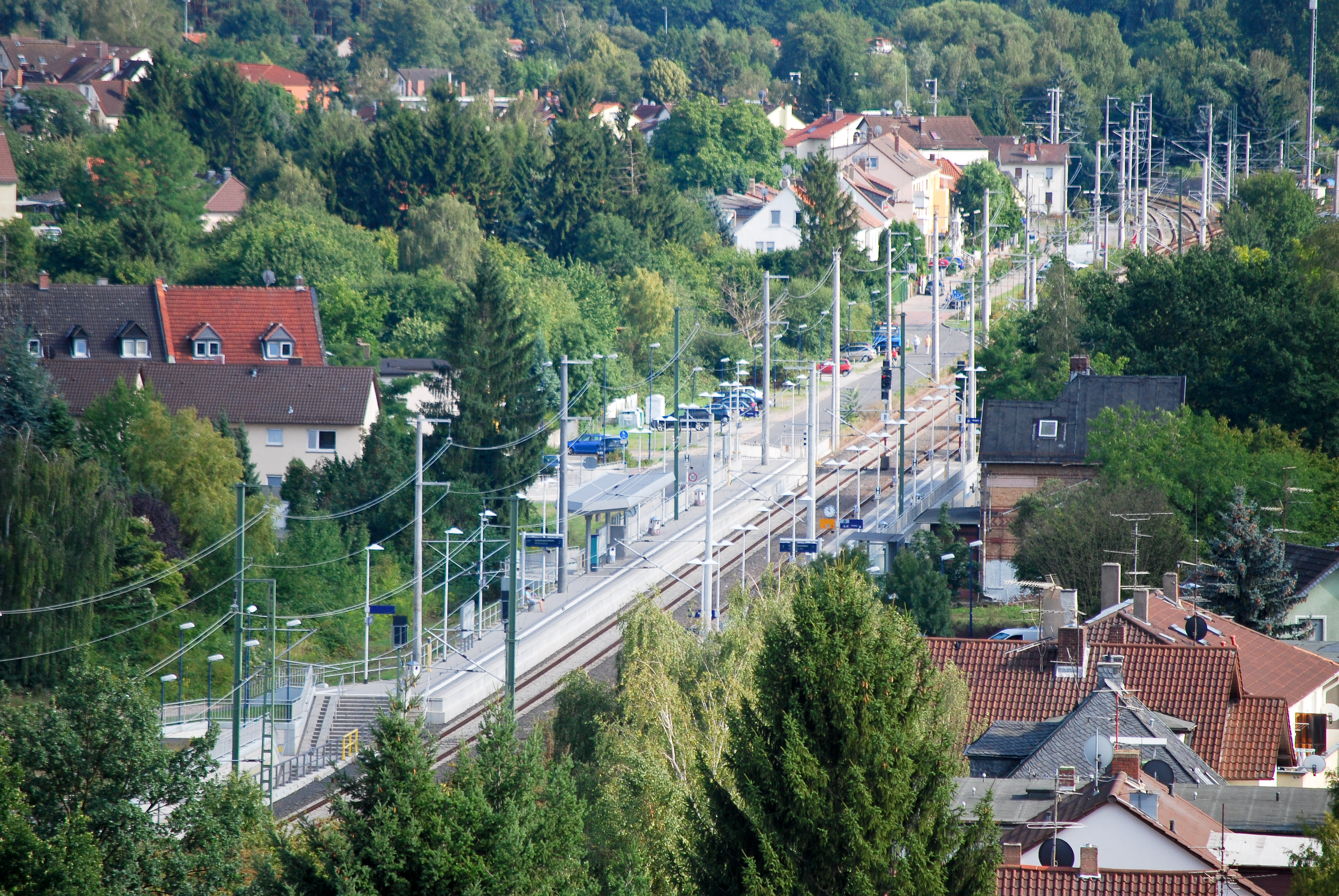

General information
- Location: Poststraße 11, Offenbach-Bieber, Hesse; Germany
- Coordinates: 50°05′25″N 8°48′31″E
- Lines: Rodgau Railway (4.2 km) (KBS 645.1; Offenbach-Bieber–Dietzenbach (4.2 km) (KBS 645.2
- Platforms: 2

Construction
- Accessible: Yes

Other information
- Station code: 4744
- DS100 code: FOB
- IBNR: 8010372
- Category: 5
- Fare zone: : 3601
- Website: www.bahnhof.de

History
- Opened: 30 October 1896

Services
Preceding station	Rhine-Main S-Bahn	Following station
Offenbach Ost towards Wiesbaden Hbf	S1 (Rhine-Main S-Bahn)	Offenbach-Waldhof towards Rödermark-Ober Roden
Offenbach Ost towards Niedernhausen	S2 (Rhine-Main S-Bahn)	Heusenstamm towards Dietzenbach
Location
- Location within Hesse Location within Germany Location within Europe

Offenbach-Bieber is located on the Rodgau Railway (German: Rodgaubahn) in the Bieber district of the city of Offenbach am Main in the German state of Hesse. The Offenbach-Bieber–Dietzenbach railway also starts here. Today the station is served by lines S1 and S2 of the Rhine-Main S-Bahn. The station is classified by Deutsche Bahn as a category 5 station.

== History ==
Bieber station was opened as a station of the Rodgau Railway (Offenbach–Reinheim line) on 30 October 1896. The Rodgau Railway has been operated since 2003 as part of S-Bahn line S1 of the Rhine-Main S-Bahn, but only as far as Rödermark-Ober-Roden. Services between Rödermark-Ober-Roden and Dieburg are operated as an extension of services on the Dreieich Railway (Dreieichbahn), which was opened in 1905. The track between Dieburg and Reinheim has been dismantled.

On 1 December 1898, the Offenbach-Bieber-Dietzenbach railway was opened as a branch line of the Rodgau Railway. On 18 June 1982, passenger services on the line were discontinued. In the 2003/2004 timetable, starting on 14 December 2003, passenger services were re-established with the commencement of S-Bahn services of line S2 on the route between Niedernhausen and Dietzenbach.

In the course of the upgrade for the S-Bahn, changes were made to the tracks at the station as the lines were duplicated and electrified. The station was rebuilt to provide barrier-free access for the disabled. The level crossing on Dietesheimer Straße was removed and replaced by an underpass.

== Entrance Building ==
The station building, built in 1896, is a listed monument under the Hessian Heritage Act. The two-story brick building was sold into private ownership on 30 December 2009 and subsequently there was a dispute over the status of its heritage listing. The building has deteriorated.

== Infrastructure ==
The station has two tracks with external platforms. The lines to Ober-Roden and Dietzenbach branch south of the station at an at-grade junction. The mechanical signal box was closed in 2000.

== Operations ==
The station is now served exclusively by S-Bahn lines S1 and S2. These run to Wiesbaden Central Station and Niedernhausen station via Frankfurt Central Station. In the opposite direction service on line S1 run via Obertshausen and Rodgau to Ober-Roden and on line S2 to Dietzenbach via Heusenstamm. Both S-Bahn lines run at 30 minutes interval. In peak hours they run every 15-minute intervals, with some S1 services running only to Frankfurt- Höchst or Hochheim.

=== Bus ===
Bieber station is served by buses operated by Regionalverkehr Kurhessen and Offenbacher Verkehrs-Betriebe.
