= Rodgau Railway =

Railway line in Germany

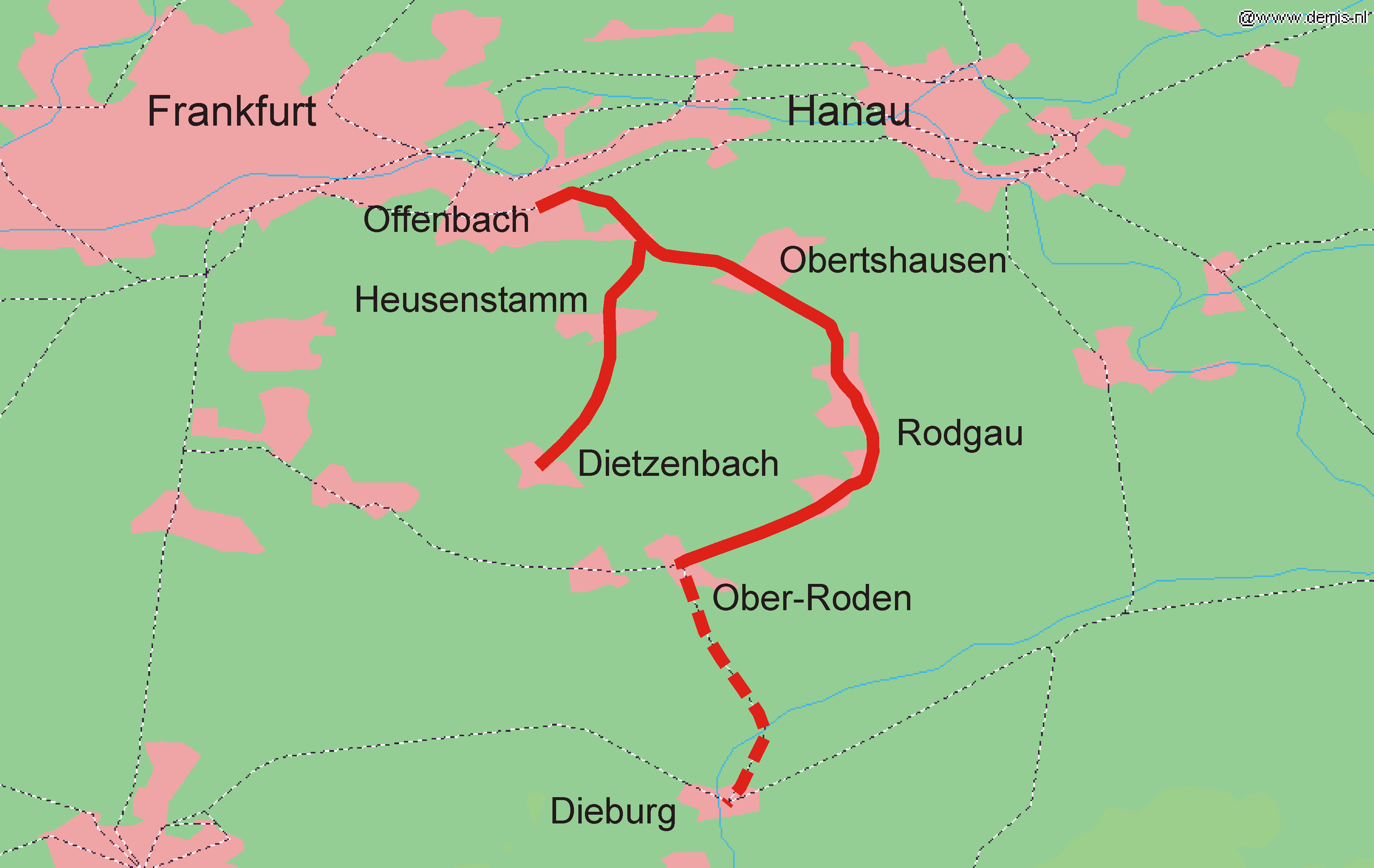

Overview
- Native name: Rodgaubahn
- Status: Operational
- Owner: Deutsche Bahn
- Line number: 3661 (Offenbach–Dieburg–Reinheim)
- Locale: Hesse, Germany
- Termini: Offenbach (Main) Hauptbahnhof; Rödermark-Ober Roden
- Stations: 12

Service
- Type: Heavy rail, Passenger rail Commuter rail
- Route number: 645.1 and 645.2
- Operator(s): DB Regio Hessen
- Rolling stock: DBAG Class 423; DBAG Class 430

History
- Opened: 30 September 1896
- Closed: 1967 (Dieburg – Groß-Zimmern); 1989 (Groß-Zimmern – Reinheim)

Technical
- Line length: 21.9 km (13.6 mi)
- Number of tracks: Double track: Offenbach Ost–Rödermark-Ober Roden
- Track gauge: 1,435 mm (4 ft 8 1/2 in) standard gauge
- Electrification: 15 kV/16.7 Hz AC overhead catenary

The Rodgau Railway (Rodgaubahn) is a railway line that runs from Offenbach Central Station (Offenbach am Main Hauptbahnhof) via Rodgau to Rödermark-Ober-Roden in the German state of Hesse. The name Rodgaubahn is derived from the medieval name of Rodgau, part of the former Maingau (Main district), which the line passes through for its whole length.

== History ==
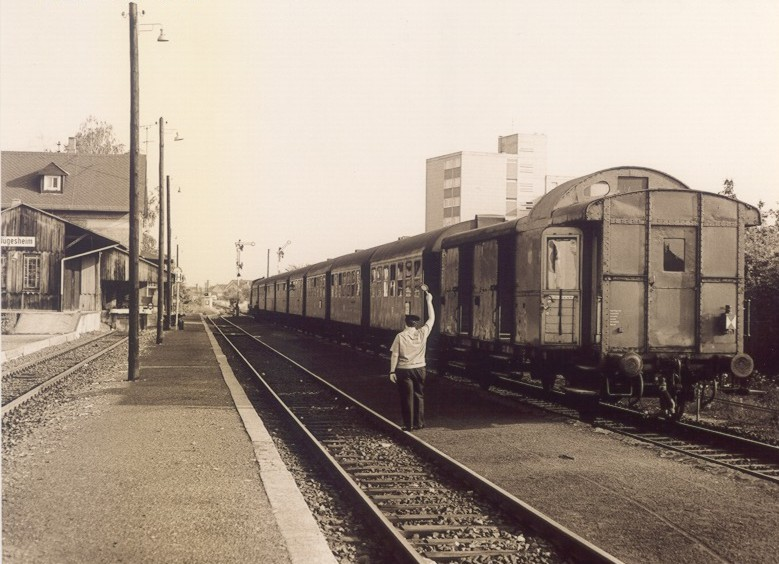
Jügesheim station on the Rodgau Railway in 1978

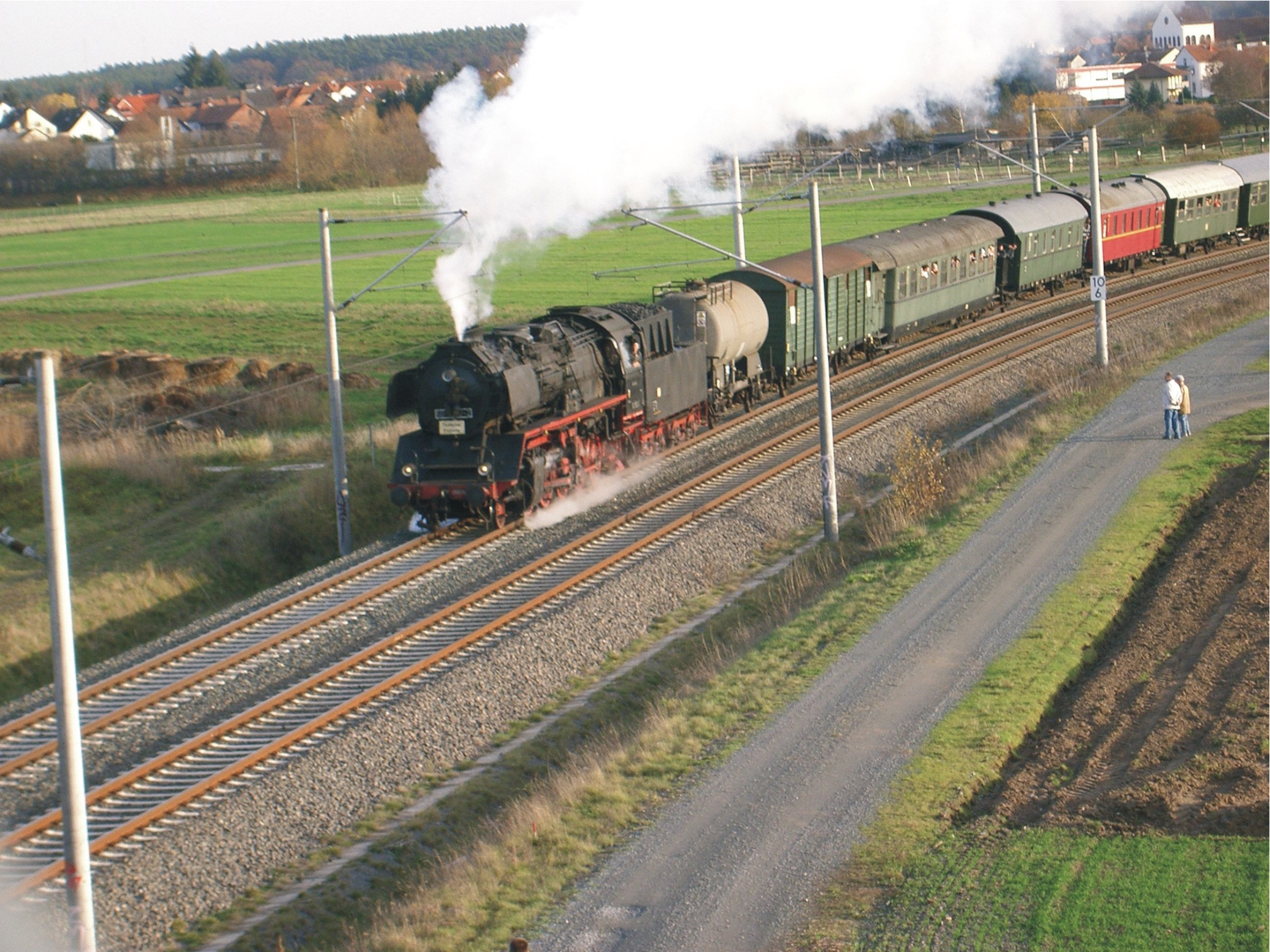
Heritage train on the S1 in November 2006

Since about 1870 there were serious proposals from local interest groups for the building of a railway to open up the Rodgau, but at first the government of the Grand Duchy of Hesse did not respond to them. An Eisenbahncomitée (railway committee) was formed after the first, unsuccessful, initiative in 1877. But this took four years to get a response from Darmstadt, the capital of the Duchy, during which the committee carried out preparatory work for an Offenbach–Reinheim railway project at its own expense. It took until 1888 before the government gave final approval and after further discussions about the connection of the railway in Offenbach with the Prussian state railways in 1895, planning permission was granted. It was decided that the line would have its own station in Offenbach south of the Prussian state railways' station. The line was built by the Grand Duchy of Hesse State Railways. On 30 September 1896, the new line (now line number 3661) was opened from Offenbach via Dieburg to Reinheim with a length of 42.2 kilometres.

In the following years, the Rodgau Railway was connected to two other railways:

- On 1 December 1898, a branch line was opened from Offenbach-Bieber, the Offenbach-Bieber–Dietzenbach railway.
- On 1 April 1905, a connection was opened in Ober-Roden to the new Dreieich Railway (Dreieichbahn) from Buchschlag.

In 1923, the railway was built on an embankment in the city of Offenbach in order to remove level crossings with streets. This involved the rebuilding of the central station in Offenbach as a single station and the abandonment of the Rodgau Railway’s own station.

=== Operational history ===
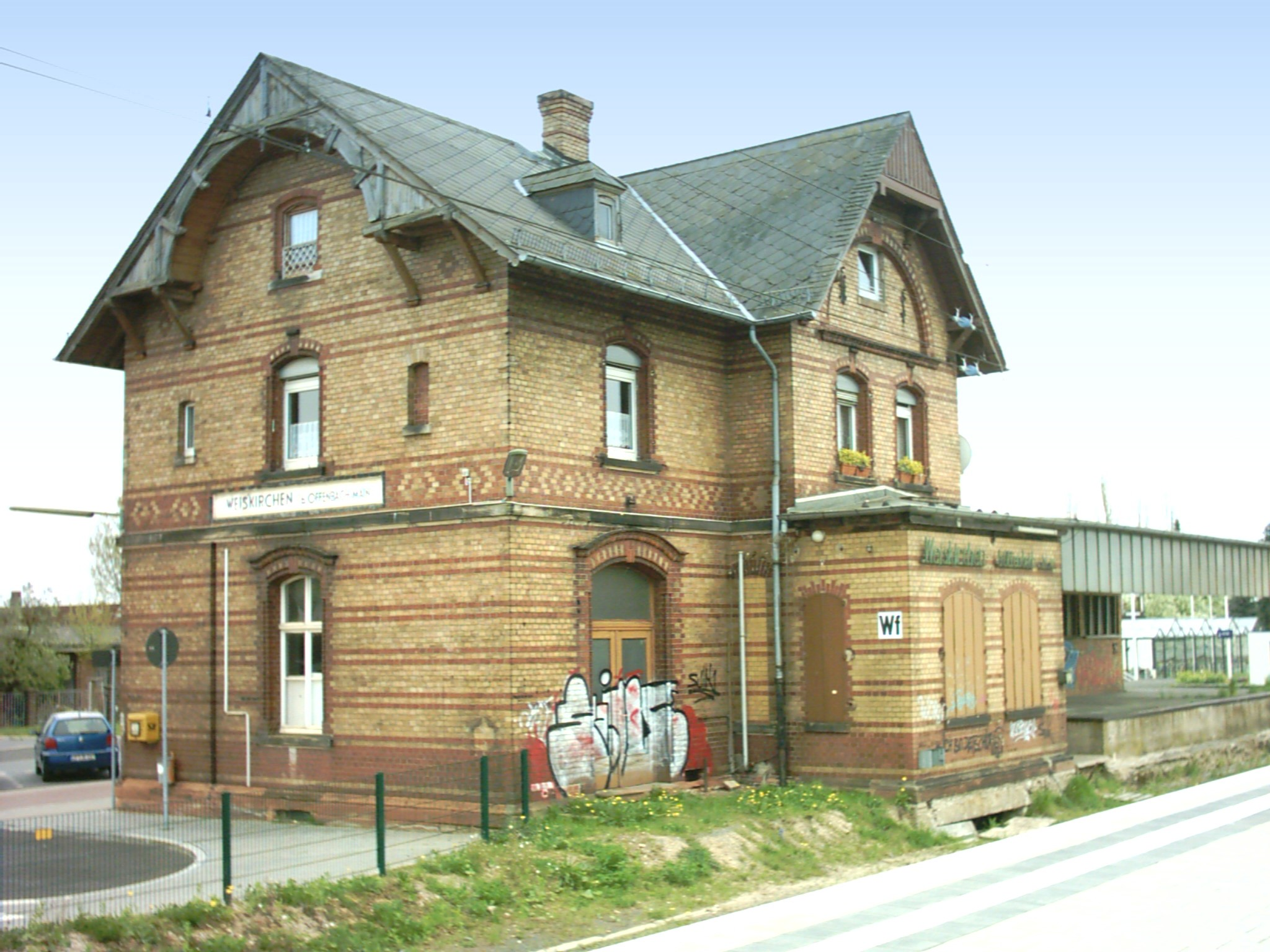
Old station building at Weiskirchen

Initially, four pairs of trains operated daily. After the connection of the Dreieich Railway, there were only two pairs of through trains between Offenbach and Dieburg. The first trains were steam hauled; after the Second World War trains were increasingly hauled by diesel locomotives. The importance of the connection lay in the growing commuter traffic from the district of Offenbach, especially for those working in the leather goods industry in Offenbach.

On 28 May 1965, the line between Dieburg and Reinheim was closed for passengers, partly because of the operation of the parallel bus route. In 1967, this section of the line was dismantled, beginning with the section between Dieburg and Groß-Zimmern. Freight trains ran to and from the Odenwald Railway (Odenwaldbahn) over the Darmstadt Ost–Groß-Zimmern railway until it was closed in 1970. In 1989, the remaining section of the line to Reinheim was closed.

=== Conversion to S-Bahn operations ===
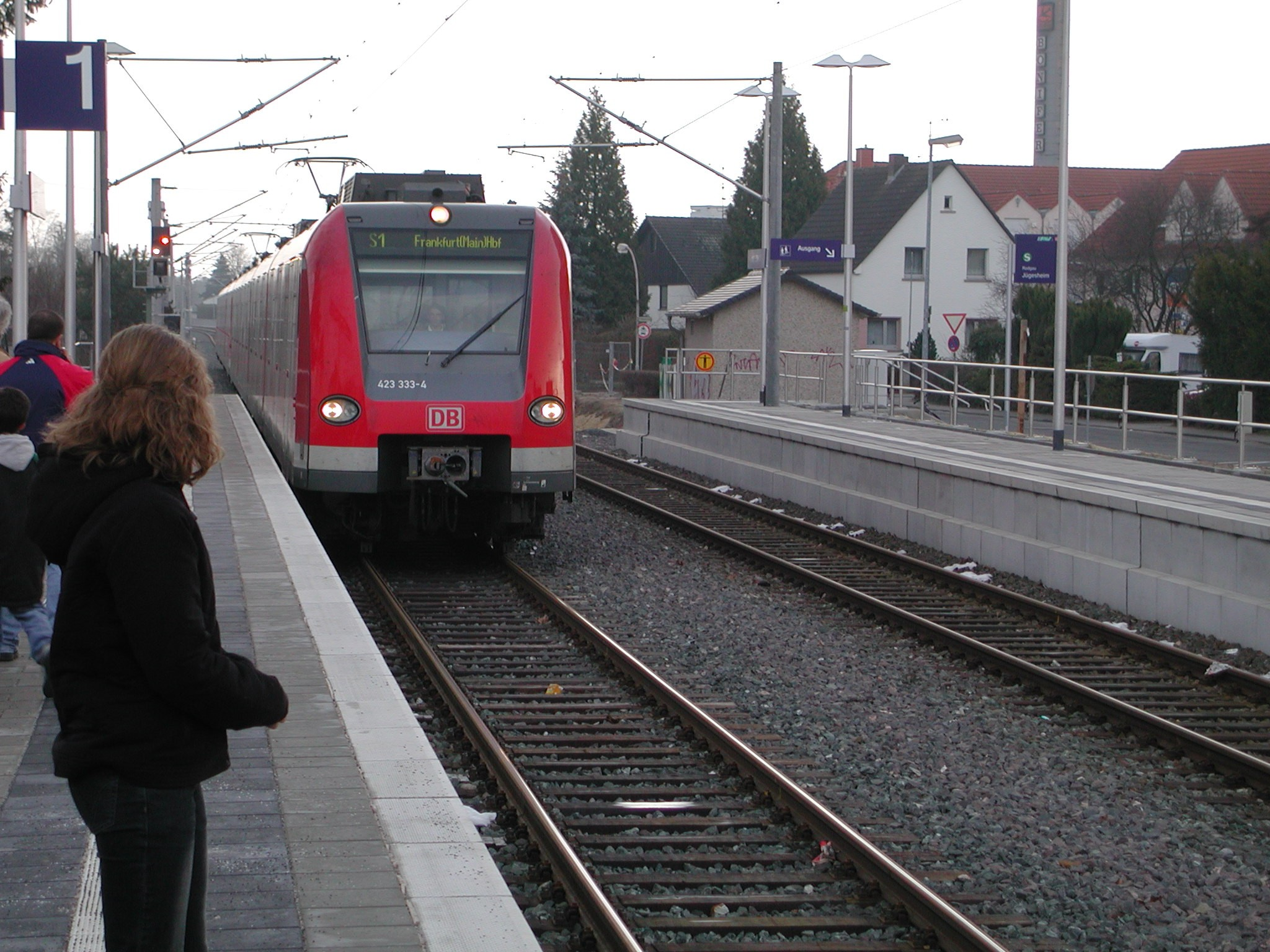
S1 at Jügesheim station in 2003

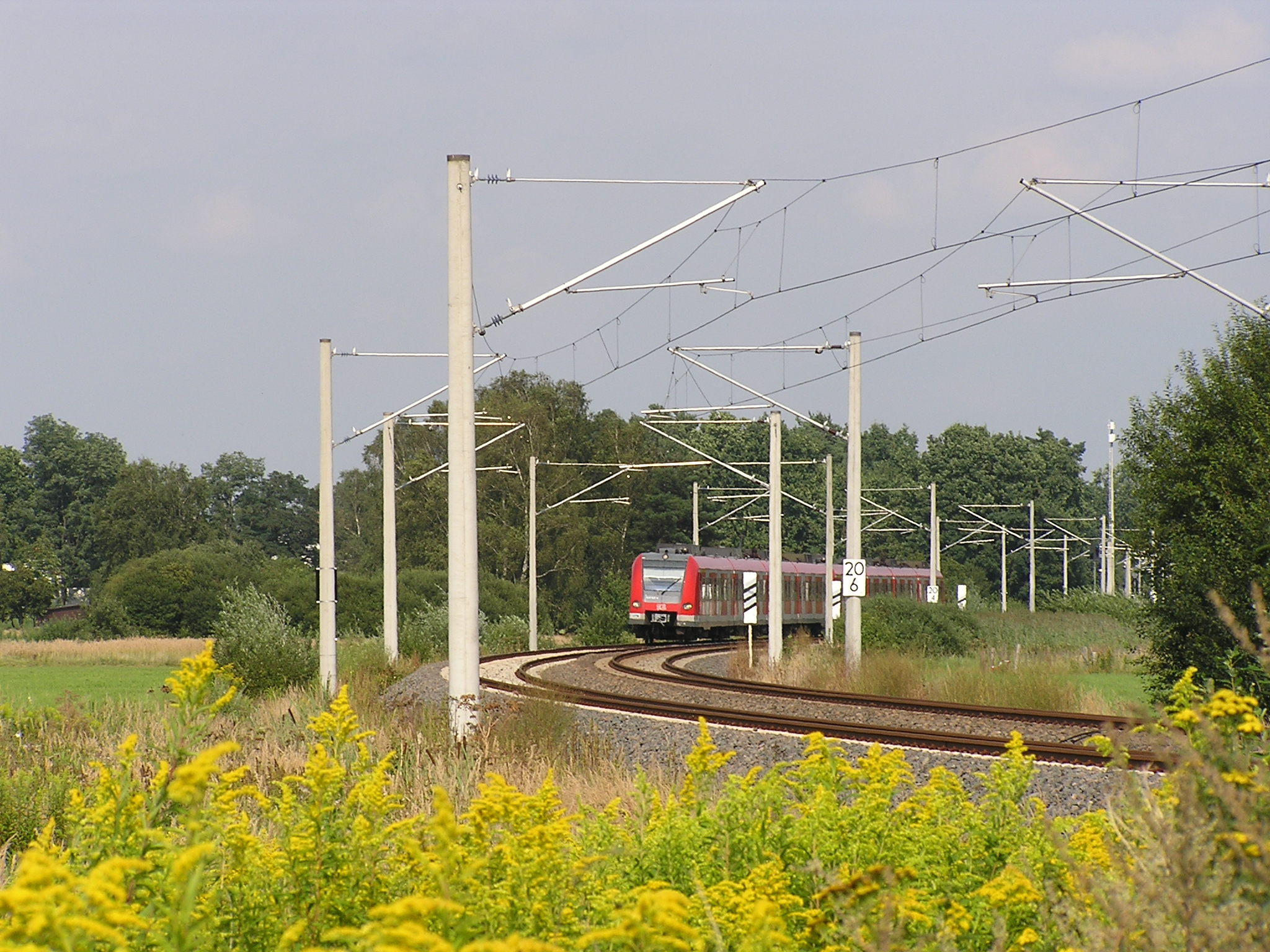
S1 near Rodgau-Rollwald

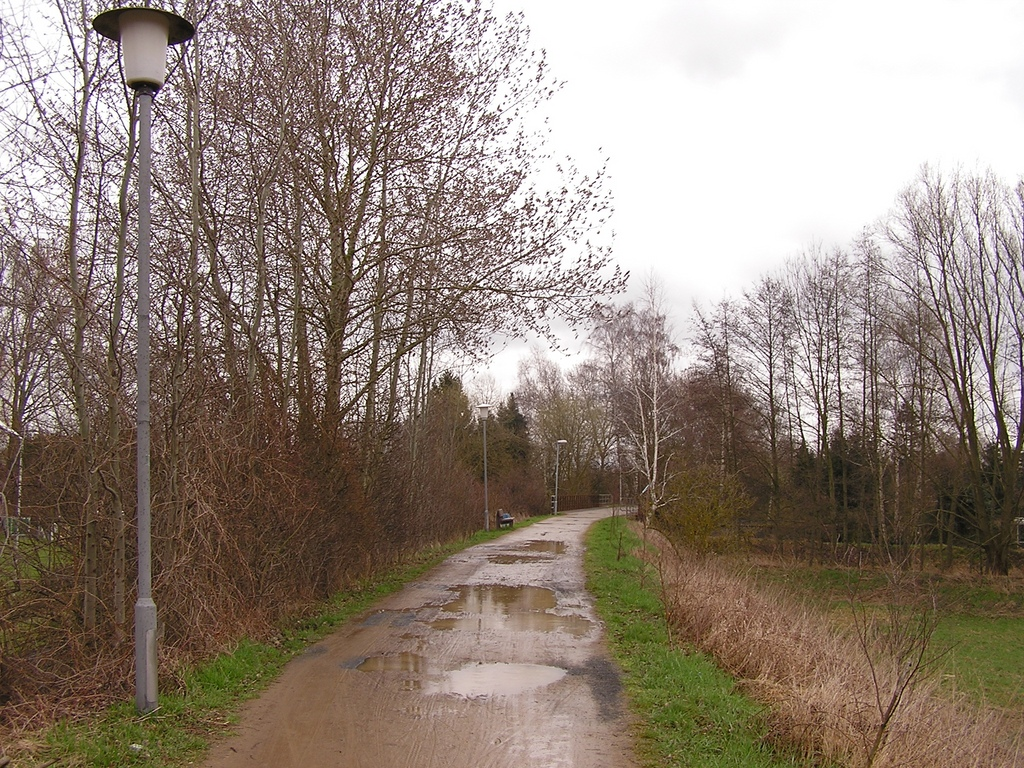
Old trackbed in front of Dieburg

The establishment of an S-Bahn operation on the track was considered in the late 1950s. It was not, however, until 23 March 2001 that the line to Dietzenbach began to be reconstructed as a double-track electrified line of the Frankfurt S-Bahn network. In the course of the development work, 13 stations were modernised and two rebuilt. 15 bridges were rebuilt and 18 level crossings were secured with new barrier systems.

S-Bahn operations began on the Rodgau line at the beginning of the 2003/2004 timetable on 14 December 2003. The line is operated by DB Regio as part of the Rhine-Main S-Bahn network as line S 1 (Wiesbaden–Ober-Roden), the northern section of the line is also used by line S 2 (Niedernhausen–Dietzenbach). Proposed extensions of line S1 to Dieburg and S2 to Ober-Roden failed as they were found not to be economically justified. Therefore, the section from Ober-Roden to Dieburg has not been electrified. This section of the line is now operated as part of the Dreieich Railway from Buchschlag.
