= S2 (Rhine-Main S-Bahn) =

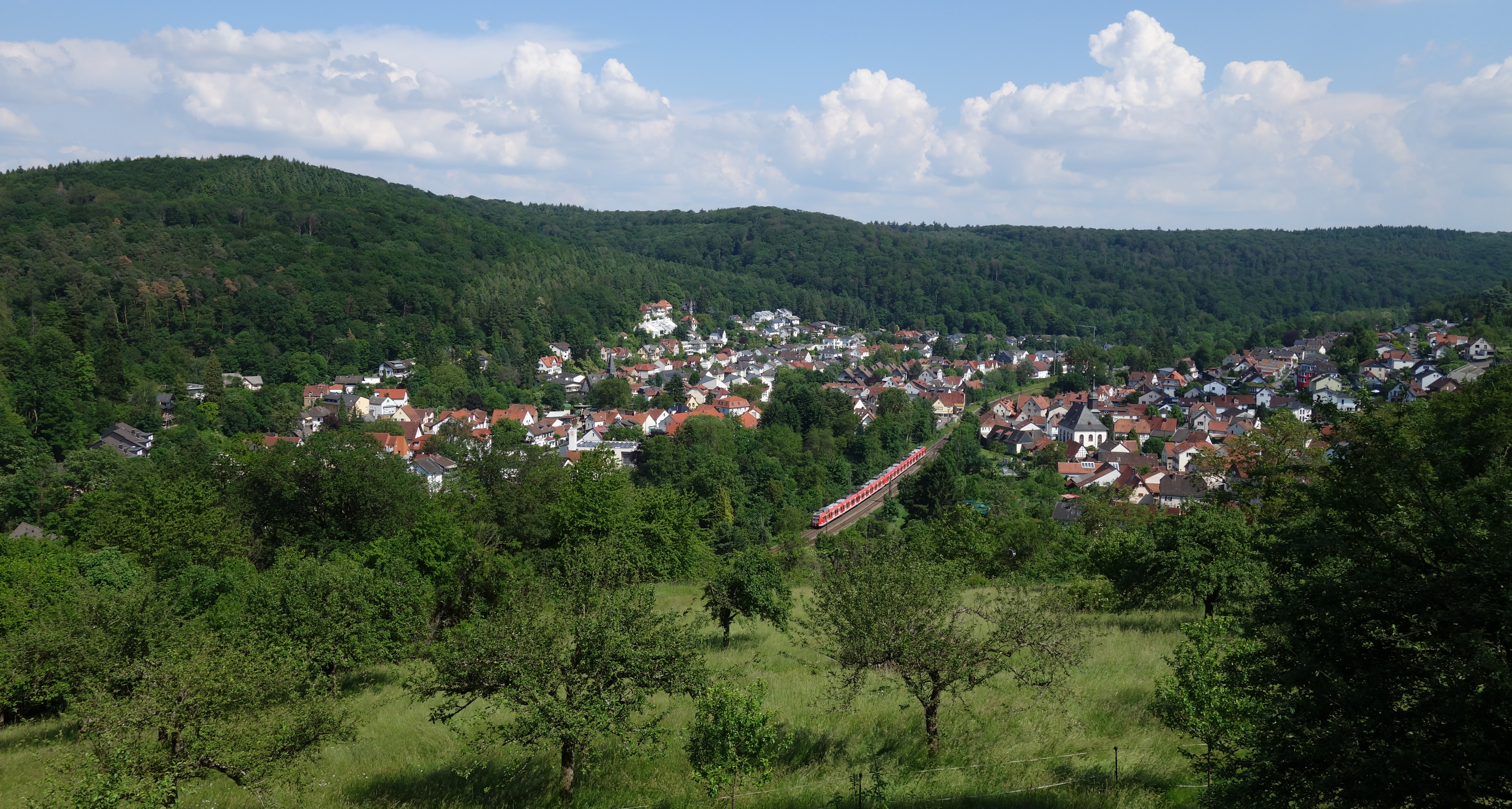
- DB class 423 as S2 heading for Niedernhausen passing Hofheim-Lorsbach

Overview
- Status: Operational
- Owner: Rhein-Main-Verkehrsverbund
- Line number: 2
- Locale: Frankfurt Rhine-Main
- Termini: Niedernhausen; Dietzenbach
- Stations: 27

Service
- Type: Rapid transit, Commuter rail
- System: S-Bahn Rhein-Main
- Services: Main-Lahn Railway; Citytunnel Frankfurt, Frankfurt Schlachthof–Hanau railway; Rodgau Railway; Offenbach-Bieber–Dietzenbach railway
- Route number: 645.2
- Operator(s): DB Regio
- Depot(s): Frankfurt Hbf
- Rolling stock: DBAG Class 423

History
- Opened: 28 May 1978

Technical
- Line length: 54.7 km (34.0 mi)
- Track gauge: 1,435 mm (4 ft 8 1/2 in) standard gauge
- Electrification: Overhead line

The S2 service of the S-Bahn Rhein-Main system bearing the KBS (German scheduled railway route) number 645.2 is a railway connection between the small Taunus town Niedernhausen and Dietzenbach.

Usually DBAG Class 423 railcars are used on this service. Its predecessor class 420 is only used for shortened shuttle services.

According to a news report issued by Hessenschau, the S2 is the least punctual of the system, with only 83% of trains leaving on time.

== Routes ==
=== Main-Lahn railway ===
The service uses the tracks of the Main-Lahn Railway between Niedernhausen and Frankfurt Central Station. This route is also used by regional trains in the section Niedernhausen–Frankfurt-Höchst. Between Frankfurt-Höchst and Central Station this service shares the Main-Lahn line with freight and shunting operations. National and regional services use the parallel running Taunus railway in this section. The Main-Lahn railway was completed on 15 October 1877 and has been used by S-Bahn services since 1978.

=== City tunnel ===
The city tunnel is an underground, pure S-Bahn route used by almost all services (except for the S7 service which terminates at the central station). The tunnel was opened in four stages in 1978, 1983, 1990 and 1992. In a short section between Mühlberg and Offenbach-Kaiserlei the Frankfurt Schlachthof–Hanau railway is used. The section from Mühlberg to Offenbach Ost through the Offenbach City Tunnel was opened in 1995.

=== Rodgau railway ===
This line was opened in 1896 and has been used since 2003 only by S-Bahn services.

=== Offenbach-Bieber–Dietzenbach railway ===
This line was opened on 1 December 1898 and has been used since 2003 only by S-Bahn services.

== History ==
Year	Stations	Route
1974 (R2)	11	Niedernhausen – Frankfurt Hbf
1978	13 (+2)	Niedernhausen – Hauptwache
1983	14 (+1)	Niedernhausen – Konstablerwache
1990	17 (+3)	Niedernhausen – Frankfurt Süd
1992	16 (+1, -2)	Niedernhausen – Mühlberg
1995	17 (+2, -1)	Niedernhausen – Frankfurt Süd
2002	18 (+1)	Niedernhausen – Frankfurt Süd
2003	26 (+10, -2)	Niedernhausen – Dietzenbach
2007	27 (+1)	Niedernhausen – Dietzenbach

The S2 was one of the first six services of the Rhine-Main S-Bahn system. In a prior test operation it ran between Niedernhausen and Frankfurt Central Station. The service was then called R2 where the letter "R" stands for regional. In 1975 the R2 was the system's first service employing the class 420 trainset. After the opening of the Frankfurt Citytunnel the service was renamed to S2 and extended to the new Hauptwache underground station. Further extensions of the tunnel followed in 1983 (Konstablerwache) and 1990 (Ostendstraße and Lokalbahnhof) so that the Südbahnhof (South station) became the service's eastern terminal. After the opening of the eastern Citytunnel branch to the Mühlberg station in 1992 the S2 started operation in this section shutting down its service to Lokalbahnhof and Südbahnhof until in 1995 the service resumed its pre-1992 operation. In 2002, Eppstein-Bremthal station was completed increasing the number of stations to 18.

In 2003 the Offenbach Citytunnel and the Rodgau railway was included. After two years of construction work this route was changed to S-Bahn operation. Since then the new eastern terminal station is Dietzenbach. In 2007 the new Frankfurt-Zeilsheim station was included to the S2 service.

== Operation ==
1. Niedernhausen – Dietzenbach
2. Niedernhausen – Offenbach Ost
3. Niedernhausen – Frankfurt Hbf
4. Hofheim – Frankfurt Hbf
5. Griesheim – Dietzenbach
6. Offenbach Ost – Dietzenbach

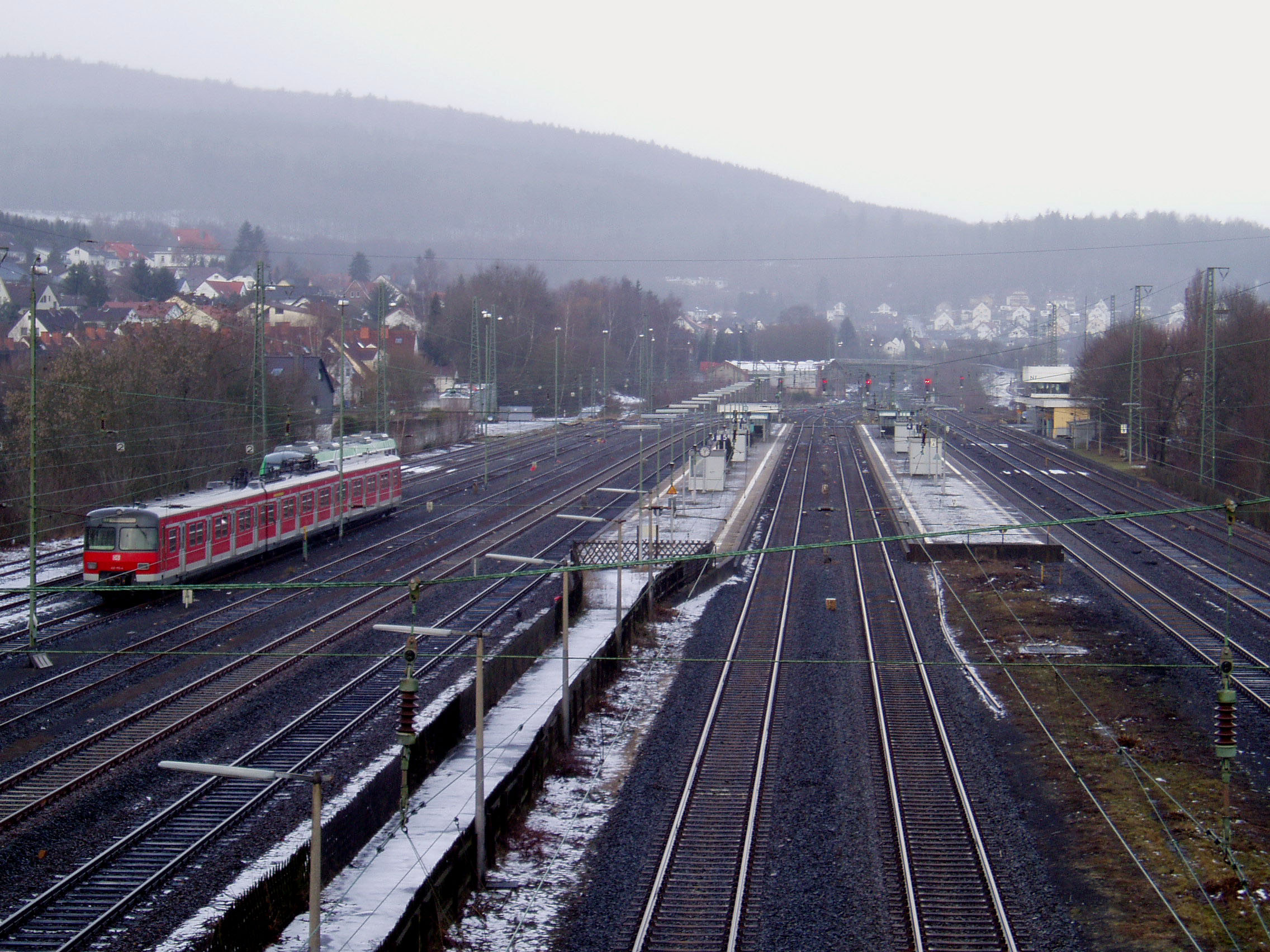
End of the line at Niedernhausen

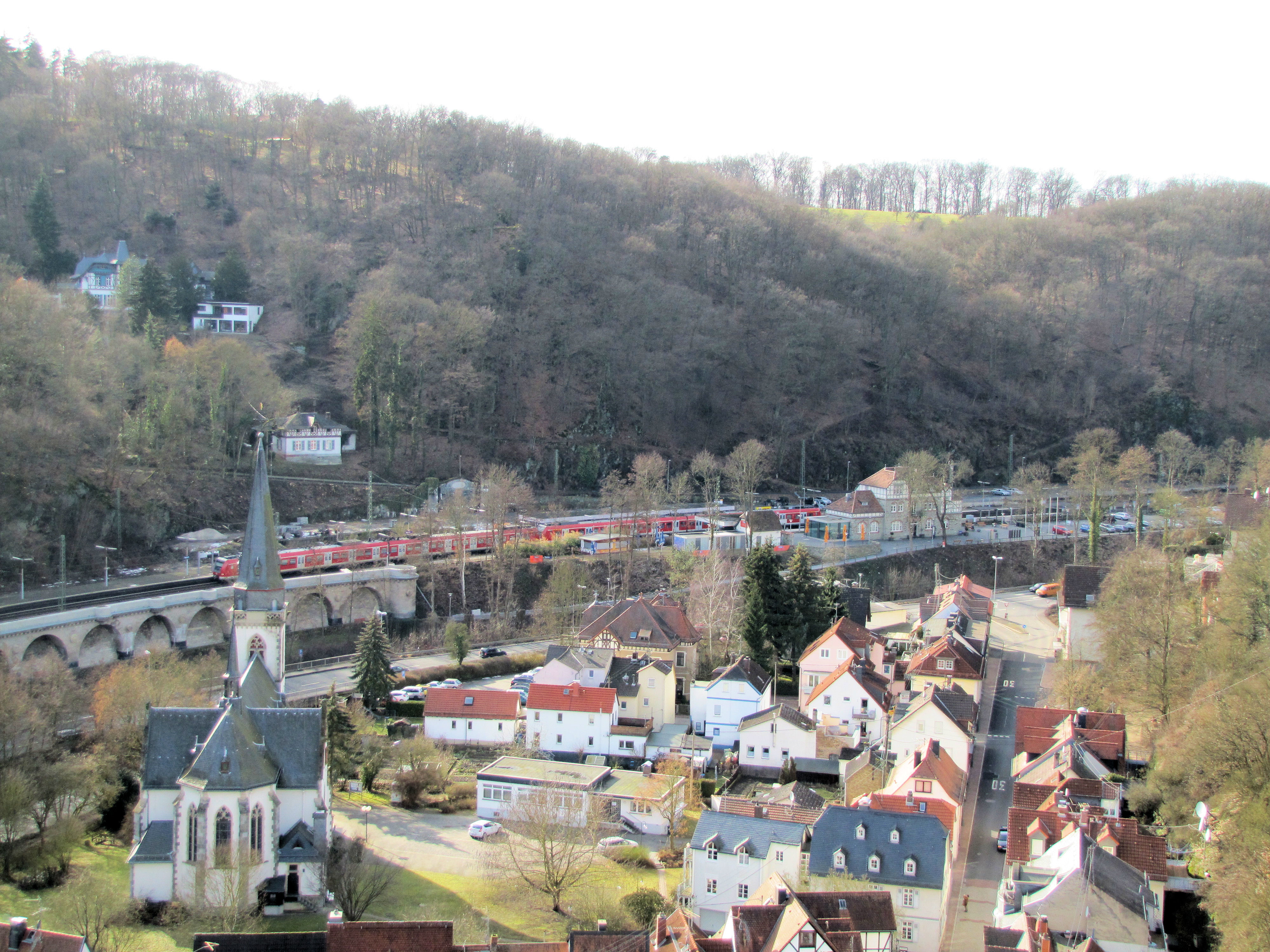
Crossing the valley at Eppstein

S2 (Rhine-Main S-Bahn)						Journey time		Station	Transfer	S-Bahn service since
1	2	3	4	5	6					
=== Rheingau-Taunus-Kreis ===
						0		Niedernhausen		1978
=== Main-Taunus-Kreis ===
						3	+3	Eppstein-Niederjosbach		1978
						5	+2	Eppstein-Bremthal		2002
						7	+2	Eppstein		1978
						12	+5	Hofheim-Lorsbach		1978
						15	+3	Hofheim		1978
						18	+3	Kriftel		1978
=== Frankfurt am Main ===
						20	+2	Frankfurt-Zeilsheim		2007
						23	+3	Farbwerke	S1 (Rhine-Main S-Bahn)	1978
						26	+3	Frankfurt-Höchst	S1 (Rhine-Main S-Bahn)	1978
						28	+2	Frankfurt-Nied	S1 (Rhine-Main S-Bahn)	1978
						31	+3	Frankfurt-Griesheim	S1 (Rhine-Main S-Bahn)	1978
						37	+6	Frankfurt Hbf	U4 U5	1978
						36	+5	Frankfurt Hbf (tief)	U4 U5	1978
						38	+2	Taunusanlage	S1 (Rhine-Main S-Bahn) S3 (Rhine-Main S-Bahn) S4 (Rhine-Main S-Bahn) S5 (Rhine-Main S-Bahn) S6 (Rhine-Main S-Bahn) S8 (Rhine-Main S-Bahn) S9 (Rhine-Main S-Bahn)	1978
						40	+2	Hauptwache	U1 U2 U3 U6 U7 U8	1978
						42	+2	Konstablerwache	U4 U5 U6 U7	1983
						43	+1	Ostendstraße	S1 (Rhine-Main S-Bahn) S3 (Rhine-Main S-Bahn) S4 (Rhine-Main S-Bahn) S5 (Rhine-Main S-Bahn) S6 (Rhine-Main S-Bahn) S8 (Rhine-Main S-Bahn) S9 (Rhine-Main S-Bahn)	1990
						45	+2	Mühlberg	S1 (Rhine-Main S-Bahn) S8 (Rhine-Main S-Bahn) S9 (Rhine-Main S-Bahn)	1992
=== Offenbach ===
						48	+3	Offenbach-Kaiserlei	S1 (Rhine-Main S-Bahn) S8 (Rhine-Main S-Bahn) S9 (Rhine-Main S-Bahn)	1995
						50	+2	Ledermuseum	S1 (Rhine-Main S-Bahn) S8 (Rhine-Main S-Bahn) S9 (Rhine-Main S-Bahn)	1995
						52	+2	Marktplatz	S1 (Rhine-Main S-Bahn) S8 (Rhine-Main S-Bahn) S9 (Rhine-Main S-Bahn)	1995
						55	+3	Offenbach Ost	S1 (Rhine-Main S-Bahn) S8 (Rhine-Main S-Bahn) S9 (Rhine-Main S-Bahn)	1995
						57	+3	Offenbach-Bieber	S1 (Rhine-Main S-Bahn)	2003
=== Kreis Offenbach ===
						61	+4	Heusenstamm		2003
						64	+3	Dietzenbach-Steinberg		2003
						66	+2	Dietzenbach-Mitte		2003
						68	+2	Dietzenbach		2003
