= Frankfurt-Höchst station =

Railway station in Frankfurt, Germany

Frankfurt Höchst
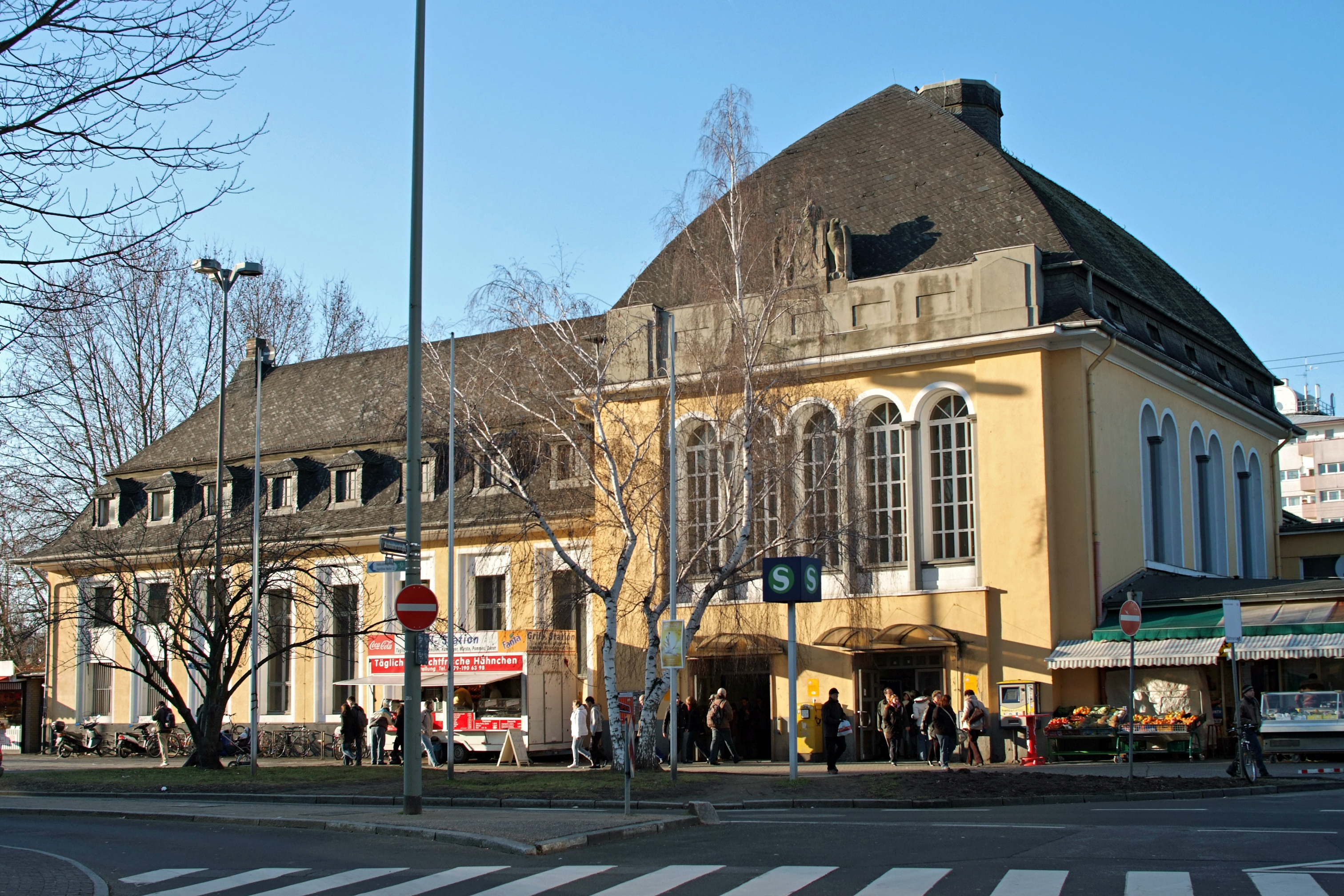

General information
- Location: Frankfurt am Main, Hesse; Germany
- Coordinates: 50°6′9″N 8°32′33″E
- Lines: Königstein Railway; Main-Lahn Railway; Soden Railway; Taunus Railway
- Platforms: 7

Construction
- Architectural style: Art Nouveau

Other information
- Station code: 1872
- DS100 code: FHOE
- IBNR: 8000106
- Category: 3
- Fare zone: : 5002
- Website: www.bahn.de

History
- Opened: 1839 (current station building opened 1914)

Passengers
- 22,500

Services
Preceding station	DB Regio Mitte	Following station
Hofheim towards Limburg (Lahn)	RE 20	Frankfurt (Main) Hbf Terminus
Hofheim towards Limburg (Lahn)	RB 22	Frankfurt (Main) Hbf Terminus
Preceding station	VIAS	Following station
Kastel towards Neuwied	RB 10	Frankfurt (Main) Hbf Terminus
Preceding station	Start	Following station
Sossenheim towards Bad Soden	RB 11	Terminus
Frankfurt-Unterliederbach towards Königstein (Taunus)	RB 12	Frankfurt (Main) Hbf towards Frankfurt (Main) Hbf
Preceding station	Rhine-Main S-Bahn	Following station
Höchst Farbwerke towards Wiesbaden Hbf	S1 (Rhine-Main S-Bahn)	Nied towards Rödermark-Ober Roden
Höchst Farbwerke towards Niedernhausen	S2 (Rhine-Main S-Bahn)	Nied towards Dietzenbach
Location

The Frankfurt-Höchst station is an important station in the Frankfurt district of Höchst and is the second largest station in the city with twelve tracks. It is currently mainly used by S-Bahn, suburban and regional services.

== History ==
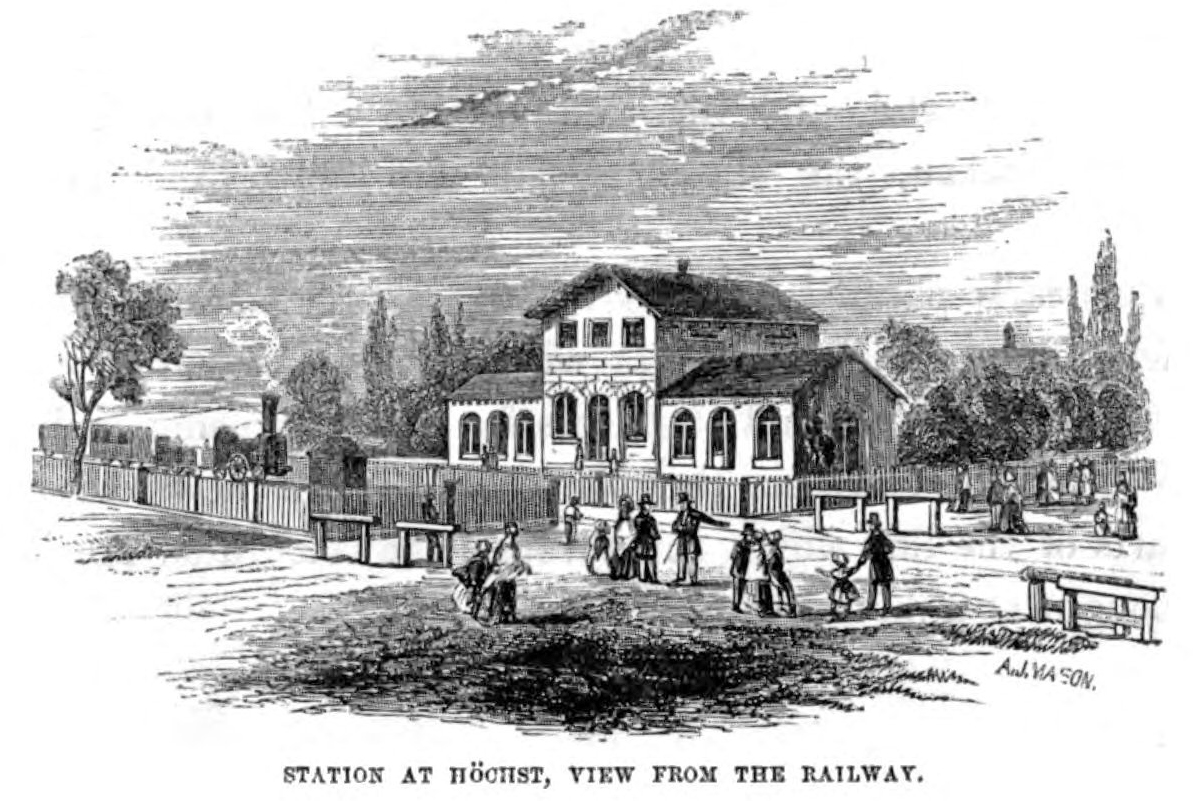
Höchst station in 1839 in an English engraving of 1846

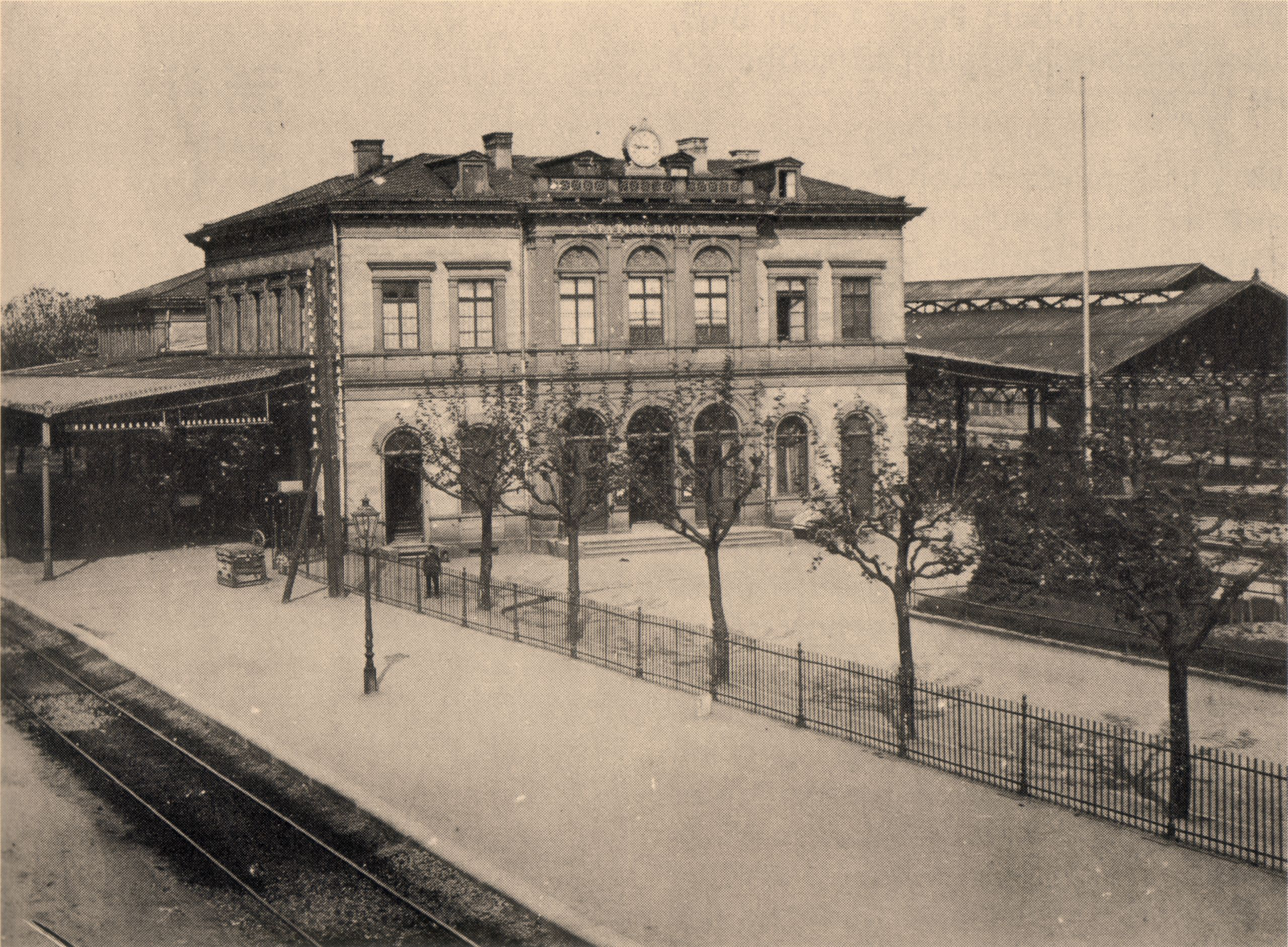
The second Höchst station in 1880

The first Höchst station was built as part of one of the oldest railways in Germany. On 26 September 1839, four years after the opening of Germany's first railway from Nuremberg to Fürth, the first section of the Taunus Railway opened from the Taunus station in Frankfurt, running nine kilometres west to Höchst. The original Höchst station was located 400 metres east of the current location on Königsteiner Straße.

At the time, the line was an international route, connecting the Free City of Frankfurt and the Duchy of Nassau. On 19 May 1840, the line was completed via Hattersheim, Flörsheim and Mainz-Kastel (then in the Grand Duchy of Hesse) to Wiesbaden, the capital of Nassau. The entire route from the current S-Bahn station of Taunusanlage to Wiesbaden is now part of the busy S-Bahn S1 line.

A second line was connected to Höchst in 1847 with the opening of the short Soden Railway—Germany's oldest branch line. It linked the major spa of Bad Soden with the rest of the world. In 1877, a railway known as the Limburg Railway was established. This railway was particularly important as it connected Frankfurt to the Lahn Valley Railway, which ran between Gießen and Koblenz, crossing Nassau. Nassau had been annexed by Prussia due to the 1866 War.

In 1880, the old station building of 1839 was replaced by a new building. It was designed by the royal inspector of railways and industry (German: Königlicher Eisenbahn- und Betriebsinspektor), Heinrich Velde, who designed a total of 37 stations in the Rhine-Main area. One of which is the Höchst station, considered as his architectural tour de force. The new building was built on an “island” between the tracks of the Limburg line to the south and the Taunus and Sodene lines to the north, west of Königsteiner Straße.

In 1902, the Königstein Railway was opened via Kelkheim to Königstein. With the opening of a second line to Frankfurt (the Limburg Railway extension to Frankfurt Hauptbahnhof in 1888), the number of lines connecting to Höchst station increased to six, with three from the east and three from the west. On 1 September 1905, the Bäder curve was opened from Rödelheim on the Homburg line. The Bäder curve was initially used only by freight trains. Its passenger services began in 1908, including a Berlin–Wiesbaden express via Bad Nauheim and Bad Homburg.

The current Höchst station building was opened in 1914.

== Current station ==
Höchst station would be sufficient, with its twelve platform tracks, for a city. In fact, only eight tracks are used regularly, since one platform is closed completely. The entrance hall, the design of which is influenced by Art Nouveau, is run-down.

== Services ==
- RE 20 Frankfurt Hbf – Frankfurt-Höchst – Niedernhausen – Limburg (Lahn)
- RB 10 Frankfurt Hbf – Frankfurt-Höchst – Wiesbaden Hbf – Rüdesheim – Koblenz Hbf - Neuwied
- RB 11 Frankfurt Höchst – Bad Soden
- RB 12 Frankfurt Hbf – Frankfurt-Höchst– Kelkheim – Königstein
- RB 22 Frankfurt Hbf – Frankfurt-Höchst – Niedernhausen – Limburg (Lahn)
- Wiesbaden Hbf – Frankfurt-Höchst – Frankfurt Hbf (tief) – Rödermark-Ober-Roden
- Niedernhausen – Frankfurt-Höchst – Frankfurt Hbf (tief) – Dietzenbach Bf

The station is served by line S 1 and S 2 of the Rhine-Main S-Bahn, operating during the day at 30-minute intervals, together providing service every 15 minutes between Frankfurt-Höchst and central Frankfurt.

It is also served by RB (Regionalbahn) 12 services on the Königstein Railway between Königstein and Frankfurt Hbf, operated by Regionalverkehre Start Deutschland (HLB) every 30 minutes. The Soden line is served by RB 11 services operated by Regionalverkehre Start Deutschland at hourly intervals between Frankfurt-Höchst and Bad Soden.

The station is served by the RB 10 service between Frankfurt Hbf and Neuwied every hour, operated by VIAS.

It is served by RE 20 and RB 22 services between Frankfurt Hbf and Limburg every hour, together providing a service every 30 minutes.

=== Use of tracks and platforms ===
- Platform tracks 1/2: S-Bahn lines towards central Frankfurt, Regional-Express and Regionalbahn services from Limburg to Frankfurt
- Platform tracks 3/4: S-Bahn services towards Wiesbaden/Niedernhausen (track 3)
- Platform tracks 5/6: Regionalbahn services from and to Wiesbaden/Koblenz/Neuwied
- Platform tracks 8/9: access to the cleaning facilities for Intercity-Express trains
- Platform tracks 10/11: Regional-Express and Regionalbahn services to Limburg (track 10), Soden line (track 11) (HLB)
- Platform tracks 12/13: Königstein Railway to Königstein (track 13) and Frankfurt Hauptbahnhof (track12) (HLB)
