= Dietzenbach station =

Railway station in Dietzenbach, Germany

Dietzenbach Bf
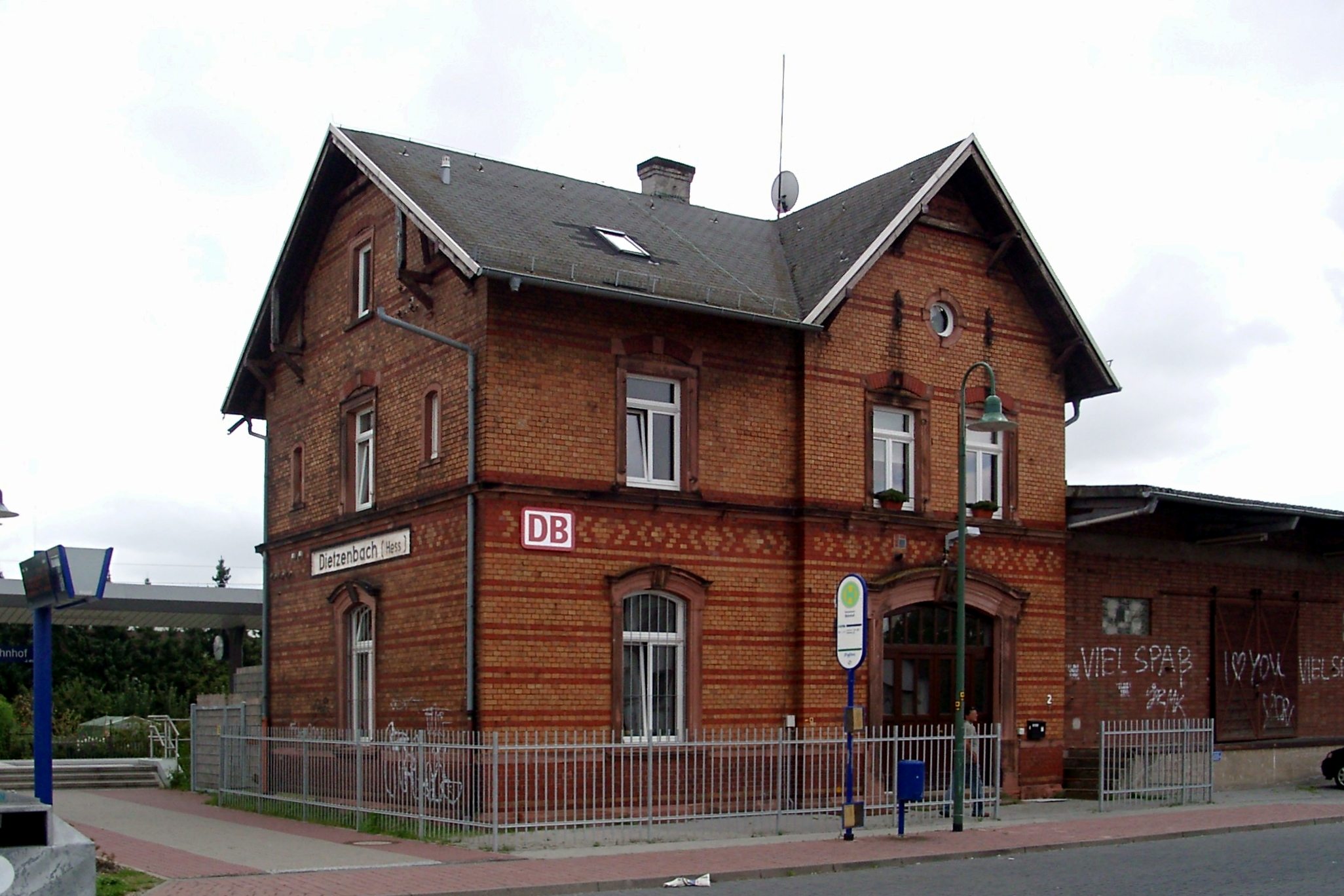

General information
- Location: Eisenbahnstr. 6, Dietzenbach, Hesse; Germany
- Coordinates: 50°00′29″N 8°47′07″E
- Line: Offenbach-Bieber–Dietzenbach railway (km 13.8)
- Platforms: 1

Construction
- Accessible: Yes

Other information
- Station code: 7166
- DS100 code: FDZ
- IBNR: 8001456
- Category: 5
- Fare zone: : 3550
- Website: www.bahnhof.de

History
- Opened: 1 December 1898
- Former names: Dietzenbach (Hesse)

Services
Preceding station	Rhine-Main S-Bahn	Following station
Dietzenbach-Mitte towards Niedernhausen	S2 (Rhine-Main S-Bahn)	Terminus
Location

Dietzenbach station (Dietzenbach Bahnhof) is the terminus of the Offenbach-Bieber–Dietzenbach railway in the German state of Hesse. The station is now used exclusively by line S2 of the Rhine-Main S-Bahn. The entrance building is protected as a monument. The station is classified by Deutsche Bahn as a category 5 station.

== History ==
Dietzenbach station was established on 1 December 1898 together with the opening of the Offenbach-Bieber–Dietzenbach railway, a branch line of the Rodgau Railway (German: Rodgaubahn). From the beginning all passenger services on the line started here. Labourers and craftsmen used the line to commute to their jobs in Offenbach am Main and Frankfurt and local farmers benefited from having faster transportation to the markets of the major cities.

Traffic to Dietzenbach flourished in the period after the Second World War. In 1959 there were still 25 daily trains to Offenbach, but in 1978 there were only five. On 18 June 1982, passenger services were closed to Dietzenbach; this was followed a few years later by the abandonment of express freight and baggage traffic. The tracks were retained and preserved.

From the 2003/2004 timetable, introduced on 14 December 2003, the station, which until then had been called Dietzenbach (Hess), became part of line S2 (Niedernhausen–Dietzenbach) of the Rhine-Main S-Bahn. The station had been modified to give barrier-free access for the disabled. The station is now the starting point for trains to Niedernhausen via the Offenbach and Frankfurt city tunnels, Höchst and Hofheim.

== Infrastructure ==
The station building is a listed building built in 1898 of brick with the roof sloping towards the platform, at the southern end on both sides there is an avant-corps. These are connected by a continuous ridge line and have triangular gables. Connected to it is a flat-roofed freight shed with a covered ramp. The building is now privately owned.

The station has a barrier-free "home" platform next to station building and the single-track line ends to the south at a buffer stop near Max-Planck-Straße. The other tracks were dismantled during the reconstruction for the S-Bahn.

== Operations ==
=== Rail ===
The S-Bahn trains run every 30 minutes. During peak hours trains run at 15-minute intervals.

=== Bus ===
The municipal bus line OF-57 runs from Dietzenbach station to Dietzenbach-Mitte station, occasionally as far as Dietzenbach-Steinberg station.

== Expansion plans ==
Since the beginning of operations there have been plans to extend the line past Dietzenbach. In 1906 and again after 1913 there was talk of an extension to Messel, but due to the First World War, these plans came to nothing.

After the beginning of S-Bahn operations in 2003 there was consideration of extending the railway line and S-Bahn operations to Rödermark-Urberach station where it would have connected with the Dreieich Railway (Dreieichbahn), running between Dreieich-Buchschlag and Rödermark-Ober Roden station. This project failed because it was found to be not economically justifiable and so Dietzenbach remains the terminus of the line.
