= Offenbach-Bieber–Dietzenbach railway =

Railway in Hesse, Germany

Offenbach-Bieber–Dietzenbach
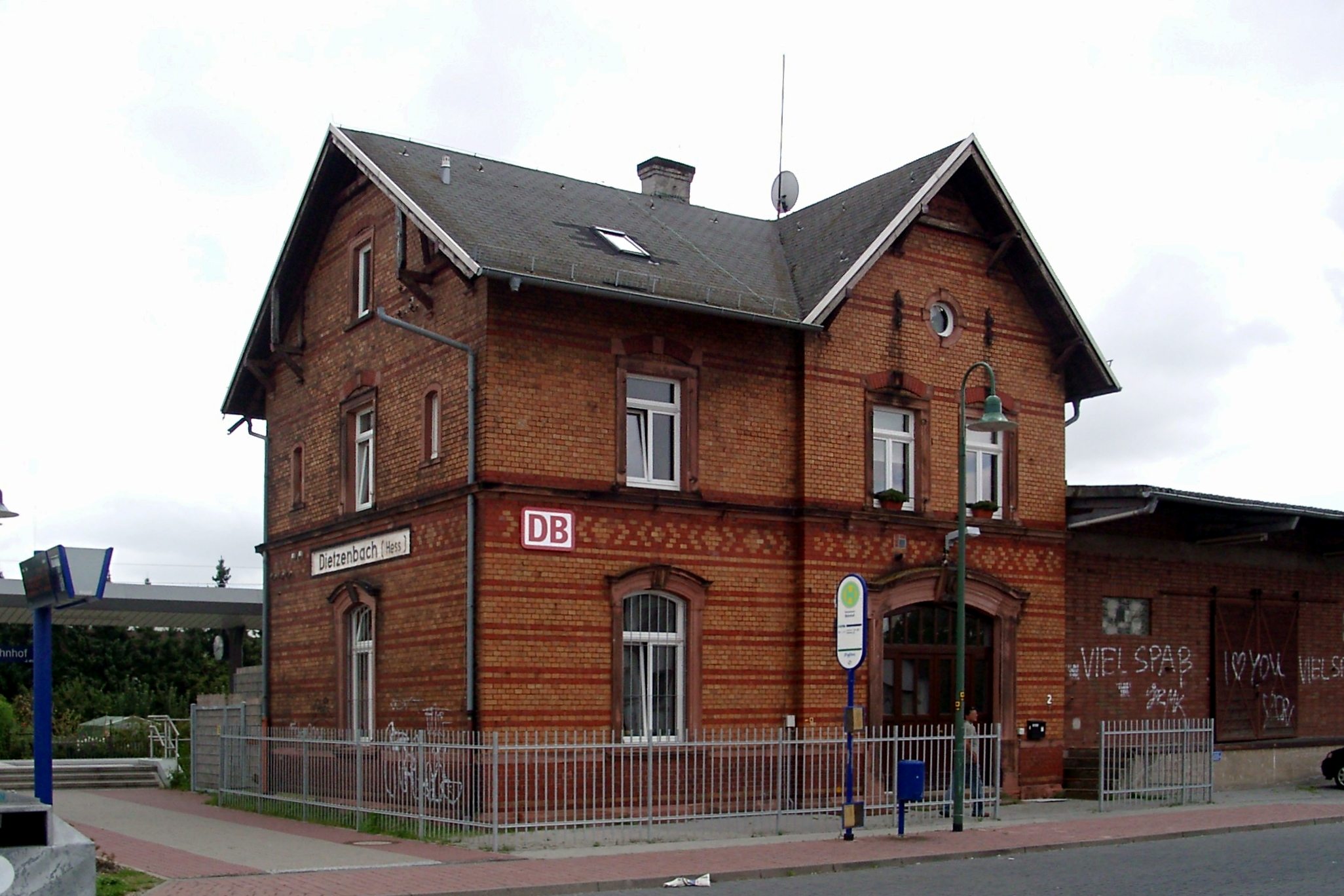
- Dietzenbach station

Overview
- Line number: 3662
- Locale: Hesse, Germany

Service
- Route number: 645.2

Technical
- Line length: 9.6 km (6.0 mi)
- Number of tracks: 2 (Offenbach-Bieber–Dietzenbach Mitte)
- Track gauge: 1,435 mm (4 ft 8 1/2 in) standard gauge
- Minimum radius: 300 m (980 ft)
- Electrification: 15 kV/16.7 Hz AC overhead catenary
- Operating speed: 120 km/h (75 mph)
- Maximum incline: 1.5%

The Offenbach-Bieber–Dietzenbach railway branches in Offenbach-Bieber station from the Rodgau Railway (German: Rodgaubahn) and runs via Heusenstamm to Dietzenbach in the German state of Hesse. The line is integrated into the Frankfurt S-Bahn network. It is served by line S 2.

== History ==
The Offenbach-Bieber–Dietzenbach line was opened on 1 December 1898, following the opening of the Rodgau Railway in 1896. It was the result of continuing efforts at the local level since about 1870 to open up the area south of Offenbach am Main with a railway, but which was only adopted by the Grand Duchy of Hesse very slowly. So it took until 1888 for the government to finally give its approval and it took another ten years until the first train ran.

The first trains were steam hauled; after the Second World War trains were increasingly hauled by diesel locomotives. The importance of the connection lay in the growing commuter traffic from the district of Offenbach, especially for those working in the leather goods industry in Offenbach.

On 18 June 1982, passenger services were closed to Dietzenbach.

=== Reconstruction for S-Bahn operations ===
The establishment of an S-Bahn operation on the track was considered in the late 1950s. It was not, however, until 23 March 2001 that the line to Dietzenbach began to be reconstructed as a double-track electrified line of the Frankfurt S-Bahn network. A proposed extension of the line to Rödermark-Ober Roden via Rödermark-Urberach failed as it was found not to be economically justified. The last kilometre between Dietzenbach Mitte and Dietzenbach stations was built as a single track. The last station is near Spessartviertel (Spessart quarter, formerly called Starkenburgring), an area of high-rise residences. As a result of some incidents, the ceramic insulators on the catenary masts on the line near the housing were protected with bullet-proof metal plates.

S-Bahn operations began on line S 2 (Niedernhausen–Dietzenbach) at the beginning of the 2003/2004 timetable on 14 December 2003. The line is operated by DB Regio as part of the Rhine-Main S-Bahn network. After the conversion of the line for S-Bahn operations there remained only one siding on the line; it is in Dietzenbach-Steinberg and is used by a fruit wholesaler.
