= Hofheim (Taunus) station =

Railway station in Hofheim am Taunus, Germany

Hofheim (Taunus)
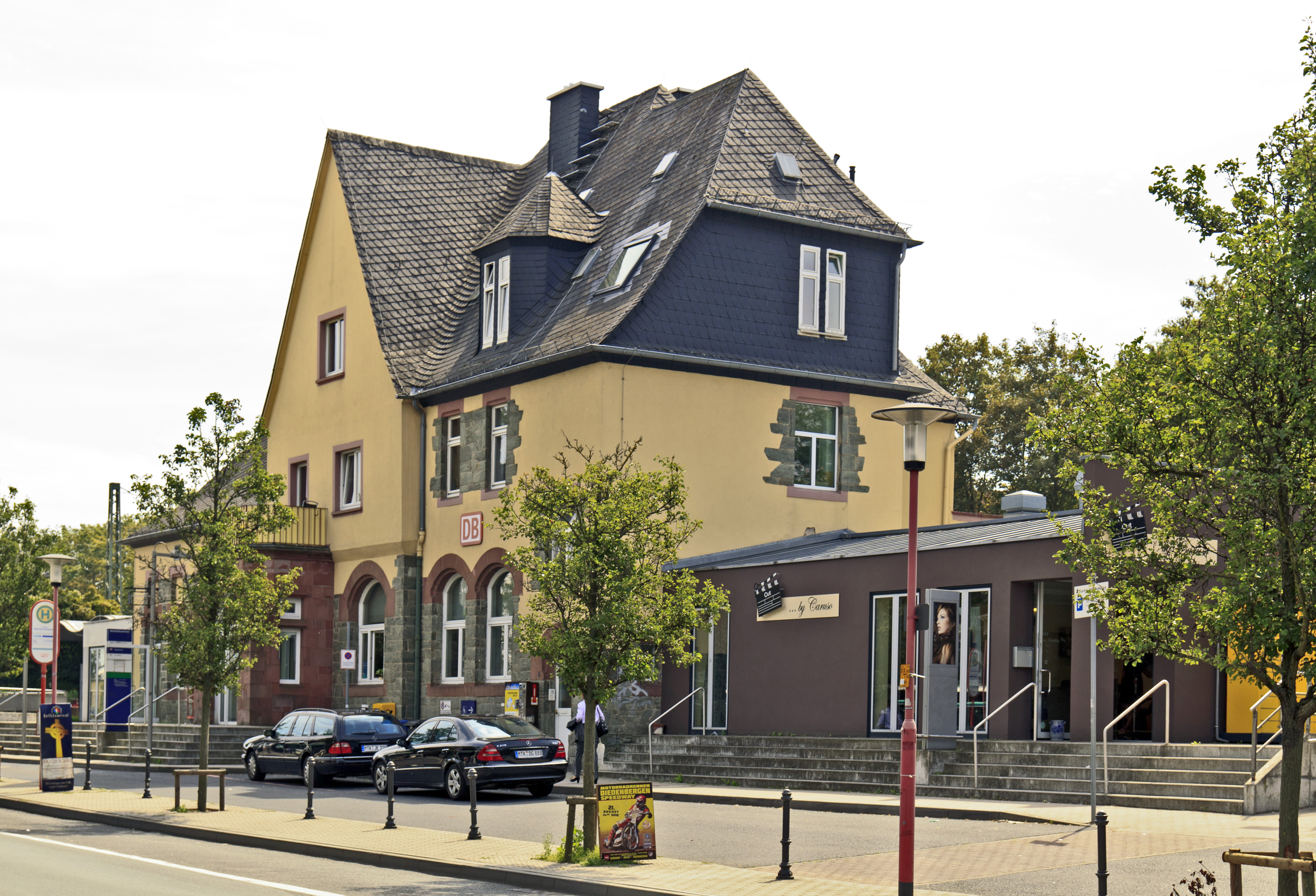
- Hofheim station, streetside

General information
- Location: Hattersheimer Str. 6, Hofheim am Taunus, Hesse; Germany
- Coordinates: 50°05′04″N 8°26′40″E
- Owner: DB Netz
- Operator: DB Station&Service
- Lines: Main-Lahn Railway (KBS 627/645.2
- Platforms: 3
- Train operators: DB Regio Mitte; S-Bahn Rhein-Main

Construction
- Accessible: Yes

Other information
- Station code: 2827
- DS100 code: FHF
- IBNR: 8002935
- Category: 4
- Fare zone: : 6601
- Website: www.bahnhof.de

History
- Opened: 15 October 1877

Services
Preceding station	DB Regio Mitte	Following station
Niedernhausen towards Limburg (Lahn)	RE 20	Frankfurt-Höchst towards Frankfurt (Main) Hbf
Niedernhausen towards Limburg (Lahn)	RB 22	Frankfurt-Höchst towards Frankfurt (Main) Hbf
Preceding station	Rhine-Main S-Bahn	Following station
Lorsbach towards Niedernhausen	S2 (Rhine-Main S-Bahn)	Kriftel towards Dietzenbach
Location
- Location within Hesse

Hofheim (Taunus) station is a station in the city of Hofheim in the German state of Hesse on the Main-Lahn Railway. The station opened on 15 November 1877, and is served by line S2 of the Rhine-Main S-Bahn and regional services operated by Deutsche Bahn. It is classified by Deutsche Bahn as a category 4 station.

== Location ==
The station is located on the boundary between the town’s centre and the district of Marxheim on Marxheimer Weg about one kilometre from the centre of the town. It is on the Main-Lahn Railway (German: Main-Lahn-Bahn), which connects the regional station of Limburg (Lahn) with Frankfurt Central Station.

== Entrance building ==
The station building was built in 1906 and has three storeys. It was built in the Heimatschutzstil (“homeland defence style”) in a pragmatic baroque form. It is a stucco building with striking embossing in Taunus quartzite of its lower storey and on the outsides of its upper widow jambs. It is classified as a monument under the Hessian Heritage Act.

== Operations ==
Fares at Hofheim station are set by the Rhein-Main-Verkehrsverbund (Rhine-Main Transport Association, RMV). The headquarters of the RMV is near the station. The station is served by trains operated by the Rhine-Main S-Bahn and DB Regio.

=== Rail ===
The station is served by S-Bahn line S2, which runs between Niedernhausen and Dietzenbach. It operates on weekdays at 30-minute intervals, at 15-minute intervals during peak hours and hourly on weekends. It is also served by RE 20 Regional-Express and RB 22 Regionalbahn services on the route from Limburg via Bad Camberg, Idstein and Niedernhausen to Frankfurt Central Station. During peak times there are six connections every hour between Hofheim and Frankfurt.

=== Buses ===
At the station there is a large bus station, from which bus routes run to the Hofheim suburbs and the surrounding communities. Called shared taxis also operate from the bus station. There are also direct bus services to Wiesbaden, operating three times an hour during the daytime.
