= Offenbach (Main) Hauptbahnhof =

Railway station in Hesse, Germany

Offenbach (Main) Hbf
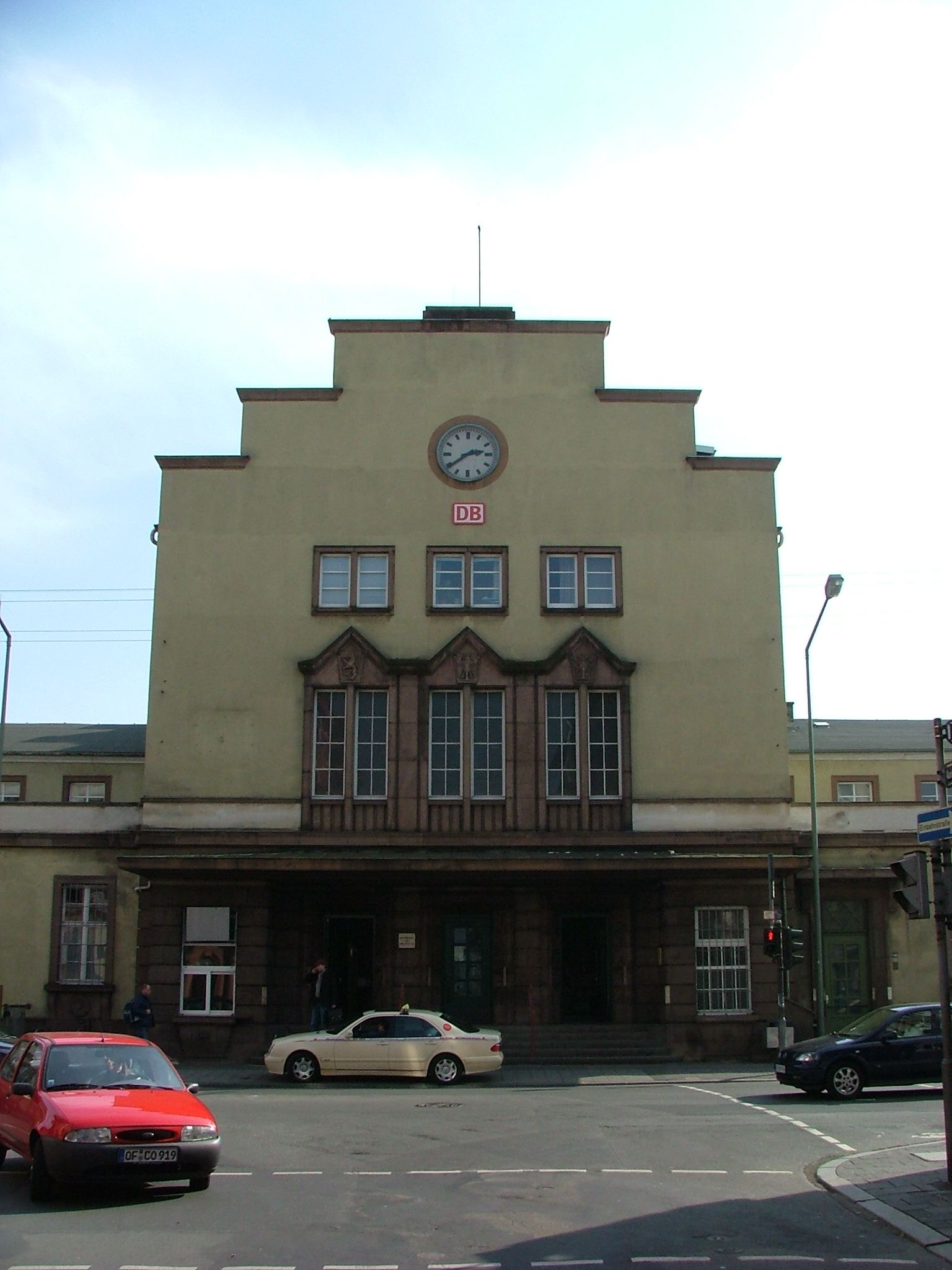

General information
- Location: Bismarckstr. 146, Offenbach am Main, Hesse; Germany
- Coordinates: 50°5′58″N 8°45′39″E
- Lines: Frankfurt–Hanau (south Main) (10.1, KBS 615, KBS 641 km); Offenbach–Dieburg–Reinheim (0.0 km)
- Platforms: 6

Construction
- Accessible: No
- Architect: De la Sauce and Schenk
- Architectural style: Renaissance Revival

Other information
- Station code: 4742
- DS100 code: FO
- IBNR: 8000349
- Category: 4
- Fare zone: : 3601
- Website: www.bahnhof.de

History
- Opened: 1873

Services
Preceding station	DB Regio Mitte	Following station
Frankfurt South towards Frankfurt (Main) Hbf	RE 50	Hanau Hbf towards Bebra
Hanau Hbf towards Frankfurt (Main) Hbf	RB 51	Hanau Hbf towards Wächtersbach
Preceding station	DB Regio Bayern	Following station
Hanau Hbf towards Frankfurt (Main) Hbf	RE 55	Hanau Hbf towards Würzburg Hbf
Preceding station	VIAS	Following station
Frankfurt South towards Frankfurt (Main) Hbf	RE 85	Hanau Hbf towards Groß-Umstadt-Wiebelsbach
Location

Offenbach am Main Hauptbahnhof is a railway station serving the German city of Offenbach am Main. It is located on the Frankfurt–Göttingen railway between Frankfurt and Hanau on the south bank of the Main. It is also the starting point of the Rodgau Railway, via Obertshausen, Rodgau and Ober-Roden to Dieburg (originally to Reinheim).

== History ==
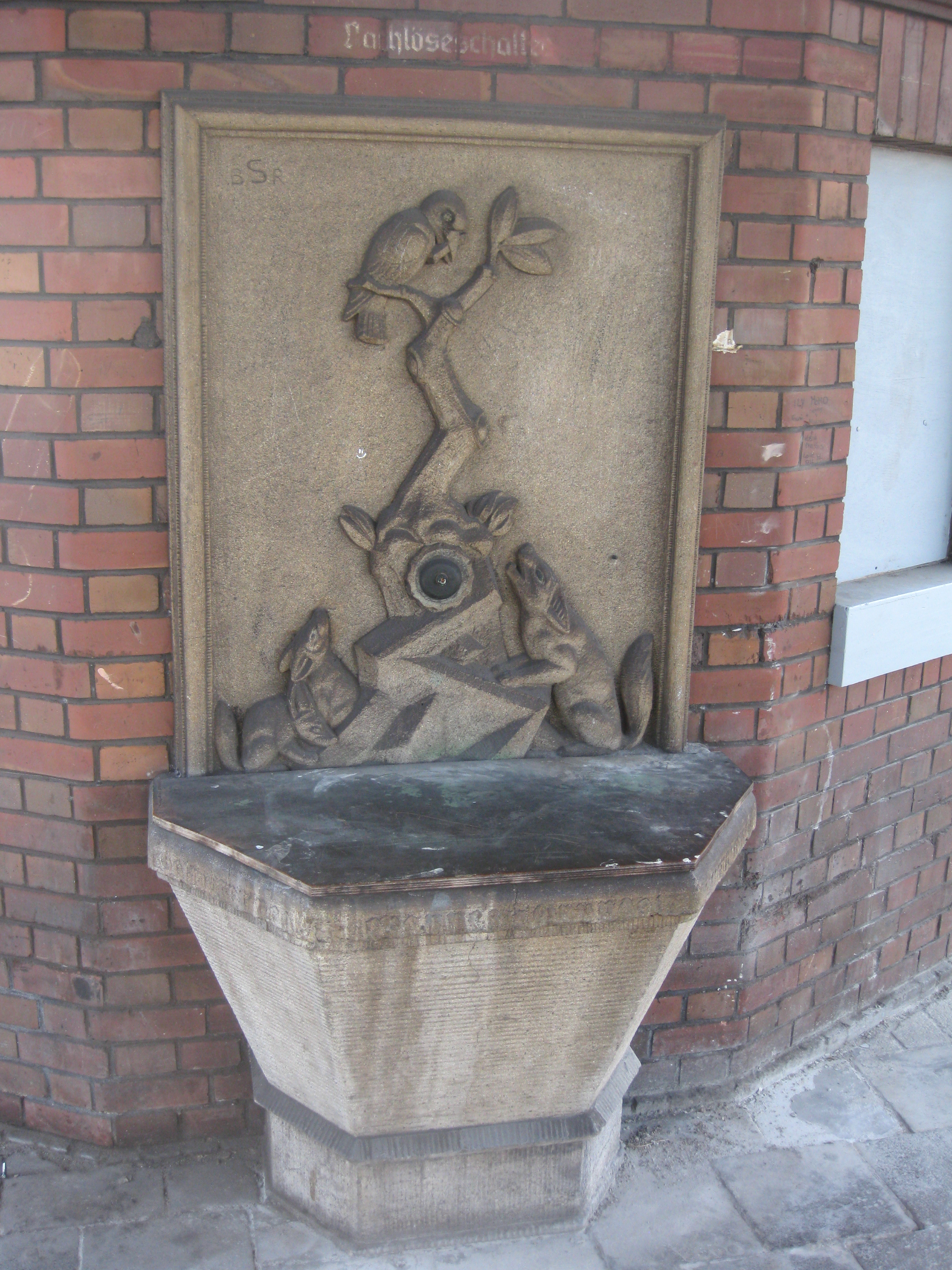
Vogelbrunnen ("bird fountain") by Bruno Schäfer

The station was built from 1872 to 1873 during the construction of the Frankfurt–Bebra railway and was given an entrance building in Renaissance Revival style. It was commissioned by the Königliche Eisenbahndirektion (Royal Railway Division) of Frankfurt. Because of the development of the city around the line which was originally laid on the same level as the roads, the railway was put on an embankment between 1912 and 1926 so that the increasing road traffic could run under it. This forced the rail track field to be elevated. A new station building was out of the question because of the depressed economic conditions. The entrance building was radically restructured in the 1920s with a "conservative-traditionalist” appearance. The entrance building is listed as a monument under the Hessian Monument Protection Act. There is a fountain by Bruno Schaefer called Vogelbrunnen ("bird fountain") on the platform between tracks 1 and 2.

== Significance ==
The station has had no Deutsche Bahn long-distance services since December 2016, although it has been served by FlixTrain since 2022.

The opening of a line of the Rhine-Main S-Bahn through Offenbach in 1995 greatly reduced the station's importance. The new line runs in a tunnel under central Offenbach and bypasses the Hauptbahnhof. On its western side it partly uses the route of the former Frankfurt-Offenbach Local Railway (Frankfurt-Offenbach Lokalbahn). After Deutsche Bahn had stopped investing in the station building for some time, the ticket office was closed in January 2011, so that Offenbach Hauptbahnhof no longer has any rail staff.

== Services ==
The following services stopped at the station in 2024:

Line	Route	Interval
FLX 11	Mainz – Frankfurt-Flughafen – Frankfurt-Süd – Offenbach (Main) – Hanau – Fulda – Kassel-Wilhelmshöhe – Göttingen – Hannover Messe/Latzen – Wolfsburg – Berlin-Spandau – Berlin	3 times a week
RE 50	Fulda – Wächtersbach – Gelnhausen – Hanau Hbf – Offenbach (Main) Hbf – Frankfurt (Main) Hbf	Hourly (extra trains in peak)
RB 51	Wächtersbach – Gelnhausen – Langenselbold – Hanau Hbf – Offenbach (Main) Hbf – Frankfurt (Main) Hbf	Hourly (20/40 mins in peak)
RE 55	(Bamberg Hbf –) Würzburg Hbf – Aschaffenburg Hbf – Hanau Hbf – Offenbach (Main) Hbf – Frankfurt (Main) Hbf	2 hourly (extra trains in peak, some to/from Bamberg)
RE 85	(Erbach (Odenw) –) Groß-Umstadt Wiebelsbach – Babenhausen (Hess) –) Seligenstadt (Hess) – Hanau Hbf – Offenbach (Main) Hbf – Frankfurt (Main) Hbf	Hourly (2 hourly to/from Erbach)

Views of the station

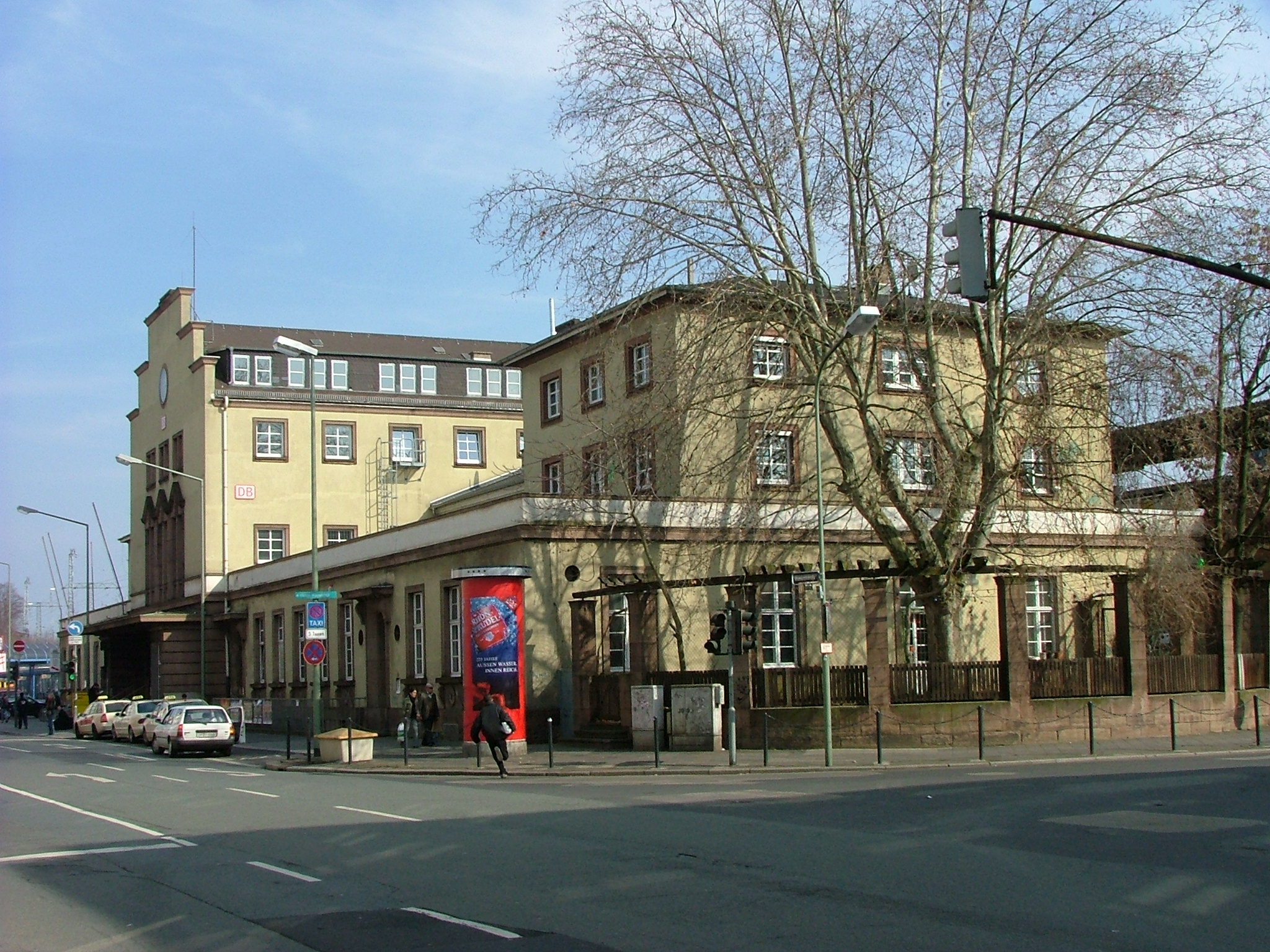
Main entrance

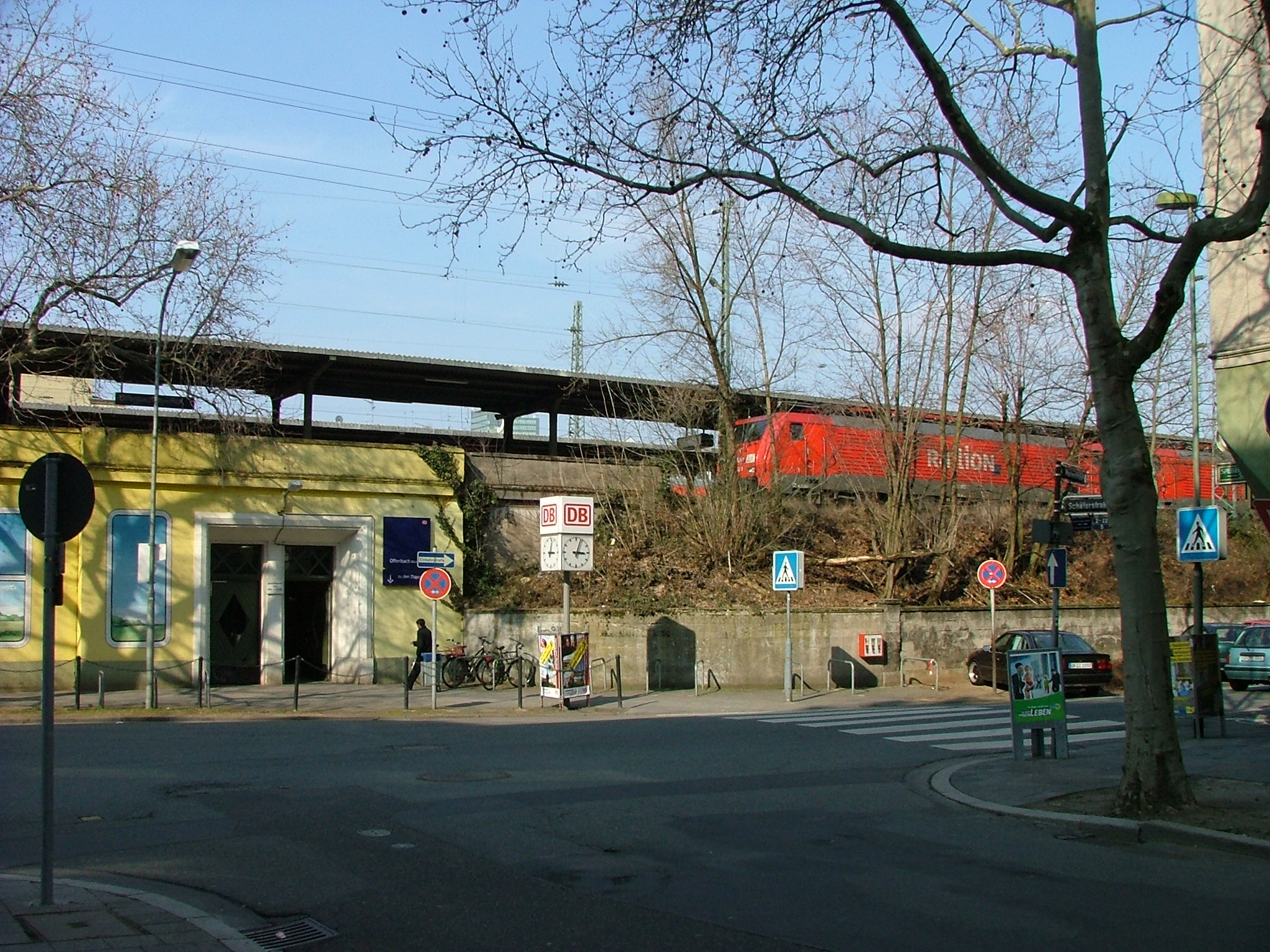
South side

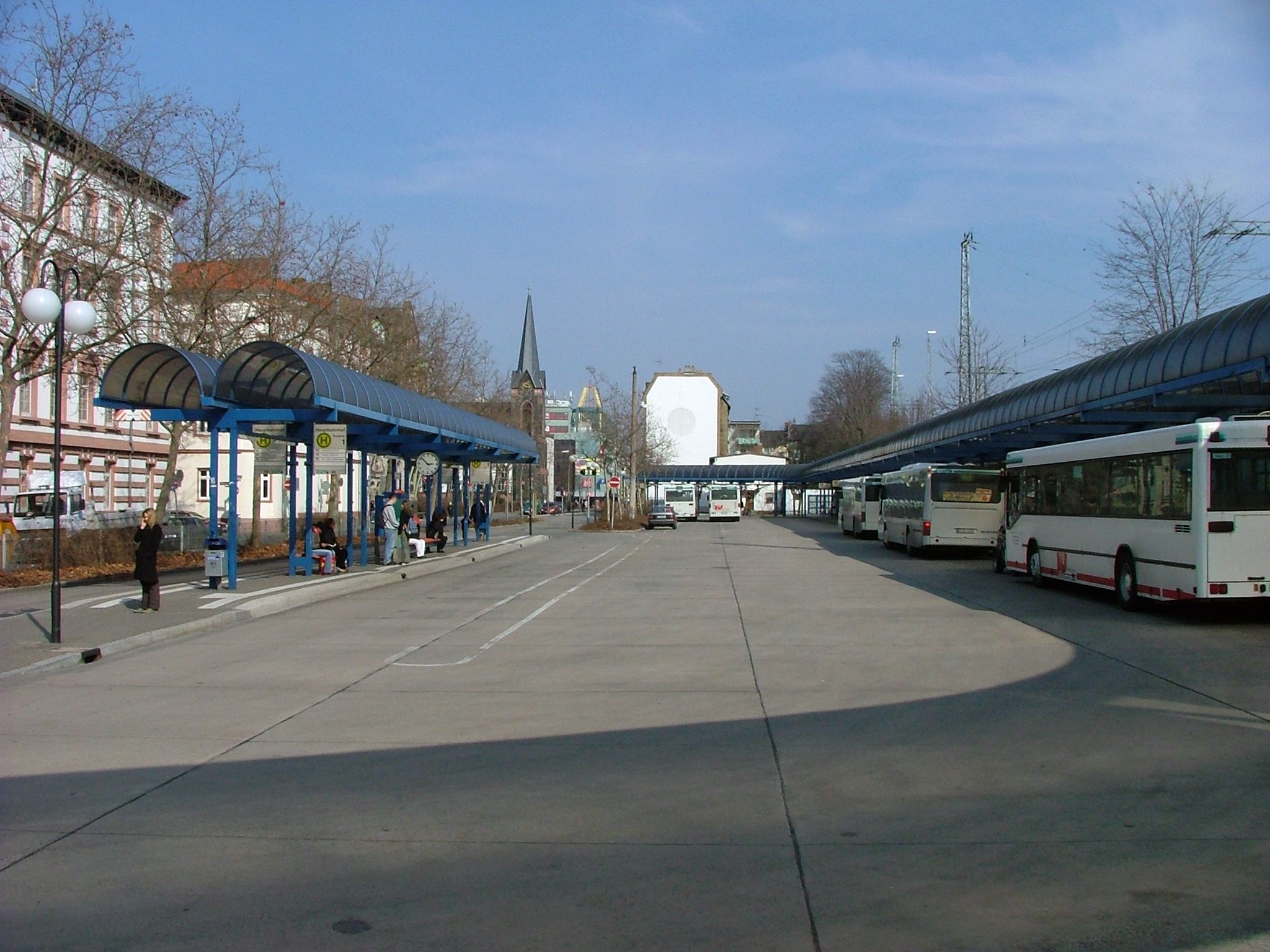
View from the station towards the bus station on Bismarckstraße

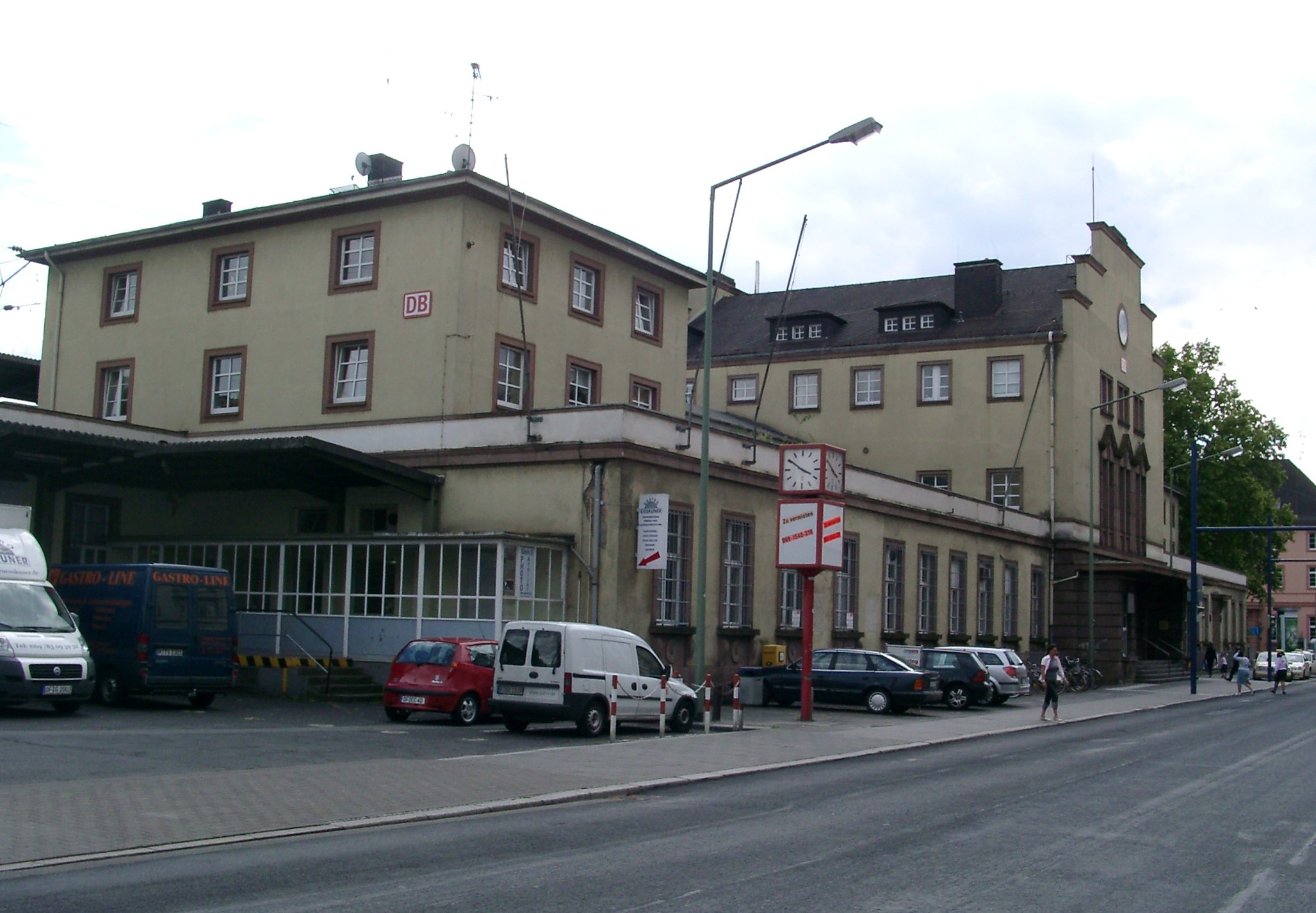
The station from the bus station
