= Niedernhausen station =

Railway station in Hesse, Germany

Niedernhausen (Taunus)
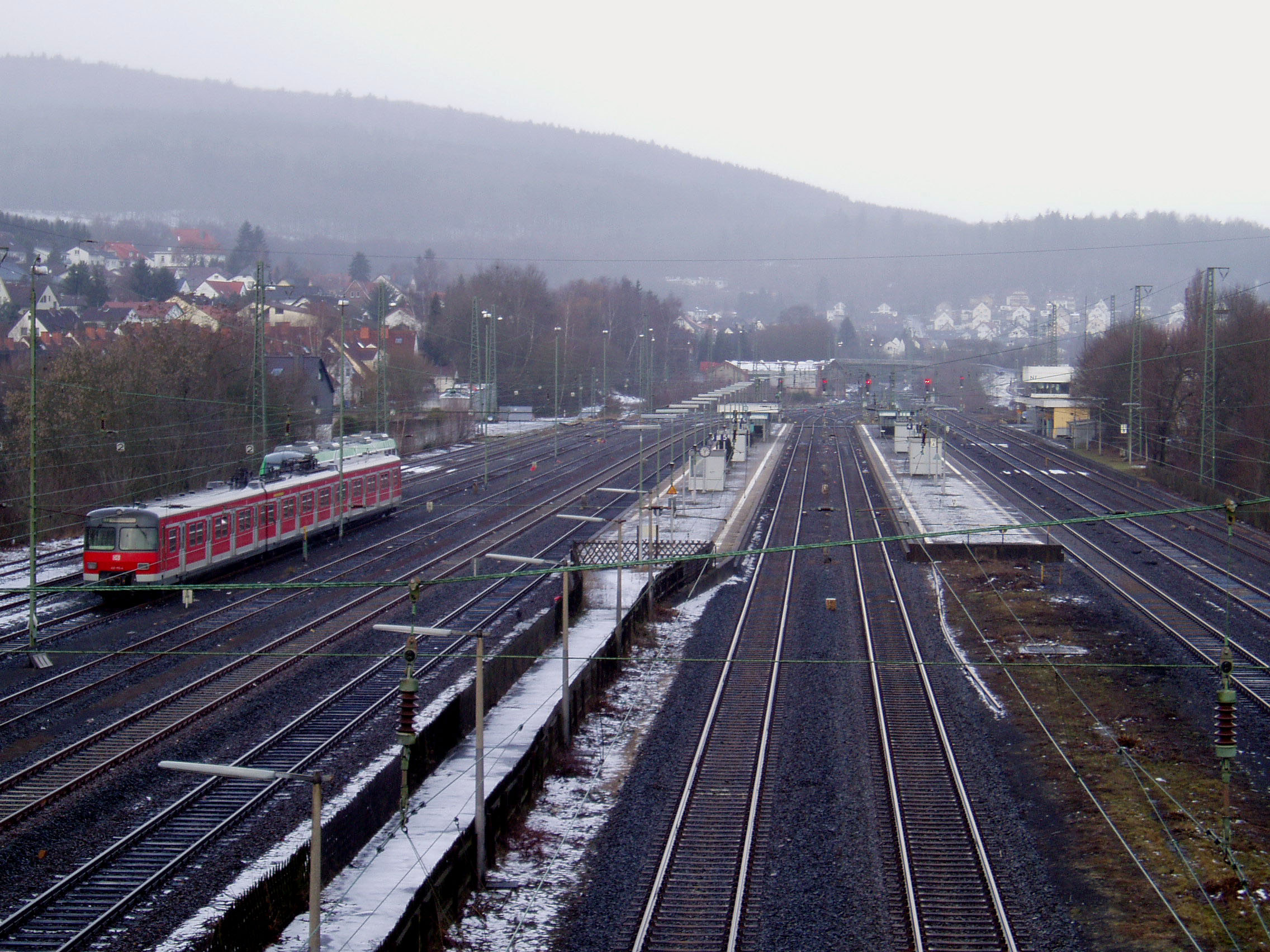
- 2006

General information
- Location: Bahnhofstr.37, Niedernhausen, Hesse; Germany
- Coordinates: 50°9′35″N 8°18′46″E
- Owner: DB Netz
- Operator: DB Station&Service
- Lines: Main-Lahn Railway (KBS 645.2/627; Ländches Railway (KBS 627)
- Platforms: 2 island platforms 1 side platform
- Tracks: 5
- Train operators: DB Regio Mitte; Hessische Landesbahn; S-Bahn Rhein-Main

Construction
- Accessible: Yes

Other information
- Station code: 4513
- DS100 code: FNSD
- IBNR: 8004400
- Category: 4
- Fare zone: : 6475
- Website: www.bahnhof.de

History
- Opened: 1877

Services
Preceding station	DB Regio Mitte	Following station
Idstein towards Limburg (Lahn)	RE 20	Hofheim towards Frankfurt (Main) Hbf
Idstein towards Limburg (Lahn)	RB 22	Hofheim towards Frankfurt (Main) Hbf
Preceding station	Hessische Landesbahn	Following station
Idstein towards Limburg (Lahn)	RB 21	Auringen-Medenbach towards Wiesbaden Hbf
Preceding station	Rhine-Main S-Bahn	Following station
Terminus	S2 (Rhine-Main S-Bahn)	Niederjosbach towards Dietzenbach
Location
- Location within Hesse

Niedernhausen station serves the municipality of Niedernhausen in the German state of Hesse. It is the most important station on the Main-Lahn Railway between the stations of Frankfurt-Höchst and Eschhofen in Limburg an der Lahn. It is the terminus of the Ländches Railway running from Niedernhausen to Wiesbaden Hauptbahnhof and of line S2 of the Rhine-Main S-Bahn from Frankfurt.

== History ==
Niedernhausen station was opened by the Hessian Ludwig Railway (German: Hessische Ludwigsbahn) with the Main-Lahn Railway (Main-Lahn-Bahn) from Frankfurt to Limburg in 1877. The last section of the route between Frankfurt-Höchst and Idstein was opened on 15 October 1877. This completed the link between the Rhine-Main area and the Limburg Basin. With the opening of the Ländches Railway (Ländchesbahn) between Niedernhausen and Wiesbaden in 1879, Niedernhausen became the main station between Höchst and Eschhofen in Limburg, where the Main-Lahn Railway connects with the Lahn Valley Railway. As a railway junction station Niedernhausen received a roundhouse (now converted into six loft apartments) with a turntable, a water tower, a coal bunker and sidings for the operation of steam locomotives. The engine shed and water tower now have heritage protection. The first station building was built in 1880. It was replaced on 1 January 1906 by a prestigious new building. The station was instrumental in the revival of the small town and its neighboring communities. From the turn of the century, Niedernhausen became a health resort as its spa guests could now easily arrive by train. In 1913, with the construction of the second track, the level crossing to the neighbouring community of Königshofen was replaced by a modern railway overbridge.

In the Second World War, the station was the target of several air attacks. The heaviest of them was on 22 February 1945, destroying the station building, large parts of the railway tracks, 30 locomotives and about a dozen parked carriages. After the war, reconstruction began. A new station building was built with an interlocking. The number of railway employees rose to 100 people. The shift of freight transport to trucks later led to the closure of freight services at the station. With the end of the steam locomotive era in October 1973, the no longer needed facilities were dismantled. On 25 August 1975, the Rhine-Main S-Bahn commenced operations and Niedernhausen was the terminus of line R2 (renamed S2 in 1978). From 1978, it ran through the new Frankfurt S-Bahn tunnel from the Frankfurt Hauptbahnhof low level to Hauptwache. In 1983, the Frankfurt S-Bahn tunnel was extended from Hauptwache to Konstablerwache and in 1990 to Frankfurt South station. In 1993, the S2 was diverted to run from Konstablerwache to Mühlberg station, before finally being extended in 2003 through a tunnel under Offenbach and connected over the Rodgau Railway to Dietzenbach. The electrification of the line to Limburg was completed in 1988. Since 2004 the Ländches Railway has been operated by vectus Verkehrsgesellschaft. The central bus station of the municipality is in front of to the station building.

During construction of the Cologne–Frankfurt high-speed line, a track ran temporarily from the station to the high-speed line. This temporary connection was used for track laying on the new line. It climbed gradients of up to 5.5 percent.

== Tracks ==
- Track 1 (home platform): not regularly used (platform height: 38 cm, platform length: 231 m)
- Track 2: former siding, mostly for freight wagons; now closed
- Track 3 (platform 3/4): Regionalbahn/ Regional-Express/Hessische Landesbahn services to Limburg an der Lahn (platform height: 76 cm, platform length: 285 m)
- Track 4 (platform 3/4): HLB services to and from Wiesbaden (platform height: 76 cm, platform length: 285 m)
- Track 5 (platform 5/6): S-Bahn line 2 towards Dietzenbach via Frankfurt-Höchst and Frankfurt Hauptbahnhof (platform height: 76 cm, platform length: 259 m)
- Track 6 (platform 5/6): Regionalbahn/Regional-Express services towards Frankfurt Hauptbahnhof; HLB services to Wiesbaden (coming from Limburg) (platform height: 76 cm, platform length: 259 m)
- Track 7: through track for freight trains from Limburg
- Tracks 8–10: sidings, used mainly by HLB and the Rhine-Main S-Bahn.
- Track 11: operationally closed and connected only by points at the southern end of the station

== Buses ==
Niedernhausen station is one of the central nodes in the Idstein area and is served by the Wiesbaden public transport and two regional bus routes:

- 22: Niedernhause-Oberjosbach–Niedernhausen–Wiesbaden-Naurod–Wiesbaden Pl. der dt. Einheit (ESWE Verkehrsgesellschaft)
- 231: Niedernhausen–Waldems-Wüstems (Rheingau-Taunus-Verkehrsgesellschaft) - This line connects the community of Waldems to the S-Bahn.
- 240: Niedernhausen–Taunusstein-Neuhof–Taunusstein-Hahn–(Wiesbaden) (RTV).
