= Wiesbaden Ost station =

Railway station in Hesse, Germany

Wiesbaden Ost
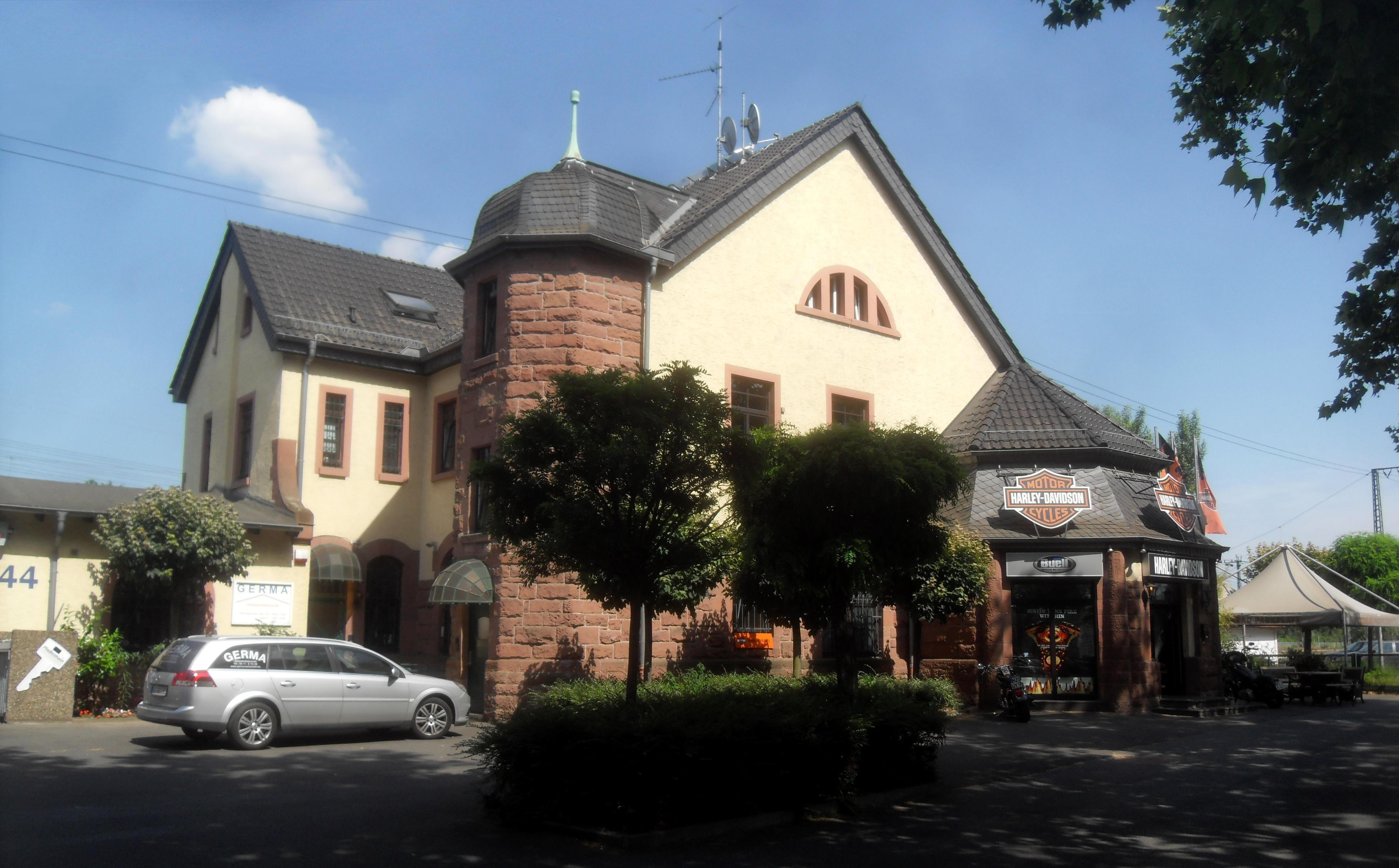
- The station forecourt and the entrance building from the Wiesbadener Landstraße

General information
- Location: Kasteler Straßen 44, Wiesbaden, Hesse; Germany
- Coordinates: 50°2′28″N 8°15′24″E
- Owner: DB Netz
- Operator: DB Station&Service
- Lines: Taunus Railway (37.8 km); Aar Valley Railway (0.0 km) (currently only freight)
- Platforms: 2
- Tracks: 4
- Train operators: S-Bahn Rhein-Main

Construction
- Accessible: Yes

Other information
- Station code: 6745
- DS100 code: FWO
- IBNR: 8006404
- Category: 4
- Fare zone: : 6501; RNN: 300 (RMV transitional tariff)
- Website: www.bahnhof.de

History
- Opened: 19 May 1840

Services
Preceding station	Rhine-Main S-Bahn	Following station
Wiesbaden Hbf Terminus	S1 (Rhine-Main S-Bahn)	Mainz-Kastel towards Rödermark-Ober Roden
Wiesbaden Hbf Terminus	S8 (Rhine-Main S-Bahn)	Mainz Nord towards Hanau Hbf
Wiesbaden Hbf Terminus	S9 (Rhine-Main S-Bahn)	Mainz-Kastel towards Hanau Hbf
Location
- Location within Hesse

Wiesbaden Ost (east) station is situated on the Frankfurt–Wiesbaden line (line number 3603; timetable section 645.1) in the German state of Hesse. It was opened as part of the Taunus Railway, which was opened in 1839/40. The station was opened as part of the last stage of construction of the line to Wiesbaden and was opened on 19 May 1840.

== History ==
Rhine and the line to the station in 1841

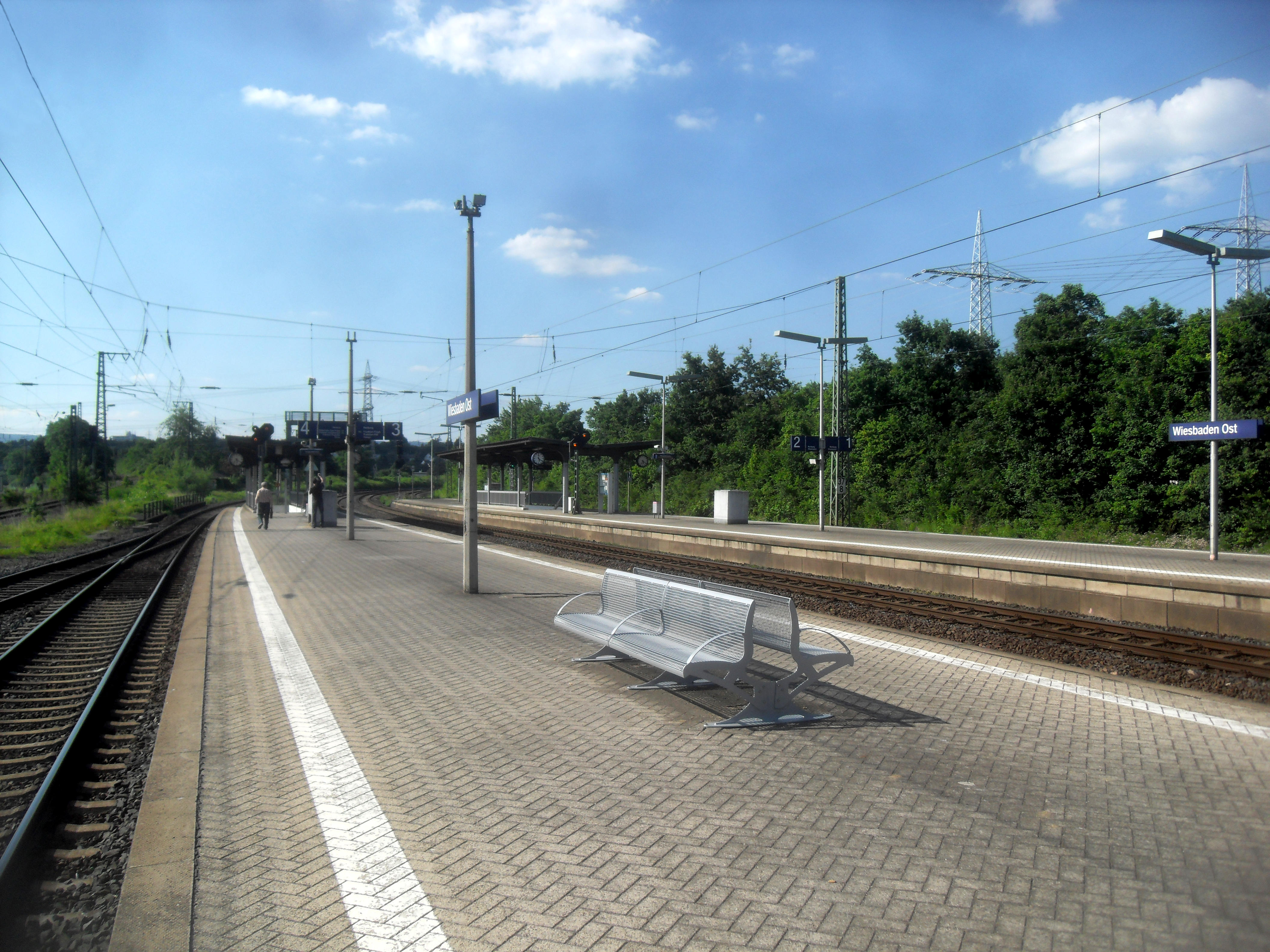
The platforms of Wiesbaden Ost station

Originally the station was called "Biebrich Curve" and it was later called "Biebrich Ost". After the incorporation of Biebrich into Wiesbaden, "Wiesbaden" was added to its name in 1927, but "Biebrich" was deleted in 1934 and only "Ost" was maintained in the station name. This led to a geographically incorrect name as the station is located in the south of Wiesbaden.

On 3 August 1840, a 1.5 kilometre spur line was opened that branched off from here to the Biebrich Rhine station in Biebrich to connect the Taunus Railway with the free port on the Rhine. The Sackbahnhof (sack station) on the Rhine shore was in the immediate vicinity of Nassau's main customs office and from 1839 allowed the immediate clearance of goods transported from Höchst am Main (the temporary rail head on the Taunus Railway) to Biebrich through customs for shipping on the Rhine. This led to a dispute in 1841 with the neighbouring Grand Duchy of Hesse (including an incident called the Nebeljungenstreich—fog prank—when Mainz merchants sabotaged the port at Biebrich), as Mainz was at a disadvantage because it lacked of a direct rail connection to Frankfurt. The railway was horse-drawn until 1872 and shut down in 1907. Part of the line is used as a siding.

From 18 September 1862 there was a connection from Curve station to the Nassau Rhine Railway of the Nassau Rhine Railway Company (Nassauische Rhein Eisenbahn-Gesellschaft), which since 1856 had run down the Rhine through the Rheingau and later connected to Oberlahnstein and Bad Ems.

The neo-baroque entrance building that was built in 1906 is now privately owned.

=== Igelstein connecting curve ===
The northwestern part of the station connects to the East Rhine Railway, which has very heavy freight train traffic. These trains run through Wiesbaden Ost on the western side of the platforms and connect to the southern tracks of the Taunus Railway towards Mainz-Kastel. The section between Wiesbaden Ost and Kostheim junction is characterized by chronic congestion, since in addition to Rhine-Main S-Bahn lines S 1 and S 9, Rhein-Main-Verkehrsverbund line 10 runs to Frankfurt Central Station. To eliminate this bottleneck, a single-track connecting curve from the former Igelstein junction on the Mainz freight bypass to the East Rhine Railway has been under construction since early 2011 under the “seaport hinterland transport emergency program” (Sofortprogramms Seehafenhinterlandverkehr). According to the tender, this involves a 1,200 m-long (3,900 ft) single-track connection, including two ground frames. The curve allows all freight trains through the district of Mainz-Kastel to run via the bypass, avoiding conflict with regional passenger services. Although, for reasons of capacity, not all freight transport will be able to use both the connecting curve and the freight bypass, a marked decrease in the current potential for conflict between freight and passenger traffic is expected. Only S-Bahn S 9 line will in future run between Kostheim junction and Mainz-Bischofsheim station, sharing the line over Kostheim bridge with freight trains.

At the beginning of 2011, decontamination began on soil in the area of the junction to Kaiser Bridge. Around this football field-sized area there was formerly a works for producing coal gas. The primary measures include the replacement and disposal of soil contaminated with chlorinated polycyclic aromatic hydrocarbons. Work on this has been largely completed by the end of the summer of 2011. The remediation of groundwater will still take several years to complete. After the completion of all work the area will be landscaped and serve as an ecological compensation area for the area taken for Igelstein curve.

As a further preparatory action, a set of points was installed in October 2011 to give freight trains access in the future to the connecting curve. The construction of the actual curve has been postponed for an indefinite time. Although the construction of the line has a valid planning approval, it is not clear when this work will be undertaken.

== Operations ==
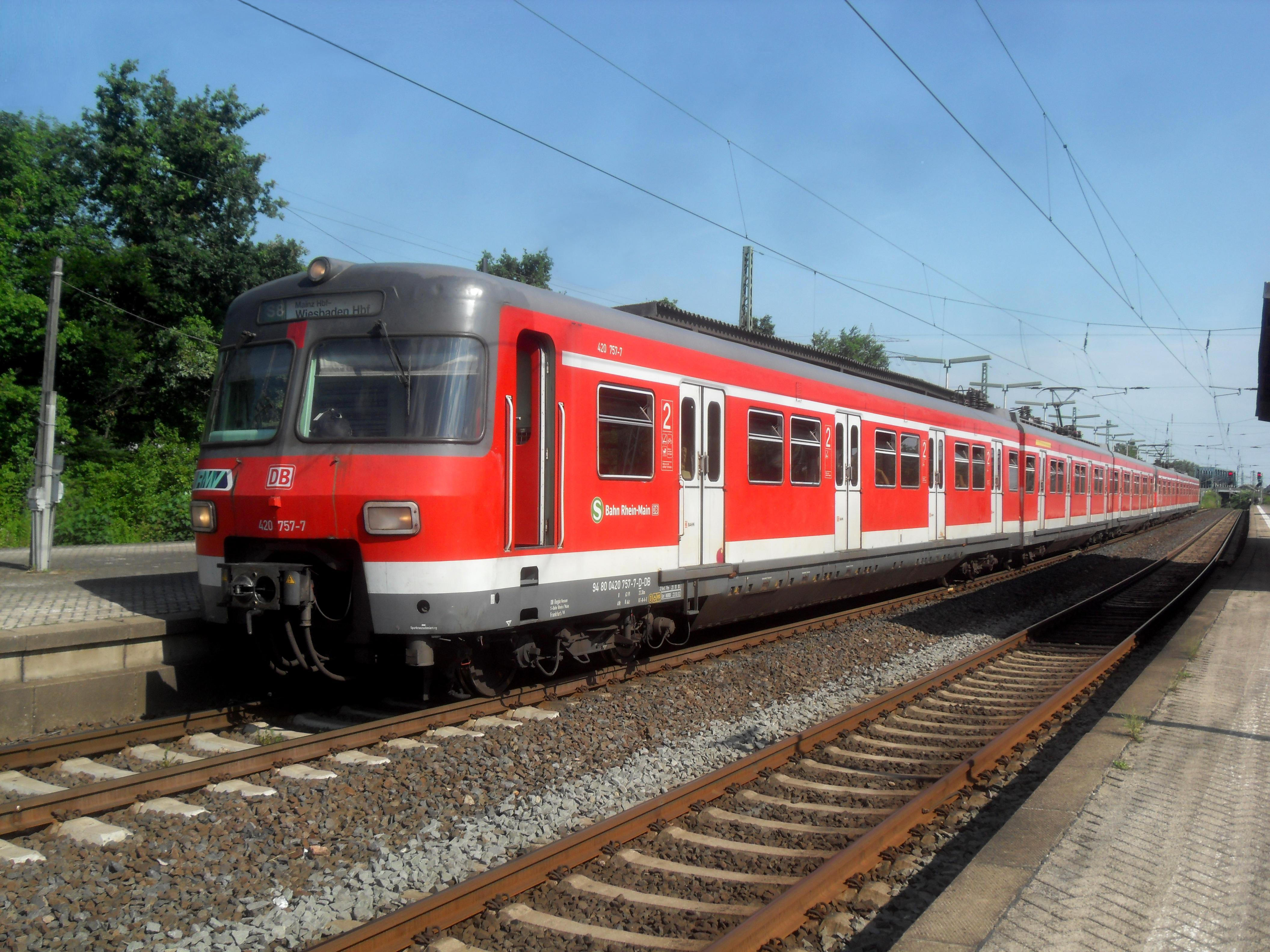
Class 420 electric multiple unit in Wiesbaden Ost station of line S8 of the Rhine-Main S-Bahn on the way to Wiesbaden Hauptbahnhof

Lines at Wiesbaden Ost

The station formerly had a freight yard with a small hump, but it had an unfavourable layout. The passenger station is a stop for the S-Bahn lines S1, S8 and S9 of the Rhein-Main-Verkehrsverbund (Rhine-Main Transport Association, RMV). The station is classified by Deutsche Bahn as a category 4 station. The station would be involved in the proposed Wiesbaden Stadtbahn, which is still in the planning stage.

=== Buses ===
The following lines of ESWE and MVG serve the station: 6, 6A, 33, 33B, 39.
