= Mainz Nord station =

Railway station in Mainz, Germany

Mainz Nord
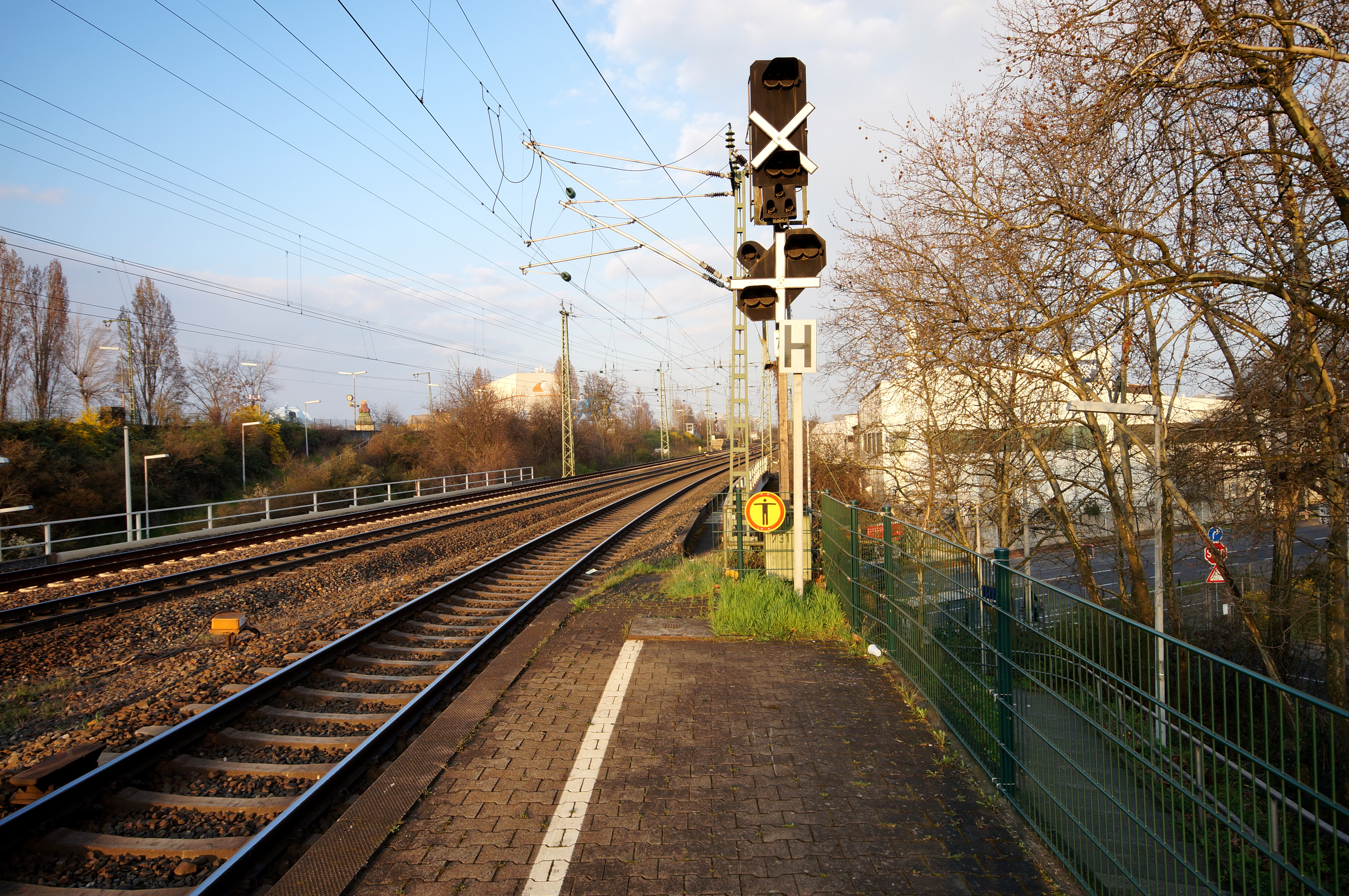
- 2014

General information
- Location: Rheinallee/An der Kaiserbrücke; 55120 Mainz-Neustadt; Rhineland-Palatinate; Germany
- Coordinates: 50.0203°N 8.2471°E
- System: Hp
- Owner: Deutsche Bahn
- Operator: DB Netz; DB Station&Service
- Lines: Mainz rail bypass (KBS 645.8)
- Platforms: 2 side platforms
- Tracks: 4
- Train operators: S-Bahn Rhein-Main
- Connections: 76

Construction
- Parking: yes
- Cycle facilities: no
- Accessible: yes

Other information
- Station code: 3899
- DS100 code: FMN
- IBNR: 8003815
- Category: 5
- Fare zone: : 6511; RNN: 300 (RMV transitional tariff)
- Website: www.bahnhof.de

Services
Preceding station	Rhine-Main S-Bahn	Following station
Wiesbaden Ost towards Wiesbaden Hbf	S8 (Rhine-Main S-Bahn)	Mainz Hbf towards Hanau Hbf
Location
- Location within Rhineland-Palatinate Location within Germany Location within Europe

Mainz Nord station (German: Haltepunkt Mainz Nord) is a railway station in the municipality of Mainz, Rhineland-Palatinate, Germany. It is adjacent to Schott AG, Römheld & Moelle and Werner & Mertz.
