= Wiesbaden-Schierstein station =

Railway station in Wiesbaden, Germany

Wiesbaden Schierstein
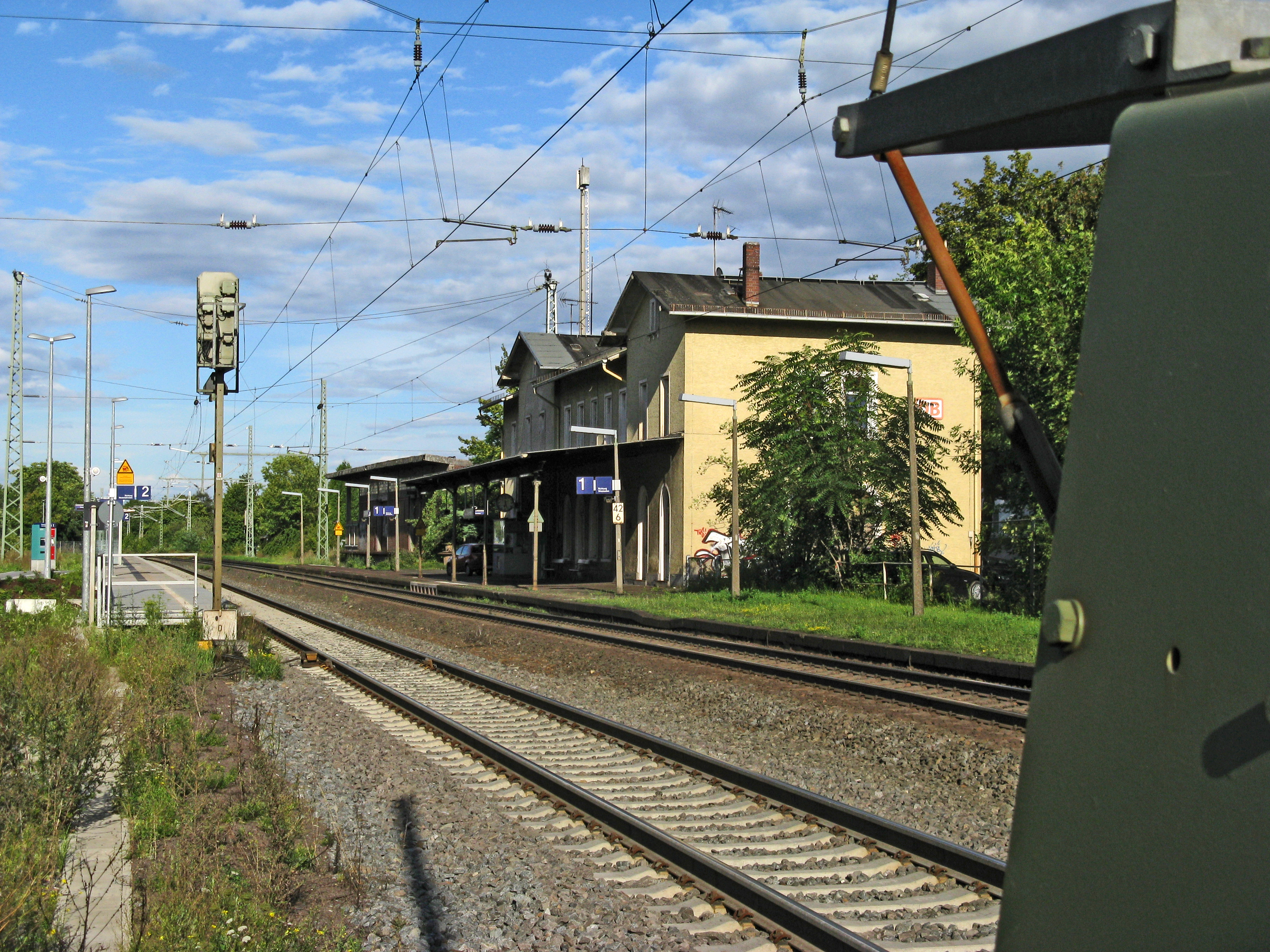

General information
- Location: Dachsberg-Str. 2, Wiesbaden, Hesse; Germany
- Coordinates: 50°02′51″N 8°11′41″E
- Owner: DB Netz
- Operator: DB Station&Service
- Line: East Rhine Railway (42.6 km)
- Platforms: 2

Other information
- Station code: 6749
- DS100 code: FWS
- IBNR: 8006409
- Category: 6
- Fare zone: : 6501; RNN: 300 (RMV transitional tariff)
- Website: www.bahnhof.de

History
- Opened: 1856

Services
Preceding station	VIAS	Following station
Niederwalluf towards Neuwied	RB 10	Wiesbaden-Biebrich towards Frankfurt (Main) Hbf
Location
- Location within Hesse

Wiesbaden-Schierstein station is a railway station in the borough of Schierstein in the Hessian state capital of Wiesbaden on the East Rhine Railway from Wiesbaden to Cologne. It is classified by Deutsche Bahn as a category 6 station. The station was opened in 1856.

== Services ==
Schierstein lies in the area served by the Rhein-Main-Verkehrsverbund (Rhine-Main Transport Association, RMV). It is used by StadtExpress trains operated by VIAS, and buses.

=== Trains ===
Regionalbahn services operate at hourly intervals on the Frankfurt Hauptbahnhof–Koblenz Hauptbahnhof route. In the peak hour an extra service reduces intervals to a half hour.

=== Buses ===
The station is also served by bus line 9, which stops at the Rathaus bus stop 200 metres away.
