= Mainz-Bischofsheim station =

Railway station in Bischofsheim, Germany

Mainz Bischofsheim
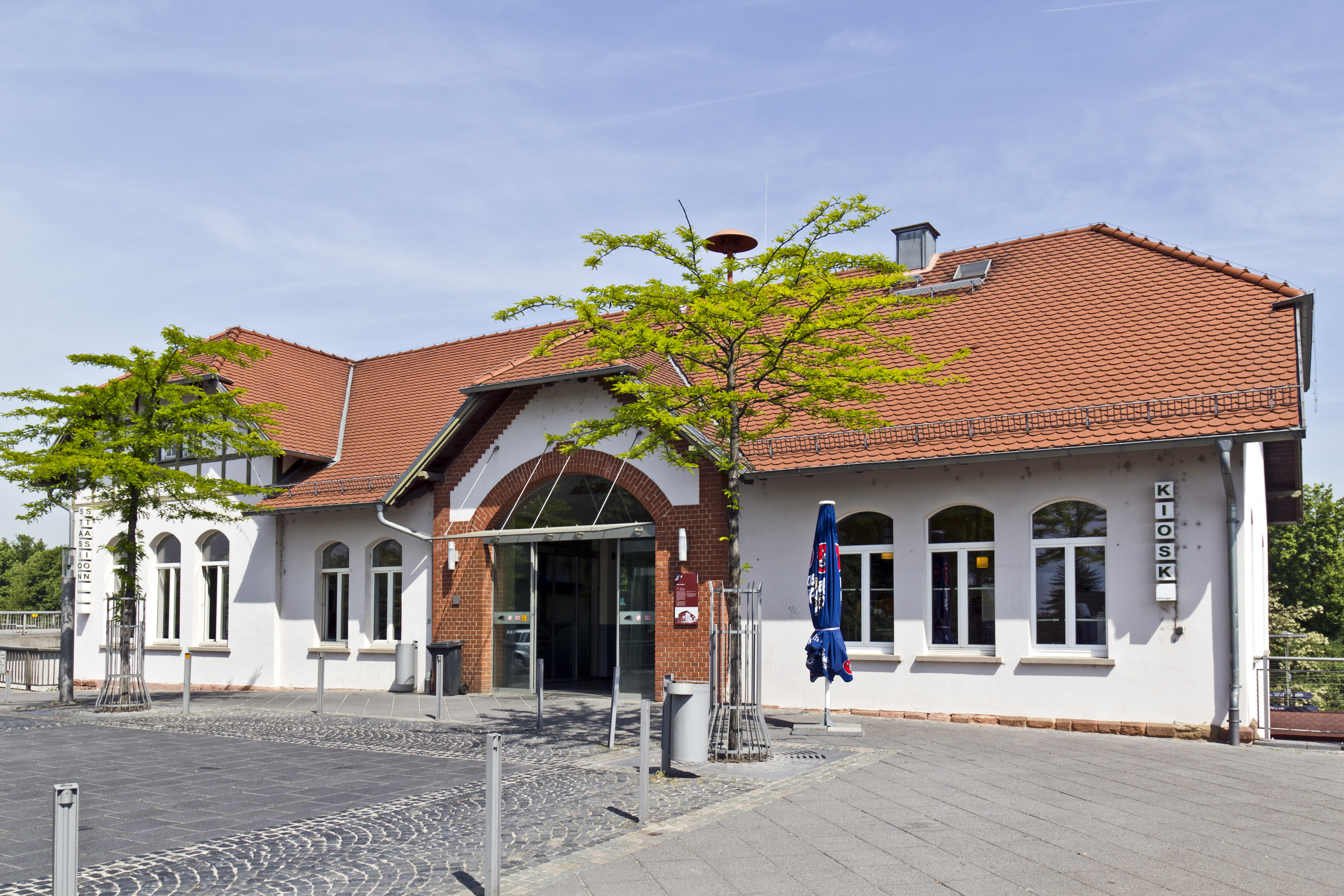

General information
- Location: Am Rampen 1, Bischofsheim, Hesse; Germany
- Coordinates: 49°59′25″N 8°21′45″E
- Owner: DB Netz
- Operator: DB Station&Service
- Lines: Mainz–Darmstadt–Aschaffenburg (KBS 651); Mainz–Frankfurt (KBS 645.8/645.9/655; Mainz rail bypass (KBS 645.9
- Platforms: 4
- Train operators: S-Bahn Rhein-Main

Construction
- Accessible: Yes
- Architectural style: Art Nouveau

Other information
- Station code: 3901
- IBNR: 8000241
- Category: 4
- Fare zone: : 6593; RNN: 300 (RMV transitional tariff)
- Website: www.bahnhof.de

History
- Opened: 1904

Passengers
- 2,000

Services
| Preceding station | DB Regio Mitte | Following station |
|---|---|---|
| Mainz Römisches Theater towards Koblenz Hbf | RE 2 Südwest-Express | Rüsselsheim towards Koblenz Hbf |
| Preceding station | Vlexx | Following station |
| Mainz Römisches Theater towards Saarbrücken Hbf | RE 3 | Rüsselsheim towards Frankfurt (Main) Hbf |
| Preceding station | Hessische Landesbahn | Following station |
| Mainz Römisches Theater towards Wiesbaden Hbf | RB 75 | Nauheim (b Groß Gerau) towards Aschaffenburg Hbf |
| Preceding station | Rhine-Main S-Bahn | Following station |
| Mainz-Gustavsburg towards Wiesbaden Hbf | S8 (Rhine-Main S-Bahn) | Rüsselsheim-Opelwerk towards Hanau Hbf |
| Mainz-Kastel towards Wiesbaden Hbf | S9 (Rhine-Main S-Bahn) | Rüsselsheim-Opelwerk towards Hanau Hbf |
Location
- Location within Hesse

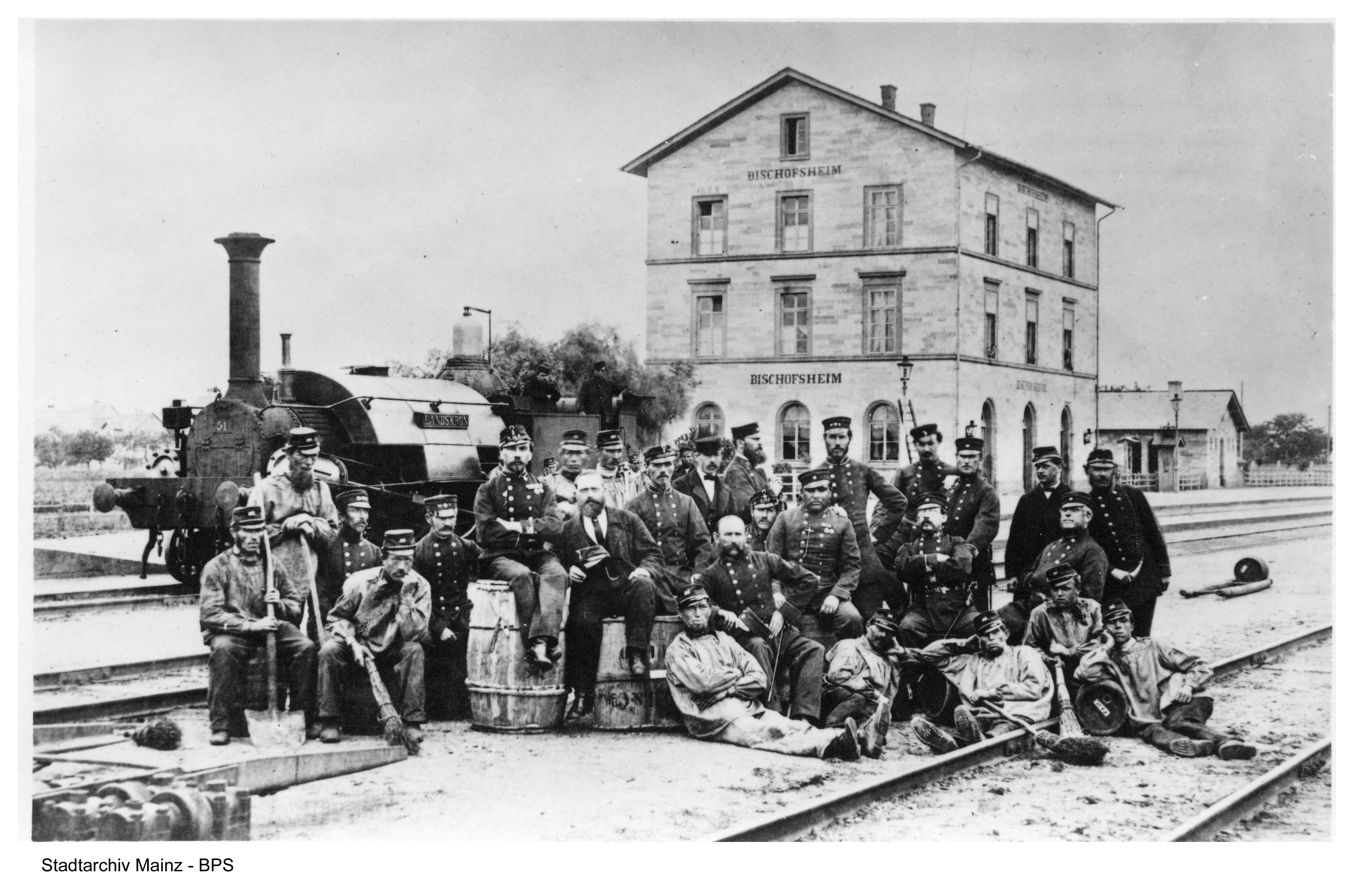
Station staff in Bischofsheim with the shunting locomotive "Landskron" (1867)

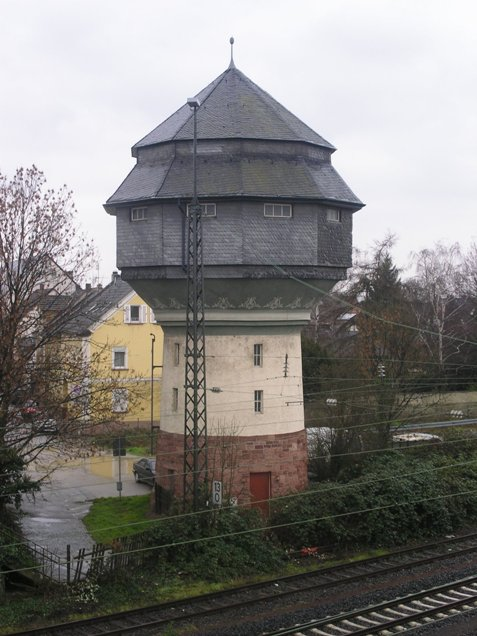
Water tower in the marshalling yard

Mainz-Bischofsheim station is the station of the town of Bischofsheim in the German state of Hesse on the Main Railway from Mainz to Frankfurt am Main. It is classified by Deutsche Bahn as a category 4 station. The station is served by the S-Bahn and regional trains. The station was opened at its current location in 1904.

Between 1930 and 1945, Bischofsheim was a district of the city of Mainz and, as a result, the station was renamed Mainz-Bischofsheim. In 1945, the American and French occupying authorities transferred Bischofsheim to American administration and several months later it became part of the new state of Hesse. Although Bischofsheim became a self-governing municipality again as a result, the station is still called Mainz-Bischofsheim.

== History ==
The Mainz rail bypass was built at the beginning of the 20th century to relieve Mainz Hauptbahnhof, running from Mainz via Wiesbaden to Bischofsheim. The construction of the Kostheim Bridge over the Main near Hochheim connected the Taunus Railway near Mainz-Kastel with the Hessian Ludwig Railway, connecting Mainz, Darmstadt and Aschaffenburg. In Bischofsheim trains can instead branch off the Hessian Ludwig Railway on to the Main Railway to Frankfurt.

The Prussian-Hessian Railway Company created a hub of national significance at Bischofsheim. As a result, freight and passenger facilities were spatially separated. The old station building at the water tower (both of which are listed as monuments under the Hessian heritage law) was now used for handling freight. A new entrance building was built for passengers in 1904, a few hundred metres to the north-west.

== Description ==
The new entrance building was built on a hillside as a massive two-storey building in the contemporary Art Nouveau style. The stone floors are plastered and the gables of the transept are built of timber. Access to the station is upstairs. The platforms are reached via a footbridge from the entrance building.

After numerous structural changes to the original historic building, it was dismantled and modernised in 2002/03.

The Mainz-Bischofsheim marshalling yard is now one of the most important marshalling yards in the Rhine-Main area.

== Rail operations ==
Bischofsheim lies in the area served by the Rhein-Main-Verkehrsverbund (Rhine-Main Transport Association, RMV). It is served by Rhine-Main S-Bahn trains operated by DB Regio. Services on lines S 8 and S 9 each operate at 30-minute intervals on the Wiesbaden Hauptbahnhof–Hanau Hauptbahnhof route. Together the two lines operate at 15-minute intervals through Bischofsheim. Line S8 runs through Mainz Hauptbahnhof to Wiesbaden Hauptbahnhof, while line S9 runs via Kostheim Bridge to Mainz-Kastel and Wiesbaden Hauptbahnhof.

Bischofsheim station is served by the Mittelrhein-Main-Express RE 2 service running between Koblenz Hauptbahnhof and Frankfurt every two hours. It is also served by RB 75 service between Wiesbaden and Aschaffenburg, running hourly.

| Line | Route | Frequency |
|---|---|---|
| RE 2 | Koblenz – Boppard – Bingen (Rhein) – Mainz – Mainz-Bischofsheim – Rüsselsheim – Frankfurt Airport – Frankfurt Hbf | every 2 hours |
| RE 3 | Saarbrücken – Neunkirchen – Bad Kreuznach – Mainz – Mainz-Bischofsheim – Rüsselsheim – Frankfurt Airport – Frankfurt Hbf | every 2 hours |
| RB 75 | Wiesbaden – Mainz – Mainz-Bischofsheim – Groß Gerau – Darmstadt – Dieburg – Babenhausen (Hess) – Aschaffenburg | (half-) hourly |
