= Taunus Railway =

Electrified railway in central western Germany

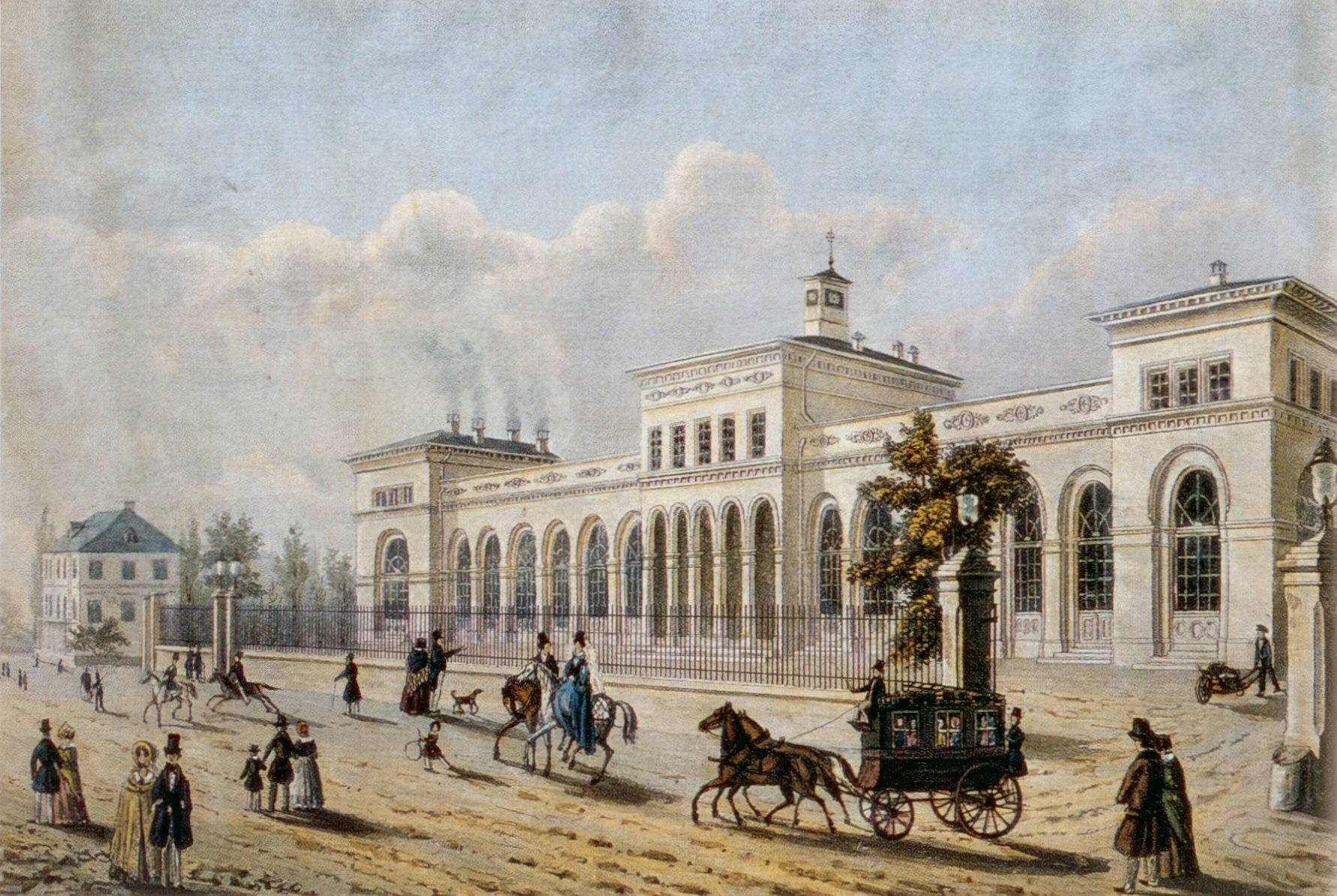
- Former Taunus station in Frankfurt

Overview
- Native name: Taunus-Eisenbahn
- Line number: 3603/3610
- Locale: Hesse, Germany

Service
- Route number: 645.1

Technical
- Line length: 41.2 km (25.6 mi)
- Track gauge: 1,435 mm (4 ft 8 1/2 in) standard gauge
- Electrification: 15 kV/16.7 Hz AC overhead catenary

The Taunus Railway (German: Taunus-Eisenbahn) is a double-track electrified railway line, which connects Frankfurt and Wiesbaden, Germany. It is 41.2 km long and follows the course of the Main on its north side, running quite close to it in some places. Its first stage was opened in September 1839 and is thus the oldest railway line in the German state of Hesse and one of the oldest in Germany. Today it is used by Regional-Express trains between Frankfurt and Wiesbaden and the trains of line S1 of the Rhine-Main S-Bahn between Frankfurt-Höchst and Wiesbaden. Between Frankfurt Hbf (Frankfurt central station) and Frankfurt-Höchst, they run on the line of the former Hessian Ludwig Railway.

== History ==
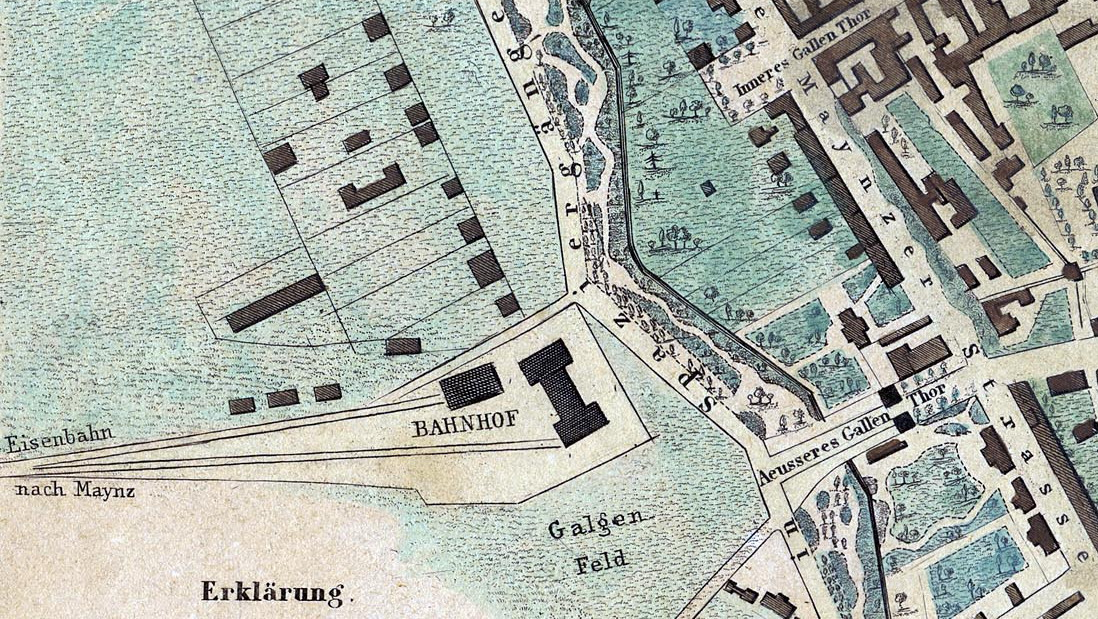
Location of the Taunusbahnhof on the western outskirts of the town of Frankfurt on an 1845 map

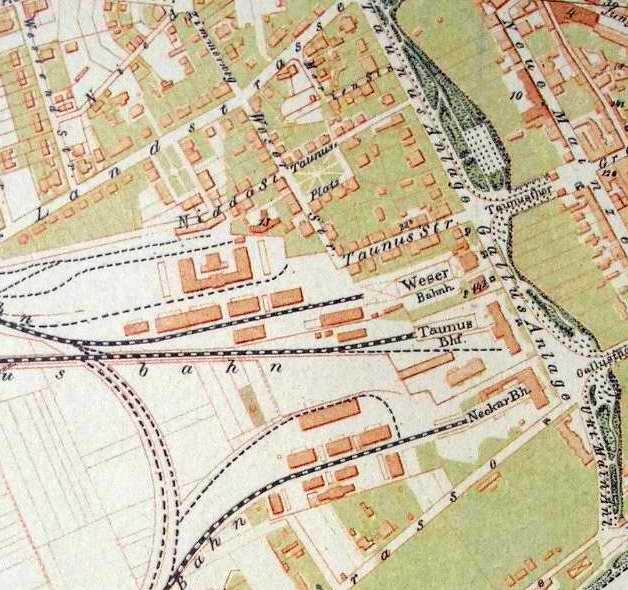
The Taunusbahnhof in Frankfurt and its neighbouring stations around 1860

The building of the line was preceded by many years of negotiations between the three sovereigns states through which the planned line ran: the Free City of Frankfurt, the Duchy of Nassau (of which Wiesbaden was capital) and the Grand Duchy of Hesse for the section in Mainz-Kastel, a suburb of Mainz on the eastern bank of the Rhine. In particular the Grand Duchy opposed its building, because it feared a loss of traffic to the port of Mainz as a result of the connection with the other two states and demanded instead rail connections between Frankfurt and its own cities of Darmstadt, Mainz and Offenbach. In the end they agreed on the current route.

A consortium to build the railway was established in 1835 under the leadership of the two Frankfurt banks Gebrüder Bethmann and Rothschild. The shares that it issued were immediately oversubscribed 40 times, enabling work to begin in 1837. Nevertheless, the final concession was not approved until 1838: by the City of Frankfurt on 8 May, by the Grand Duchy of Hessen on 11 May and by Nassau on 13 June. The private Taunus Railway Company (Taunus-Eisenbahn-Gesellschaft) was established on 12 August 1838 in Frankfurt/Main. Paul Camille von Denis, a Bavarian, born in Mainz, who had worked on the first German railway, the Bavarian Ludwigsbahn between Nuremberg and Fürth (opened in 1835), designed the route.

=== Operations ===
The first stage was opened on 26 September 1839 from the Taunus station in Gallusanlage (now Willy-Brandt-Platz), Frankfurt, to the then small Nassau town of Höchst am Main by the Mainz masterbuilder, Ignaz Opfermann. The railway reached Hattersheim am Main on 24 November 1839 and Mainz-Kastel on 13 April 1840. The extension to the Wiesbaden Taunus station on the Rheinstraße was opened 19 May 1840. It was the ninth railway line opened in Germany.

The new railway line immediately led to changes in transport flows, while the losers from this development – especially in Mainz – vigorously defended themselves in an incident called the Nebeljungenstreich—"fog-boyish-prank"—when Mainz merchants sabotaged the port at Biebrich. Carting companies and drivers of the region, fearing for their income undertook an attack in Mainz-Kastel, on the line and damaged the tracks. They were prevented at gunpoint from inflicting more damage.

The director of the company from 1840 to 1852 was Johann Adam Beil, a Hessian privy councillor and former Frankfurt senator. The line was originally 43.4 kilometres long. A 6.6 kilometres branch from Höchst to Bad Soden (the Soden Railway) opened in 1863. Originally the railway operated six locomotives from the factory of George and Robert Stephenson, 87 carriages and 44 wagons. The first engine drivers were British.

=== Ownership change ===
The Taunus Railway suffered from competition from the Frankfurt–Mainz line (opened on the south bank of the Main in 1863) and it decided to sell its company to the Hessian Ludwig Railway (Hessischen Ludwigsbahn, HLB) in 1871. The HLB took over the enterprise with effect from 1 January 1872, but it sold it on to the Prussian state railways, which took it over on 3 May 1872.

In 1888, the line in Frankfurt was shortened by about a kilometre when it was diverted from its old railway terminal to the new Frankfurt Central Station (Hauptbahnhof). The same happened in 1906 at the Wiesbaden end, where the current Wiesbaden Central Station replaced the old Taunus station.

=== Operations after the First World War ===
In 1920, the line was taken over by the Deutsche Reichsbahn. It attained great importance for long distance, regional and suburban passenger traffic and to a lesser extent in freight traffic.

=== Operation after the Second World War ===
The railway line was badly damaged in the Second World War, particularly in the area of the central stations in Wiesbaden and Frankfurt and in the Mainz-Kastel area. After its repair and the resumption of operations, it re-established its former importance, with increasing freight traffic on the line, especially on the section from Kostheim junction to Wiesbaden East station. By the end of 1970 the line had achieved considerable importance for long-distance traffic. The Deutsche Bundesbahn timetable in 1970 included a long-distance service from Wiesbaden to Bremerhaven-Lehe. With the introduction of the two-class Intercity (IC) network in 1979, every second IC train ran from Cologne to Frankfurt via Wiesbaden and the Taunus Railway. The time lost as a result of operating through the terminal station at Wiesbaden, which at the time still required the exchange of locomotives, and the increasing aspiration to integrate Frankfurt Airport in the regular-interval network of the IC movement led to a gradual depletion of the major connections on the line, as the route via Mainz did not need a change in direction and running times could thus be shortened. In the early 1990s, the long-distance traffic on the Taunus Railway was operated only by single IC commuter trains between Frankfurt and Wiesbaden, which was eventually discontinued for lack of demand.

With the founding of the Frankfurter Verkehrs- und Tarifverbund (Frankfurt Transport and Fares Association), the line was included in its fare structure. Line S 1 of the Rhine-Main S-Bahn started operations on the line in May 1978, although this service does not run on the Taunus Railway runs between Frankfurt-Höchst and Frankfurt Central Station, instead it uses the Main-Lahn Railway. In addition, express trains operated on the route, in some cases to/from Koblenz. In 1980, services of S-Bahn line S 14 (called S 8 service since 1995) commenced on the section between Wiesbaden Ost and Wiesbaden Central Station.

In 1995, the Rhein-Main-Verkehrsverbund (Rhine-Main Transport Association, RMV) replaced the FVV, and simultaneously introduced the new Regional-Express line 90 (the former express trains were now rebranded as Regional-Expresses, abbreviated as RE), which used the Taunus Railway from Wiesbaden Central Station to Kostheim junction. At the timetable change in the summer of 2000, the RE-90 service was discontinued due to poor loadings and replaced on the same section by the new S 9 service. The RE 10 service (Neuwied–Koblenz–Wiesbaden–Frankfurt) now run largely hourly, even during peak hours, sometimes every half-hour. There are no longer any scheduled long-distance passenger services on the line, only the Wiesbaden Ost–Wiesbaden Hauptbahnhof section is still regularly used by long-distance trains.

In 1970, Deutsche Bundesbahn presented a development program, which included two connecting curves from a new Cologne–Gross-Gerau line, connecting to Frankfurt, Mainz and Wiesbaden. During the 1992 regional planning process for the high-speed line between Cologne and the Rhine/Main, the so-called Eddersheim curve was proposed southwest of Eddersheim to connect the high-speed line with the Taunus Railway to/from Frankfurt. The curve, which would have had a radius of 975 m, was not ultimately built.

== Infrastructure ==
=== Frankfurt Taunusbahnhof (Taunus station) ===
Frankfurt Taunusbahnhof was the historical starting point of the Taunus Railway and was replaced in 1888 by the new Centralbahnhof (central station), now: Hauptbahnhof (main station).

=== Frankfurt (Main) Hauptbahnhof ===
Frankfurt (Main) Hauptbahnhof (line-kilometre 0.0) has been the starting point of the line since 1888 and is the point from which chainage is currently calculated.

=== Frankfurt main freight yard ===
The western entrance to the Frankfurt main freight yard (Hauptgüterbahnhof) was located at line-kilometre 6.1. After this was abandoned, the access route was closed.

=== Nied railway bridge ===
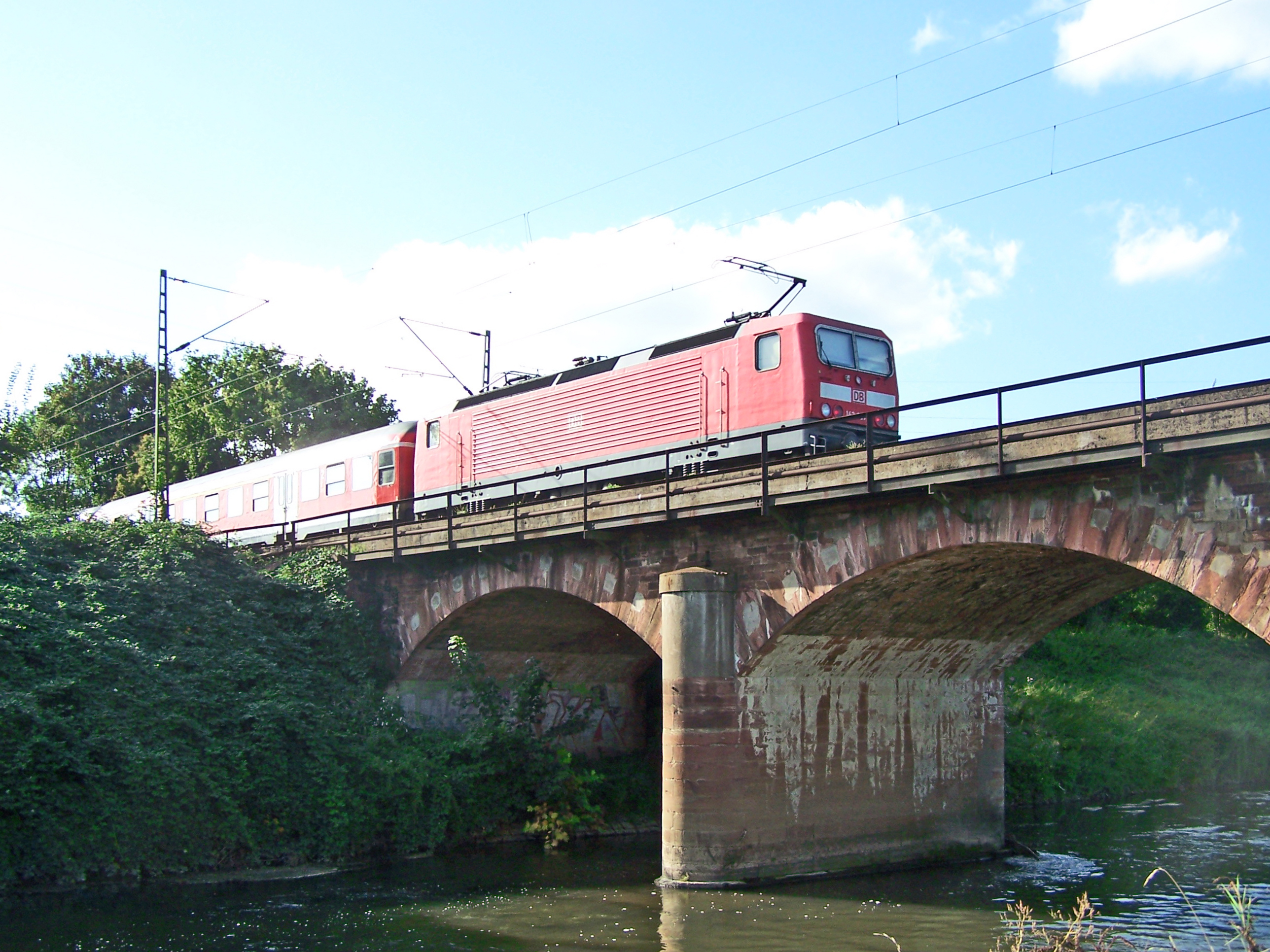
Train from Wiesbaden crosses the Nidda bridge of the Taunus Railway

The Nied railway bridge (line-kilometre 8,5) is the second oldest railway bridge still in operation in Germany.

=== Frankfurt-Höchst ===
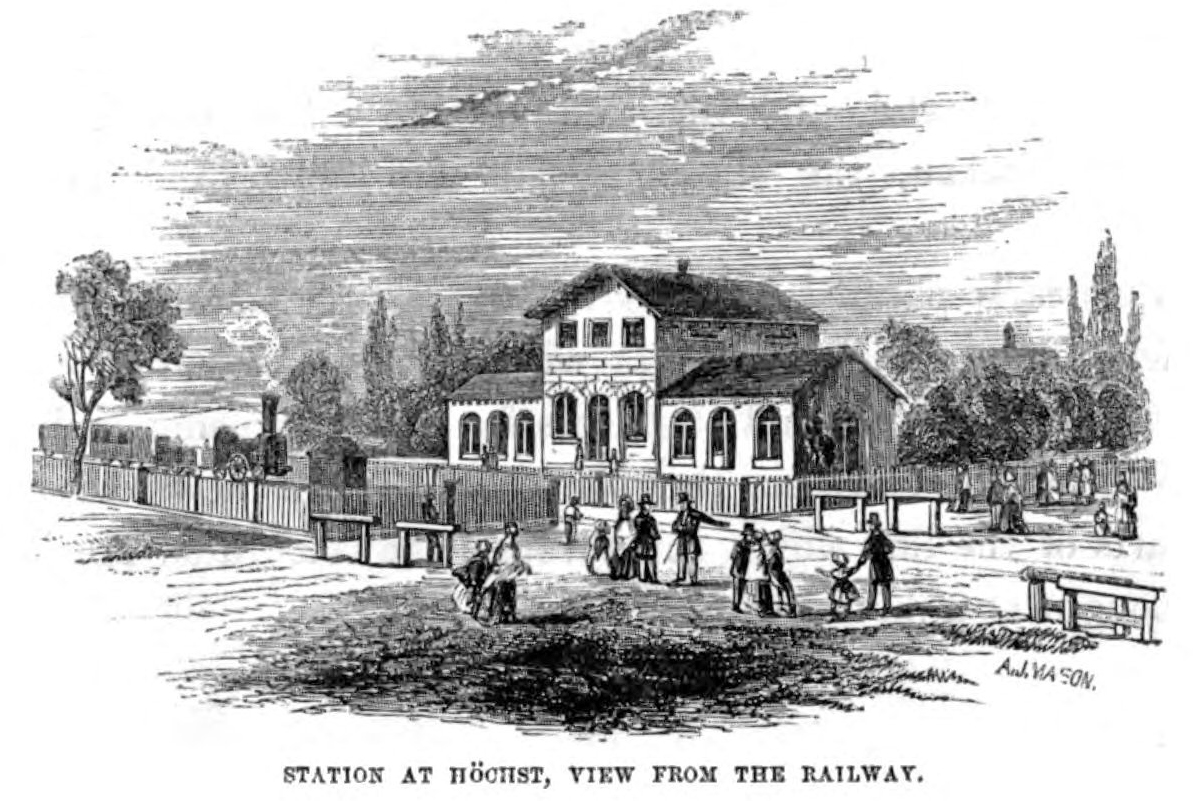
The original Höchst station, 1846

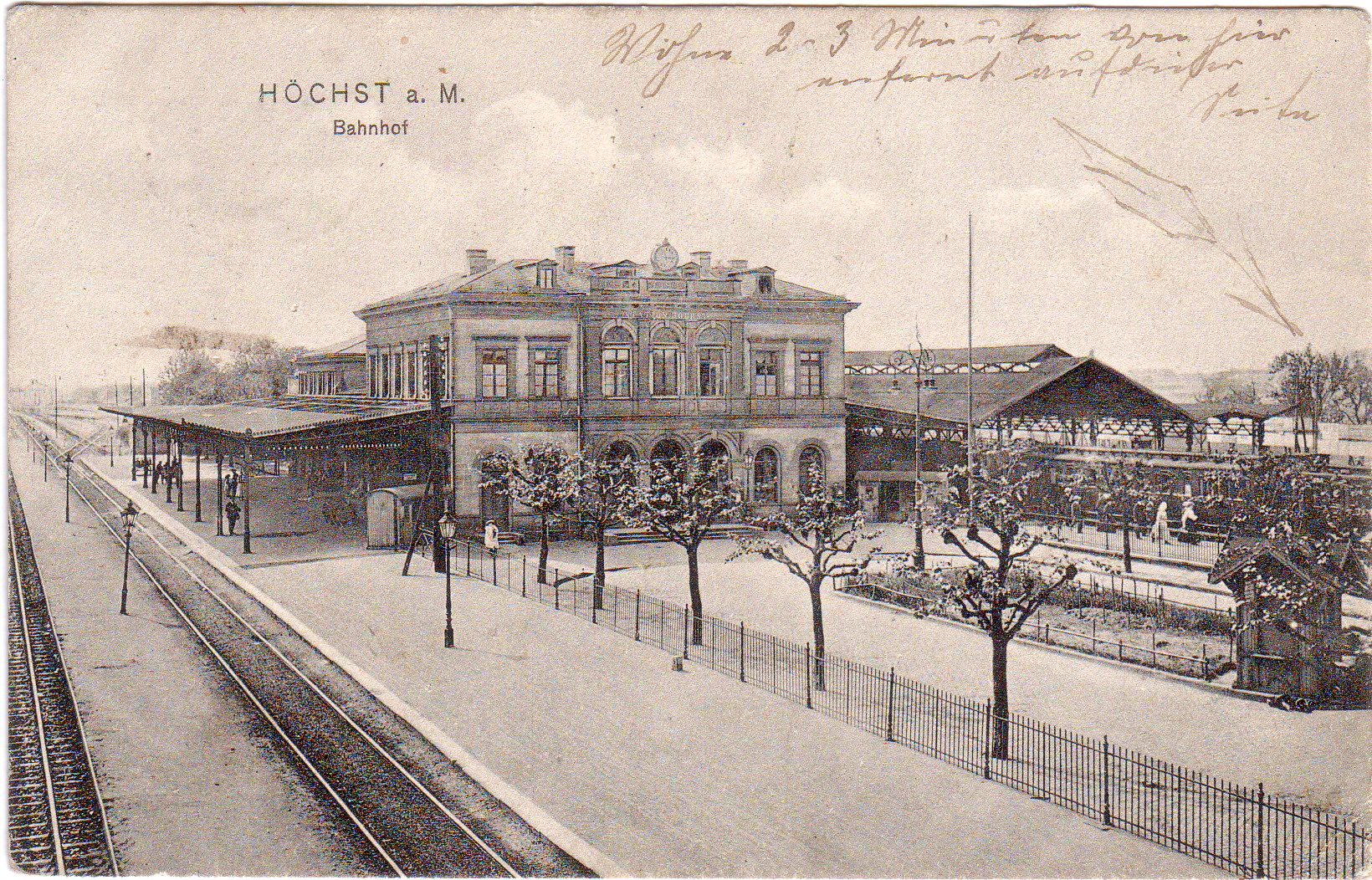
The second Höchst station, built in 1880 and in operation until 1914

In Frankfurt-Höchst (line-kilometre 9.3), the Main-Lahn Railway crosses the Taunus railway and the Königstein Railway and the Soden Railway branch off here. The latter is a 6.6-kilometre-long branch line to Bad Soden am Taunus, which was operated from its opening in 1847 by the Taunus Railway and taken over by it in 1862/63.

=== Frankfurt-Höchst Farbwerke ===
Frankfurt-Höchst Farbwerke (line-kilometre 10.4) is a part (Bahnhofsteil, Bft) of Frankfurt-Höchst station. When it was opened in 1967, it was designated as Farbwerke Hoechst, but after the dissolution of the Hoechst dye works, it was renamed Frankfurt-Höchst Farbwerke.

=== Frankfurt-Sindlingen ===
The halt of Frankfurt-Sindlingen (line-kilometre 12.2) serves the district of Frankfurt-Sindlingen. It was opened as Sindlingen-Zeilsheim in 1893. The original entrance building was replaced by a new one in 1968, which, however, was completely burned down after an explosion on 29 February 1984.

=== Schwarzbach bridge ===
The Taunus railway crosses the Schwarzbach (line-kilometre 14.8) about 100 metres northeast of the Hattersheim (Main) station on a rather nondescript two-arch sandstone bridge. The bridge dates from the origin of the railway from 1839 and is thus—like the Nied railway bridge—one of the oldest still operating railway bridges in Germany. It was based on a design by Paul Camille von Denis. The bridge was renovated with concrete in 1911. It is heritage-listed under the Hessian Monument Protection Act.

=== Hattersheim (Main) ===
Hattersheim (Main) station (line-kilometre 14.9) was built with the line. The station building dates back to the beginning of 1842.

=== Eddersheim ===
The halt of Eddersheim (line-kilometre 18.9) serves the Eddersheim district of Hattersheim am Main.

=== Flörsheim (Main) ===
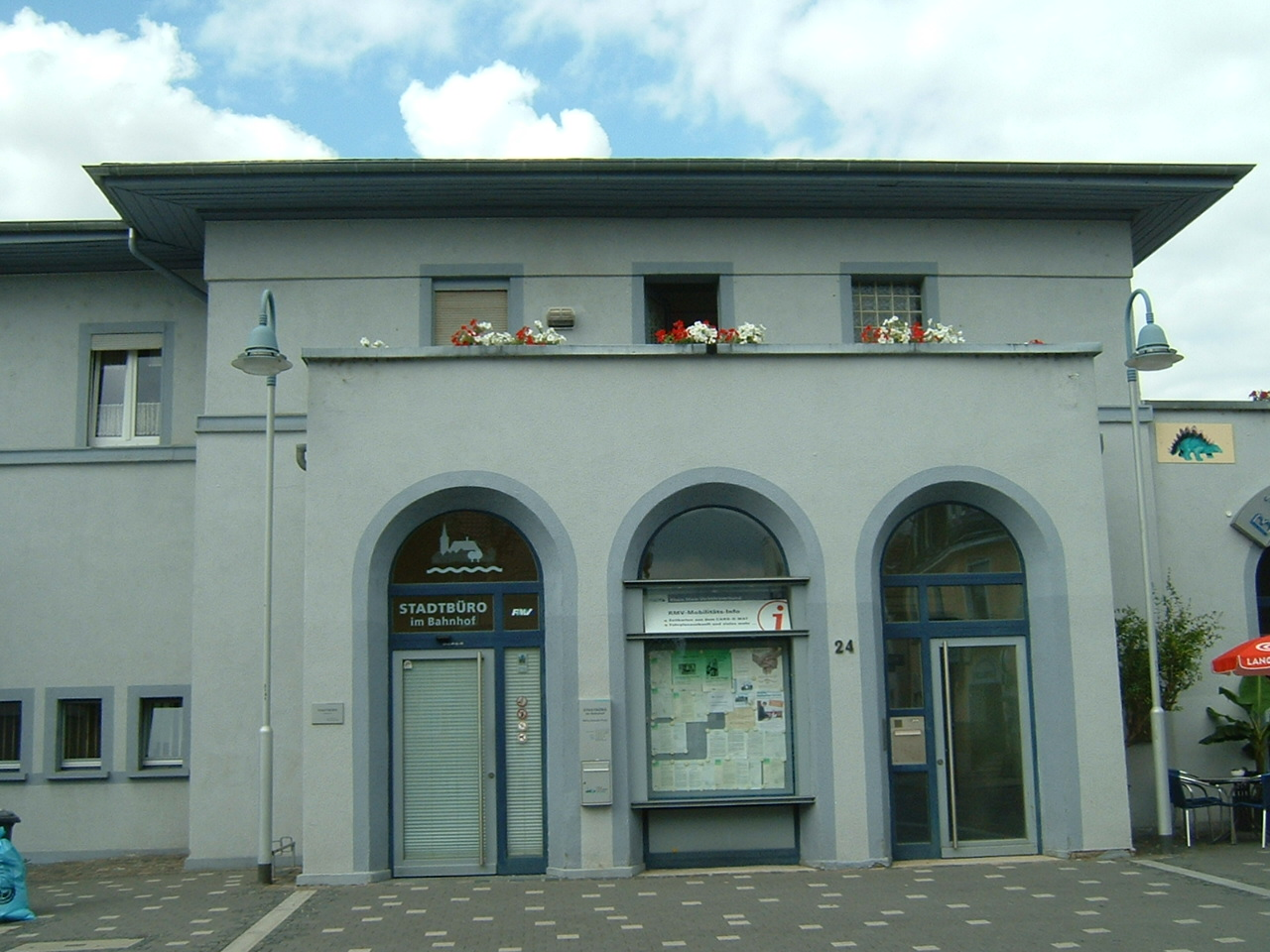
Entrance building of Flörsheim station

Flörsheim (Main) station (line-kilometre 21.9) serves the town of Flörsheim am Main. The main entrance building, although rebuilt several times, dates from the first year of the line, 1839.

=== Flörsheim Taubertsmühle ===
The Flörsheim tank farm of Deutschen Shell AG is connected by a siding from Flörsheim Taubertsmühle junction (line-kilometre 25.0).

=== Hochheim (Main) ===
Hochheim (Main) station (line-kilometre 28.4) serves the town of Hochheim am Main.

=== Kostheim ===
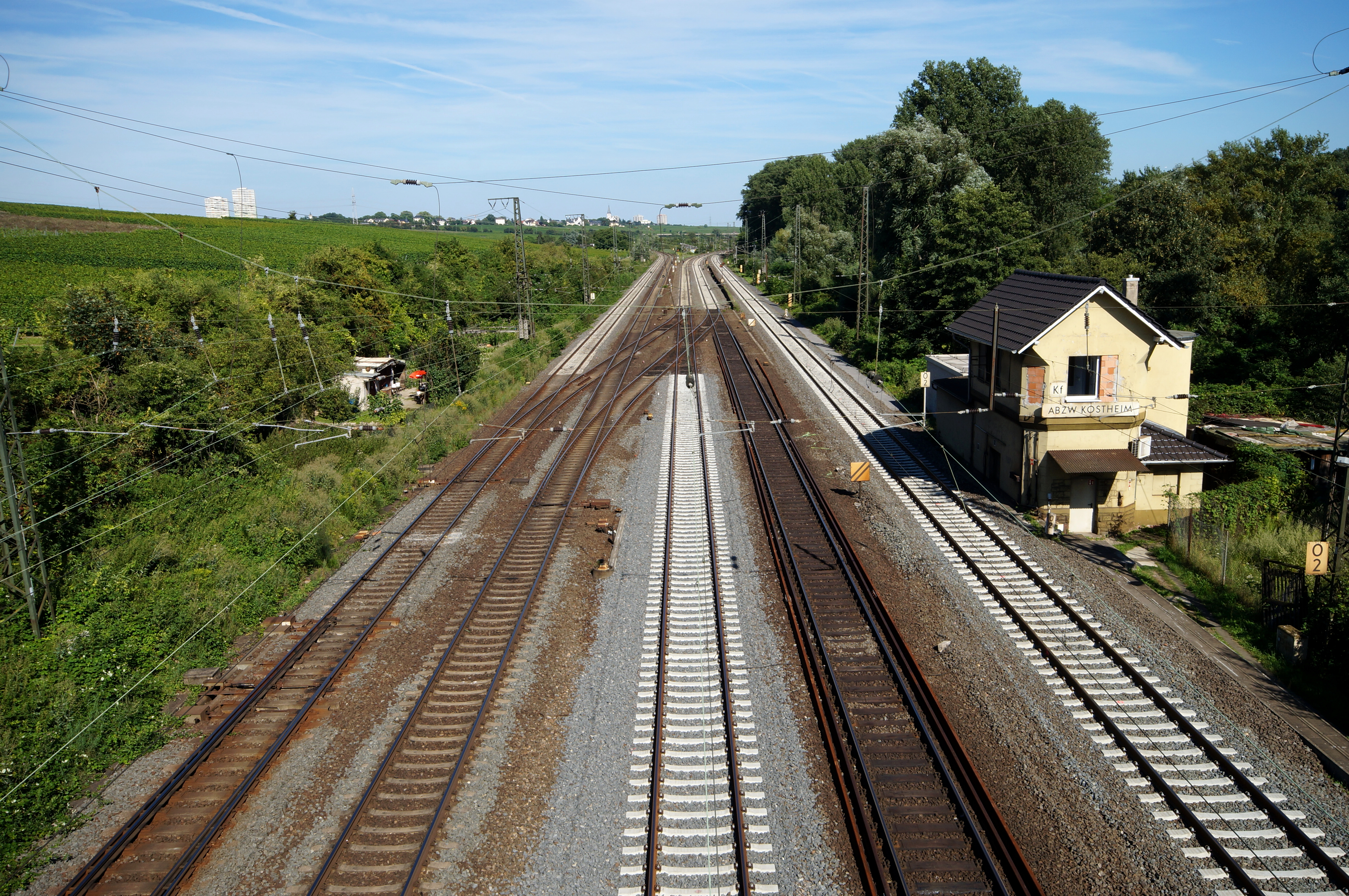
Kostheim junction: the Mainz rail bypass is on the left and the Taunus Railway is on the right

Mainz rail bypass meets the Taunus railway at Kostheim junction (line-kilometre 30.8). The associated signal box building has been preserved. It stands side-gabled to the south of the tracks and was put into operation in 1904 together with the Mainz rail bypass. A few metres east of the signal box was a listed building pedestrian bridge, also from 1904, that crossed the tracks. It was demolished with the building of Kommerzienrat-Disch Bridge, a road bridge that still connects the main street of Mainz-Kostheim with Hochheimer Straße (L 119).

=== Mainz-Kastel ===
Kastel station, entrance building on 13 April 1840 to the right with the first train towards Wiesbaden

Mainz-Kastel station (line-kilometre 33.4) is now the most southerly station of Wiesbaden. From here there were two connections to the centre of Mainz: a pontoon bridge and the Mainz–Kastel train ferry. The construction of a railway bridge was not possible. Therefore, the Taunus Railway in cooperation with the Hessian Ludwig Railway (Hessische Ludwigsbahn) opened the Mainz–Kastel train ferry with three steam-powered ferries in 1861. This was closed after the opening of the Mainz South Bridge (Mainzer Südbrücke) in 1863 but continued to operate as a passenger ferry until the opening of the fixed Mainz road bridge on 30 May 1885.

=== Wiesbaden Ost ===
Branch line to the Rhine station in Biebrich and the Mainz–Kastel train ferry

Wiesbaden Ost (east) station (line-kilometre 37.8) was originally called Biebrich Curve and 'was later called Biebrich Ost. After the incorporation of Biebrich into Wiesbaden, "Wiesbaden" was added to its name in 1927, but "Biebrich" was deleted in 1934 and only "Ost" was maintained in the station name. This led to a geographically incorrect name as the station is located in the south of Wiesbaden. From 18 September 1862, there was a connection from Curve station to Nassau Rhine Railway (Nassauische Rheinbahn), which since 1856 had run down the Rhine to Rüdesheim in the Rheingau. This link is now in regular use only by freight trains. A brief period of operation with long-distance trains, which, in order to shorten the travel time, only stopped in Wiesbaden-Biebrich, bypassing Wiesbaden Hauptbahnhof, was discontinued because of insufficient demand. A branch line branched off in Wiesbaden Ost to Biebrich, later called Rheinbahnhof (Rhine station; see below).

=== Biebrich ===
==== Branch line to Biebrich ====
On 3 August 1840 a 1.5 kilometre-long branch line was opened to Biebrich, which was operated by horse-drawn traffic until 14 May 1872. The line was shortened in 1908 and the station was relocated accordingly. From then on, the line was only used for freight traffic, as travellers to Wiesbaden, who arrived by ship, could be transported by the Wiesbaden steam tramway, operated by the South German Railway Company (Süddeutsche Eisenbahn-Gesellschaft, SEG) from 1889. The branch still exists today as an industrial siding from the Kalle-Albert industrial park.

==== Biebrich / Rheinufer station ====
The terminal station of Biebrich (not to be confused with the current Wiesbaden-Biebrich station on the Right Rhine line), later called Rheinbahnhof (Rhine station), lay at the end of a branch line on the Rhine bank in Biebrich. It was particularly important in the early days for rail freight operations and was in the immediate vicinity of the customs office on the Rhine bank. The opening of the link triggered the so-called fog prank (Nebeljungenstreich) in 1841. With this act of sabotage Mainz merchants attempted to block access to the free port of Biebrich to remove the competitive advantage of the railway.

The station's entrance building was rather simple: a two-storey building on a rectangular floor plan with a clock tower on the ridge. It resembled the central buildings of the main stations in Wiesbaden and Frankfurt, which had also been planned by Ignaz Opfermann. This first building was demolished in 1908 and replaced by a new building on today's Wilhelm-Kalle-Straße, which today is being used by the employee health insurance company of the Chemische Fabrik Kalle.

=== Wiesbaden Hauptbahnhof ===
The Taunus Railway has ended in Wiesbaden Hauptbahnhof (line-kilometre 41.2) since 1906.

=== Wiesbaden Taunusbahnhof ===
From 1840 to 1906, the Taunus Railway ended at the Taunus station (Taunusbahnhof; line-kilometre ca. 43), before it was replaced by today's Hauptbahnhof.

== Rail services ==
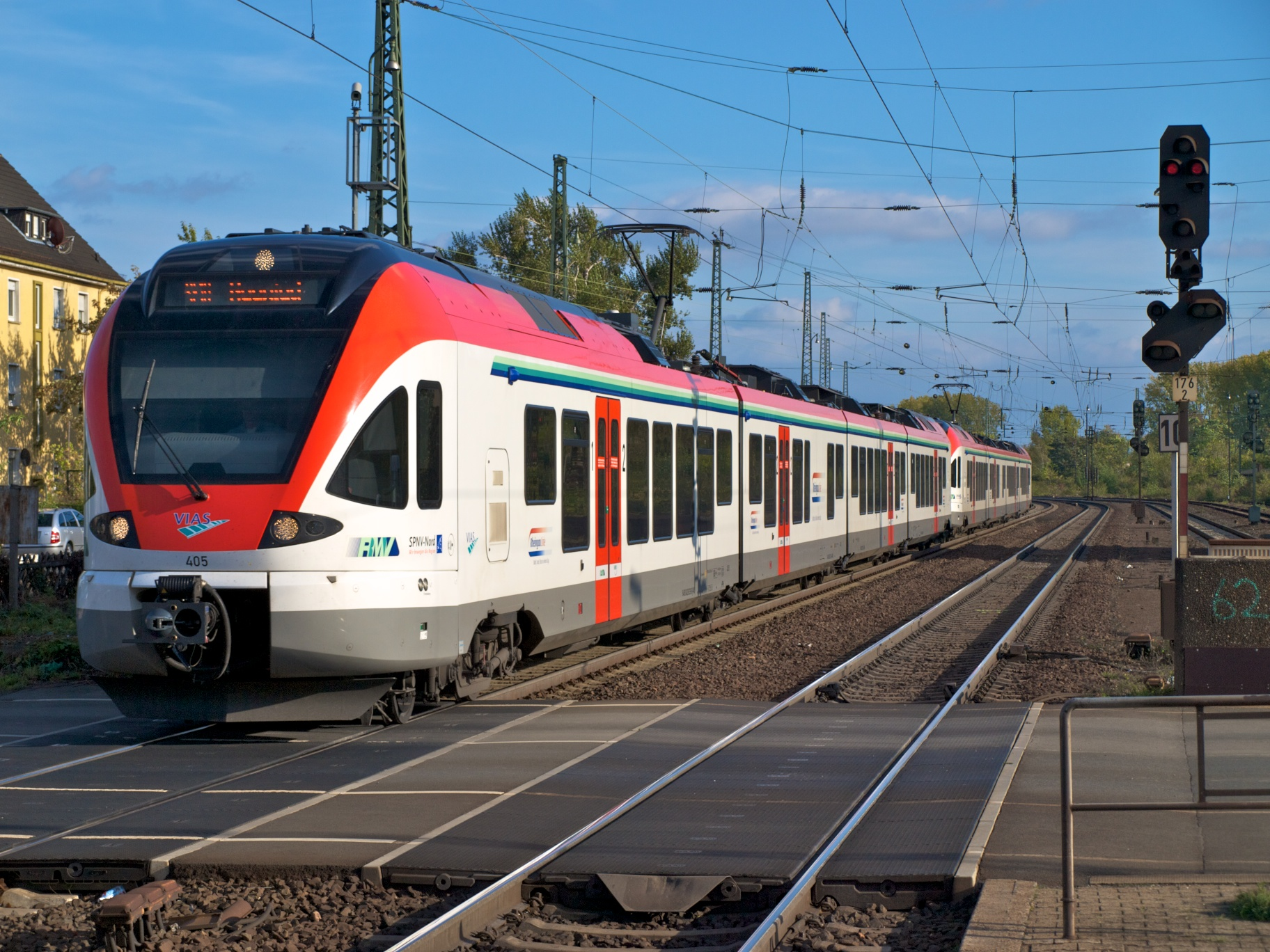
VIAS service on line SE 10 near the entrance to Mainz-Kastel station

Both regional and express services were operated with Silberling carriages, hauled by class 140 or 141 locomotives and occasionally by other classes, while long-distance services were hauled mainly by class 103, 110 and later 112 locomotives. The IC commuter trains in the late 1990s consisted of 2 to 3 carriages, hauled by a class 141 locomotive. As early as the mid-1970s, prior to the inauguration of the S-Bahn, trains were also operated by class 420 electric multiple units. After the conversion to S-Bahn operations, all S-Bahn services were operated with these trains. Class 420 sets are still used overwhelmingly on lines S 8 and S 9, while line S 1 has been operated since 2004 almost exclusively with class 423 multiple units. Line S 1 was thus one of the first lines to be operated by the new S-Bahn trains. These trains were put on the line so that commuters to Frankfurt could avoid extensive construction work on the autobahn to Frankfurt, using the most comfortable trains with the operator hoping to retain them as permanent customers.

After the founding of the Deutsche Bahn in 1994, the class 140 locomotives were withdrawn from freight traffic, so that they were increasingly replaced, initially by locomotives of class 110 and later by class 143, which are currently used almost exclusively for RE services on the line.

Since the timetable change in December 2010, Regionalbahn services (now RB 10) have been operated on the route of the Taunus Railway and the Right Rhine Railway by the Frankfurt-based company, VIAS. 19 Stadler FLIRT low-floor trains are used on this line. These replaced the Regional-Express services operated by Deutsche Bahn, so that between Koblenz and Wiesbaden, all stops are served hourly. At peak times services between Frankfurt and Wiesbaden are operated every half hour.
