= Mainz-Kastel station =

Railway station in Mainz, Germany

Mainz Kastel
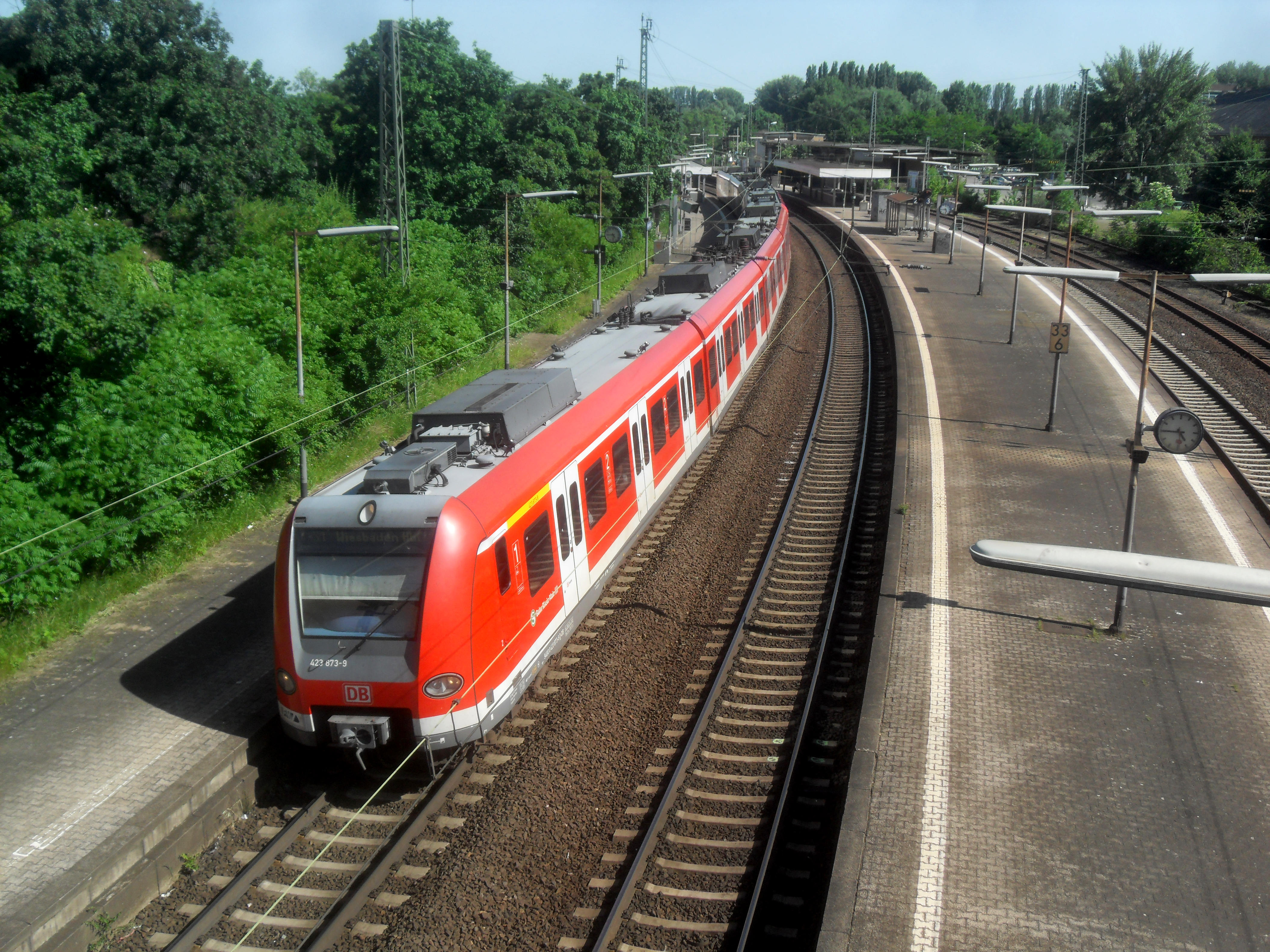
- The station seen from the Theodor Heuss Bridge

General information
- Location: Eisenbahnstr. 7, Mainz-Kastel, Wiesbaden, Hesse; Germany
- Coordinates: 50°0′25″N 8°16′57″E
- Owner: Deutsche Bahn
- Operator: DB Netz; DB Station&Service
- Line: Taunus Railway (33.4 km)
- Platforms: 1 island platform 1 side platform
- Tracks: 4
- Train operators: S-Bahn Rhein-Main; VIAS

Other information
- Station code: 3904
- DS100 code: FMK
- IBNR: 8000615
- Category: 4
- Fare zone: : 6501; RNN: 300 (RMV transitional tariff)
- Website: www.bahnhof.de

History
- Opened: 19 May 1840

Services
Preceding station	VIAS	Following station
Wiesbaden Hbf towards Neuwied	RB 10	Frankfurt-Höchst towards Frankfurt (Main) Hbf
Preceding station	Rhine-Main S-Bahn	Following station
Wiesbaden Ost towards Wiesbaden Hbf	S1 (Rhine-Main S-Bahn)	Hochheim towards Rödermark-Ober Roden
Wiesbaden Ost towards Wiesbaden Hbf	S9 (Rhine-Main S-Bahn)	Mainz-Bischofsheim towards Hanau Hbf
Location

Mainz-Kastel station is situated on the Frankfurt–Wiesbaden line (line number 3603; timetable section 645.1) in Mainz-Kastel, now a suburb of Wiesbaden, in the German state of Hesse. It was opened as part of the Taunus Railway, which was opened in 1839/40. The station was opened as part of the last stage of construction of the line to Wiesbaden and was opened on 19 May 1840.

Kastel station is also served by the Regionalbahn service running between Neuwied and Frankfurt (RB 10) every hour. In the rush hour it extends to a half-hourly service.

== Buses ==
The following lines of ESWE and MVG serve the station (bus station Brückenkopf): 6, 6A, 9, 28, 54, 55, 56, 57, 68, 91, 99.
