= Wiesbaden-Biebrich station =

Railway station in Wiesbaden, Germany

Wiesbaden Biebrich
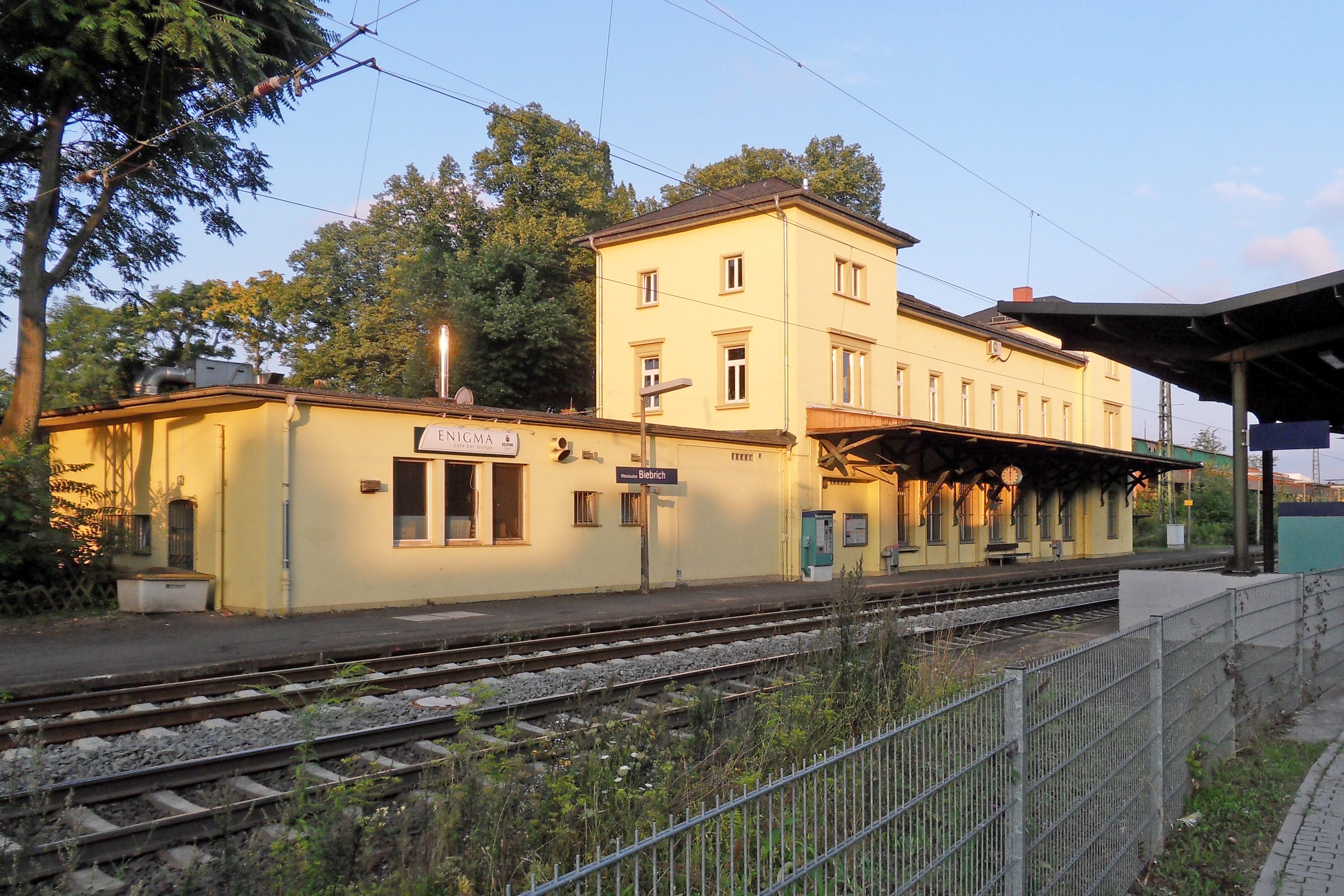

General information
- Location: Seligmann-Baer-Platz 21, Wiesbaden, Hesse; Germany
- Coordinates: 50°02′55″N 8°14′11″E
- Owner: DB Netz
- Operator: DB Station&Service
- Line: East Rhine Railway (39.5 km)
- Platforms: 2

Other information
- Station code: 6746
- DS100 code: FWB
- IBNR: 8000288
- Category: 6
- Fare zone: : 6501; RNN: 300 (RMV transitional tariff)
- Website: www.bahnhof.de

History
- Opened: 11 August 1856

Services
Preceding station	VIAS	Following station
Wiesbaden-Schierstein towards Neuwied	RB 10	Wiesbaden Hbf towards Frankfurt (Main) Hbf
Location
- Location within Hesse

Wiesbaden-Biebrich station is a railway station in the borough of Biebrich in the Hessian state capital of Wiesbaden on the East Rhine Railway from Wiesbaden to Cologne. It is classified by Deutsche Bahn as a category 6 station. The station was opened in 1856.

== Services ==
Biebrich lies in the area served by the Rhein-Main-Verkehrsverbund (Rhine-Main Transport Association, RMV). It is used by Regionalbahn trains operated by VIAS, and buses.

=== Trains ===
Regionalbahn services operate at hourly intervals on the Frankfurt Hauptbahnhof–Neuwied route. In the rush hour, the service extends to a half-hourly interval.

=== Buses ===
The station is also served by the bus lines 47 and 147.
