= Kaiserbrücke, Mainz =

Bridge in Mainz

Kaiserbrücke Emperor Bridge
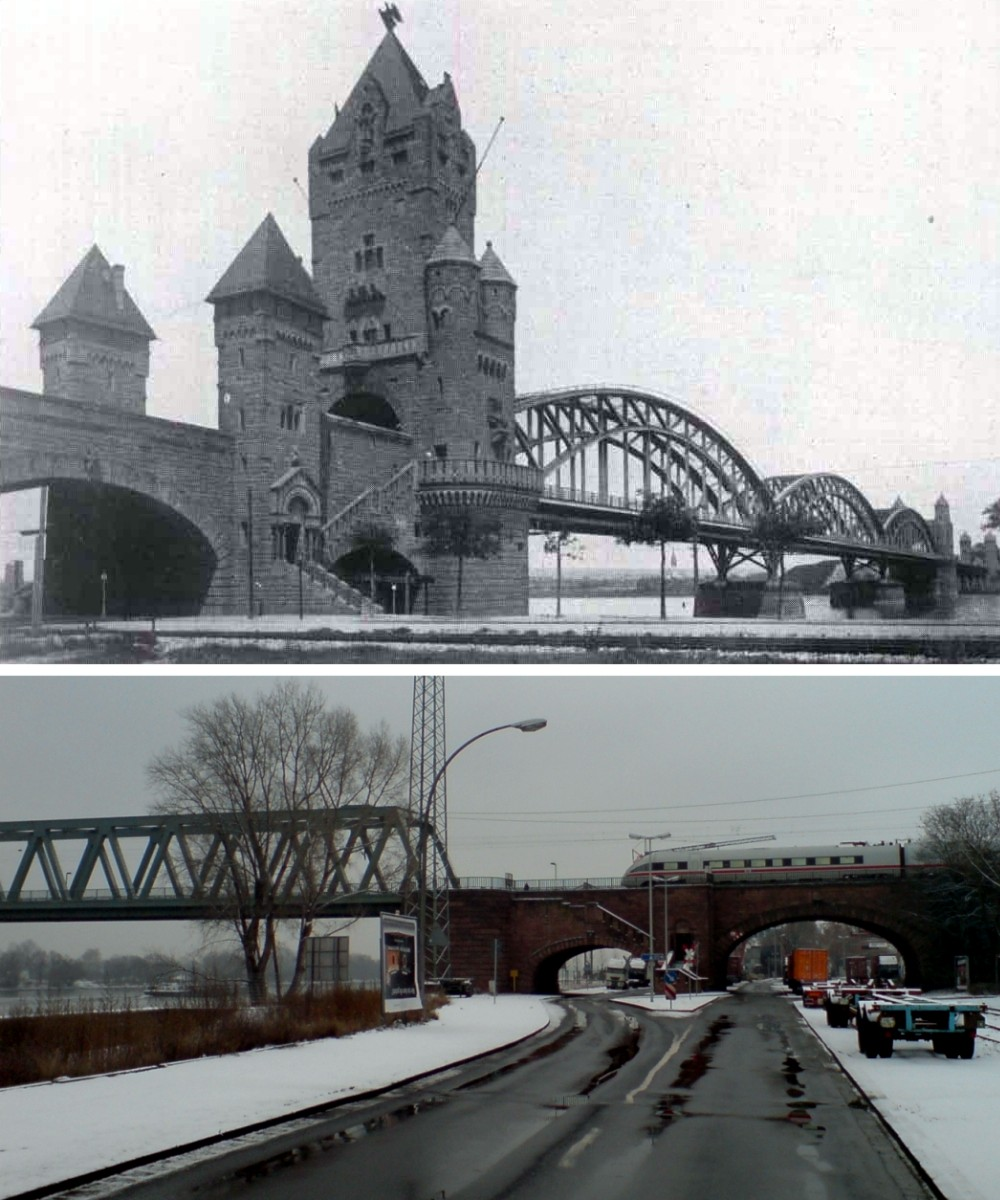
- Neo-roman architecture (1904-1945); Rebuilt without gatehouses (1955-)
- Coordinates: 50°01′21″N 8°15′12″E
- Carries: Railway (Mainbahn), pedestrians
- Crosses: Rhine
- Locale: Mainz, Germany
- Official name: Nordbrücke
- Maintained by: Deutsche Bahn

Characteristics
- Design: Truss

History
- Opened: 1 May 1904, reopened 1955

Location
- Interactive map of Kaiserbrücke

The Kaiserbrücke (English: Emperor Bridge), today officially the Nordbrücke (Northern Bridge), is a railway span on the Mainz rail bypass across the Rhine at the north end of Mainz in the state of Rhineland-Palatinate, Germany. Built between 1901 and 1904, it was named for the German Emperor Wilhelm II, who officially opened it on 1 May 1904. It formed an important part of the German railway system, as well as being an important logistical link for war transports (which were closely tied to railway infrastructure).

The bridge was destroyed in 1945 by retreating German troops. To forestall a second Remagen, the Germans by 19 March had blown all Rhine bridges from Ludwigshafen northward.

It was later reopened in 1955 as the Nordbrücke (Northern Bridge), with parts of the surviving foundations and sculptures adorning it incorporated into the new much less grand structure. The neo-roman gate castles were not rebuilt. The former arched trusses were also replaced with box trusses.

== See also ==
- List of bridges in Germany
