= ESWE Verkehrsgesellschaft =

German public transport company

ESWE Verkehrsgesellschaft mbH
- Company type: city-owned company
- Industry: Public transport
- Headquarters: Gartenfeldstr. 18; 65189 Wiesbaden, Germany
- Area served: Greater Wiesbaden
- Website: http://www.eswe-verkehr.de

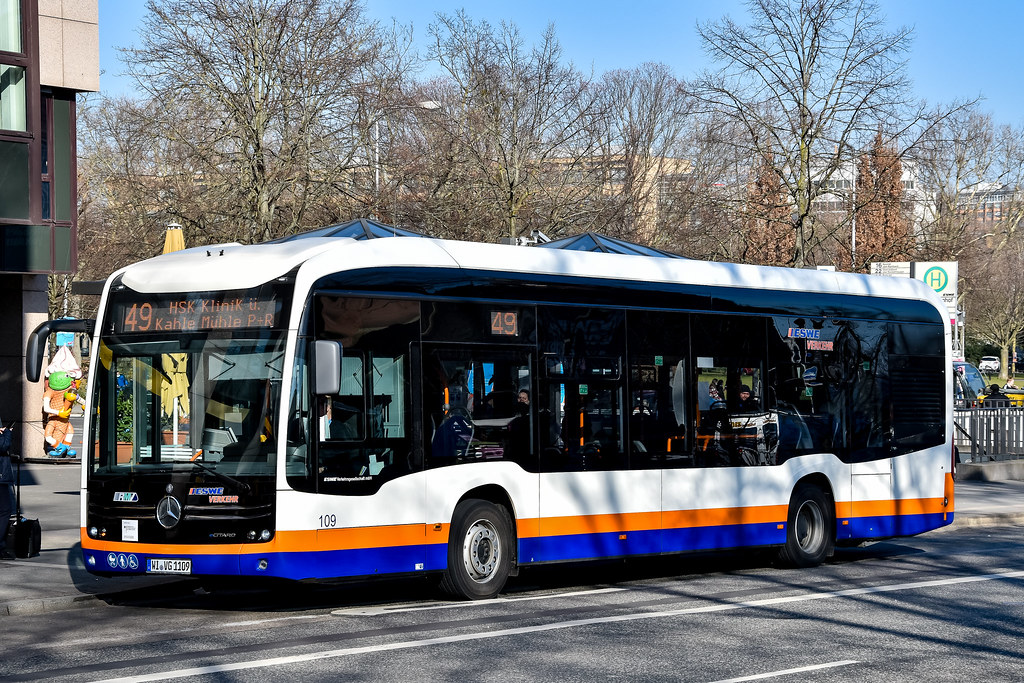
An eCitaro from ESWE Verkehr in service at bus platform D of the “Hauptbahnhof” stop.

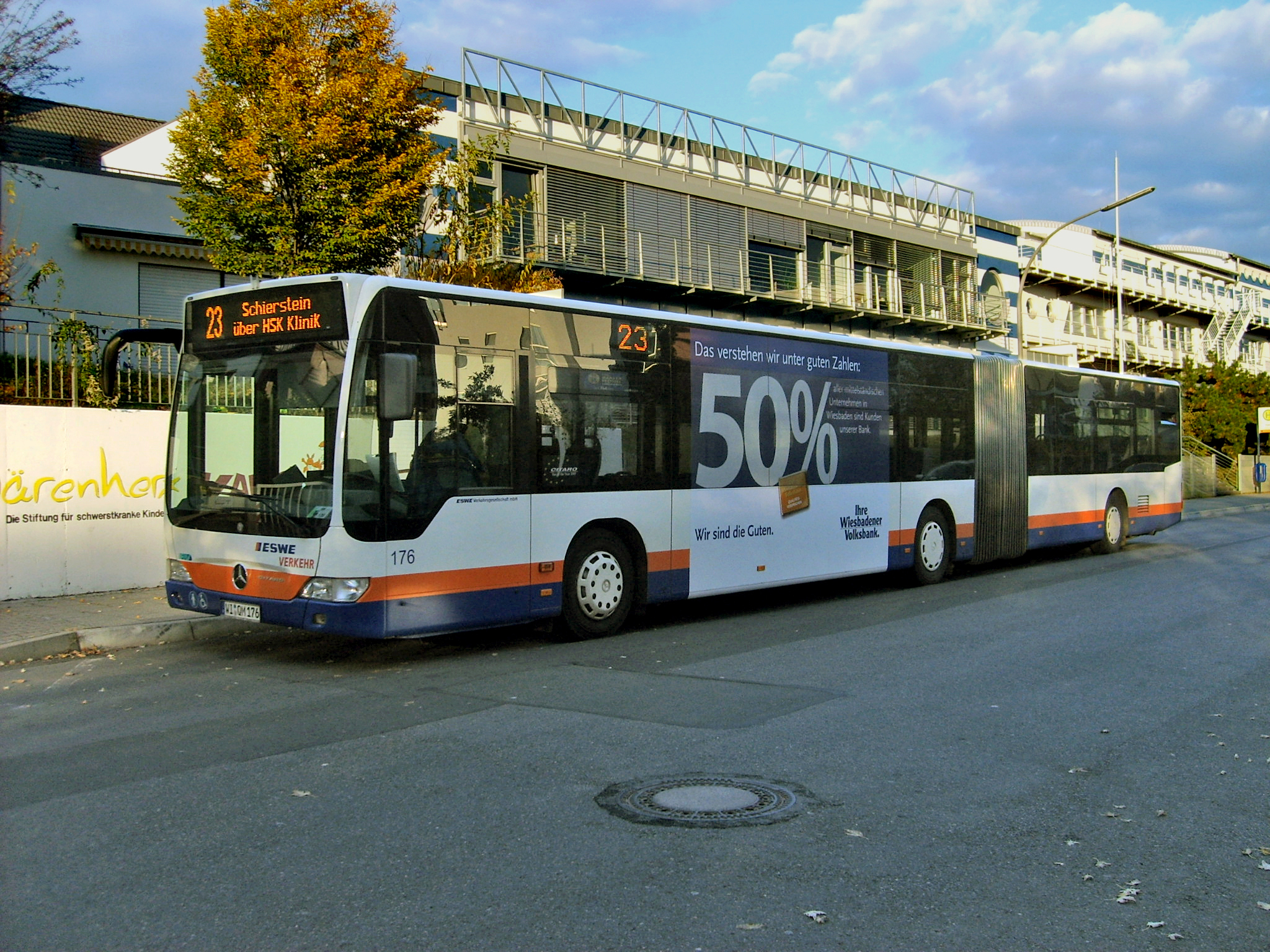
ESWE bus in Schierstein

The ESWE Verkehrsgesellschaft mbH (German for ESWE Transport Company) or ESWE Verkehr is a municipally owned company responsible for operating public transport in Wiesbaden, Germany. It operates 40 bus-lines and 9 night bus-lines. In addition to the city bus service in Wiesbaden, the company also operates the Nerobergbahn.

ESWE Verkehrsgesellschaft and Mainzer Verkehrsgesellschaft are the two shareholders of Verkehrsverbund Mainz-Wiesbaden (VMW) GmbH. In addition, the Wiesbaden transport company is a member of the Rhein-Main-Verkehrsverbund and, through VMW, is also active member in the Rhein-Nahe-Nahverkehrsverbund.
