= Wiesbaden Hauptbahnhof =

Railway station in Hesse, Germany

Wiesbaden Hbf
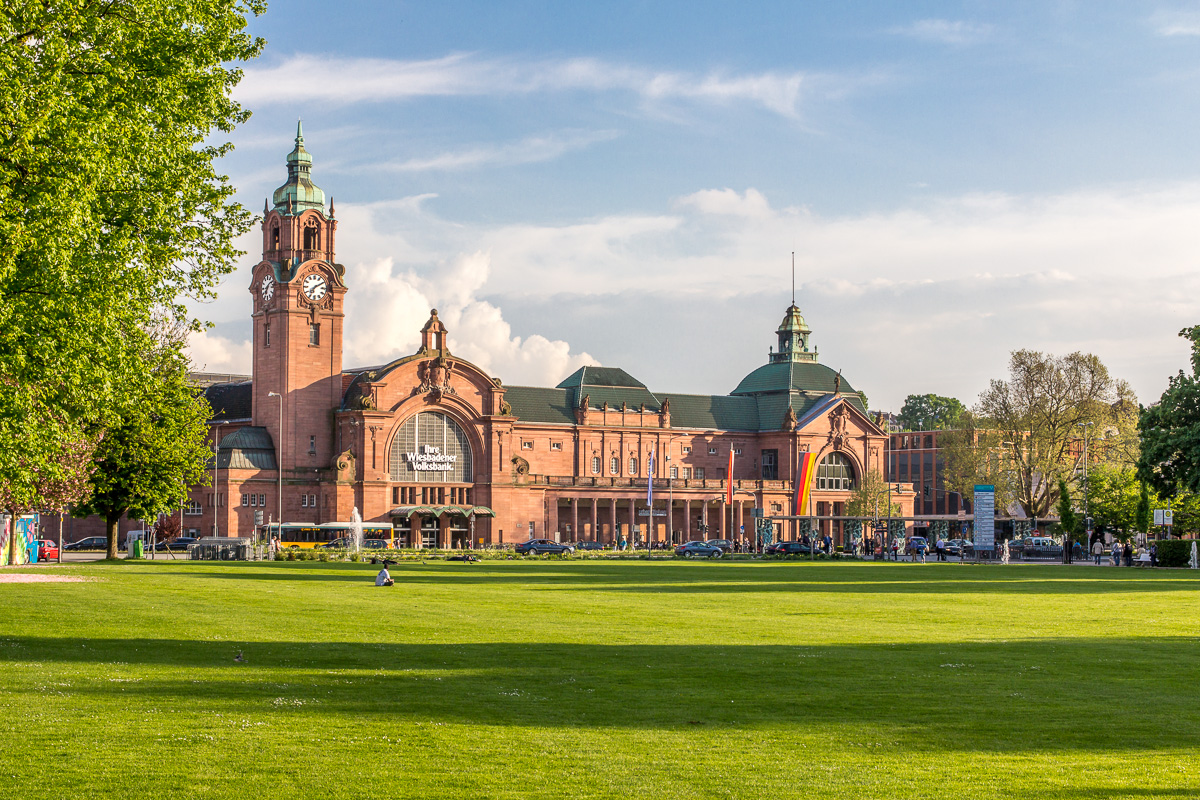
- Wiesbaden Hauptbahnhof (2013)

General information
- Location: Bahnhofsplatz 1, Wiesbaden, Hesse; Germany
- Coordinates: 50°4′15″N 8°14′38″E
- Owner: Deutsche Bahn
- Operator: DB Netz; DB Station&Service
- Lines: Taunus Railway; Connecting line to HSL; East Rhine Railway (KBS 466); Ländches Railway (KBS 627); Rhine-Main Railway (KBS 651); Aar Valley Railway (closed)
- Platforms: 10
- Train operators: DB Fernverkehr; DB Regio Mitte; Hessische Landesbahn; S-Bahn Rhein-Main; VIAS

Construction
- Accessible: Yes
- Architect: Fritz Klingholz
- Architectural style: Neo-baroque

Other information
- Station code: 6744
- DS100 code: FW
- IBNR: 8000250
- Category: 2
- Fare zone: : 6501; RNN: 300 (RMV transitional tariff)
- Website: www.bahnhof.de

History
- Opened: 1906

Passengers
- ~ 40,000

Services
Preceding station	DB Fernverkehr	Following station
Terminus	ICE 11	Mainz Hbf towards München Hbf
Terminus	ICE/ECE 20	Mainz Hbf towards Hamburg-Altona
Limburg Süd towards Köln Hbf	ICE 45	Mainz Hbf towards Stuttgart Hbf or Frankfurt (Main) Hbf
Terminus	ICE 50	Mainz Hbf towards Dresden Hbf
Terminus	ICE 89	Mainz Hbf towards St. Anton am Arlberg
Preceding station	Hessische Landesbahn	Following station
Terminus	RB 75	Mainz Hbf towards Aschaffenburg Hbf
Wiesbaden-Erbenheim towards Limburg (Lahn)	RB 21	Terminus
Preceding station	VIAS	Following station
Wiesbaden-Biebrich towards Neuwied	RB 10	Kastel towards Frankfurt (Main) Hbf
Preceding station	Rhine-Main S-Bahn	Following station
Terminus	S1 (Rhine-Main S-Bahn)	Wiesbaden Ost towards Rödermark-Ober Roden
Terminus	S8 (Rhine-Main S-Bahn)	Wiesbaden Ost towards Hanau Hbf
Terminus	S9 (Rhine-Main S-Bahn)	Wiesbaden Ost towards Hanau Hbf
Location

Wiesbaden Hauptbahnhof is a railway station for the city of Wiesbaden, the state capital of the German state of Hesse. It is a terminal station at the southern edge of the city centre and is used by more than 40,000 travelers each day, so it is the second largest station in Hesse after Frankfurt Hauptbahnhof. It is classified by Deutsche Bahn as a category 2 station.

== History ==
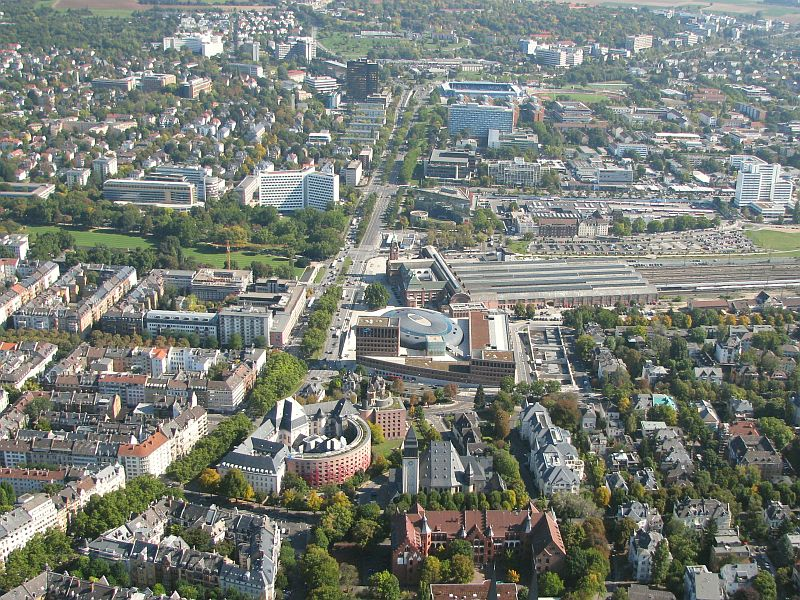
Aerial view of the railway station

The current station replaced three stations in the city centre, which were next to each other near the fairground (Rhein-Main-Hallen) and the Wiesbaden Museum. These were:

- The Taunusbahnhof (Taunus station), built in 1840 for the Taunus Railway (Wiesbaden–Castel–Höchst–Frankfurt (Taunusbahnhof).
- The Rheinbahnhof (Rhine station), built in 1857 for the East Rhine railway (Wiesbaden–Biebrich–Rüdesheim–Niederlahnstein).
- The Ludwigsbahnhof (Ludwig's Railway station), built in 1879 for the Ländches Railway (Wiesbaden-Niedernhausen).

A fourth railway line was added in 1889, connecting to the Rheinbahnhof, with the opening Langenschwalbach Railway (now the Aar Valley Railway—Aartalbahn) from the Rheinbahnhof in Wiesbaden to Bad Schwalbach (then called Langenschwalbach) and later extended to Diez on the Lahn.

The new station building became necessary to handle the growing number of passenger visiting the spa city at that time. It was built from 1904 to 1906 according to the plans of Fritz Klingholz in a flamboyant neo-baroque style that corresponded to an international style of architecture adopted for spa towns. It was also intended to welcome Kaiser Wilhelm II on his visit to the spa every May and a platform was established for him and other aristocrats. The first train ran into the new station on 15 November 1906 around 2:23 a.m. In the station building the relics of the former images of crowned heads, with the faces removed, can still be seen in many places.

The new Hauptbahnhof was located outside the town at the time of its building at the south-eastern end of the then newly constructed ring road (the Kaiser-Friedrich-Ring and the Bismarckring), which runs in an arc to the west of the historic pentagon (Historische Fünfeck) at the centre of Wiesbaden. During the period up to the First World War the town developed towards the new station.

On 25 September 1983, the Hauptbahnhof was affected by the closure of a line. Passenger services were discontinued between Wiesbaden and Bad Schwalbach on the Aar Valley Railway. One of the long-term consequences was the decommissioning and dismantling of station track 11 so that the station now has only 10 tracks.

Wiesbaden Hauptbahnhof was extensively refurbished and modernised at a cost of €25 million between 2003 and 2004. A redesign of the forecourt, costing €1.5 million, was carried out between mid-2006 and March 2007. The modernisation should have been completed with the opening of the high-speed line to Cologne, but was postponed several times due to lack of funds.

Next door is the Lilien-Carré shopping centre opened in March 2007 on the site of the former main post office.

As part of the economic stimulus package, the train shed roofs have been renovated at a cost of €35 million since late 2010.

=== Connection to the Cologne-Frankfurt high-speed line ===
Wiesbaden Hauptbahnhof is connected to the Cologne-Frankfurt high-speed line by the approximately 13.0 km long Breckenheim–Wiesbaden line opened in 2002.

This line had been subjected to extensive analysis and discussions by 1990. Three options were investigated:

- an alignment of the main route of the high-speed line through Wiesbaden station. This option was originally premised on the route of the line running generally along the eastern bank of the Rhine, which was rejected after exhaustive investigations. It examined possible connection to the current station:
  - by continuing to serve the terminal station,
  - with the construction of a new underground station deep near the existing station area, running north–south, and
  - with the construction of a new underground station, running east–west;
- an alignment on the eastern outskirts of Wiesbaden, with sub-variants with or without the construction of a new station. Possible station sites were tested in the Hainerberg district (more than a kilometre east of the Hauptbahnhof), near Wiesbaden Ost station and east of the Bierstadt district. Only in the case of Wiesbaden Ost was a link to the S-Bahn possible and in all three cases connections to public transport (especially buses) would have had to be changed.
- an alignment along the A3 to the east of Wiesbaden.

The option of running under the Wiesbaden city area with a station on a north–south orientation was dismissed. Overall, this option required an ascending 10.2 km tunnel. Also rejected was the east–west option as it would have required a tunnel that was located 30 to 100 m below the water table. The high pressure of ground water under parts of the city of Wiesbaden made this extremely difficult. Test bores on the route of the postulated tunnel found material that was penetrated by debris.

In August 1991, the state of Hesse, the city of Wiesbaden and the Deutsche Bundesbahn agreed to a ground-level connection running from the Hauptbahnhof via a link to the east to the new line. The realised Wiesbadener Kreuz (Wiesbaden Cross) option was accessed as having the best cost-benefit ratio. A major argument put forward in the assessment report was that the best way by far of generating passenger traffic would be a connection to the existing station and that only at Wiesbaden Hauptbahnhof would it be possible to give comprehensive access to public transport. Furthermore, the option largely agreed with the route promoted by nature conservation and environmental groups.

A proposed branch off the link along the A 66 and connecting to the high-speed line towards Frankfurt, which would be served only by regional services has not been realized. As part of the connection to the new line, a platform in Wiesbaden station was extended to the length of long ICE trains. The cost of €1.7 million were funded by the federal government.

Patronage of services on the line have been disappointing and services have been cut back from those originally operating so that there are now only two services each way on week days only.

== Architecture ==
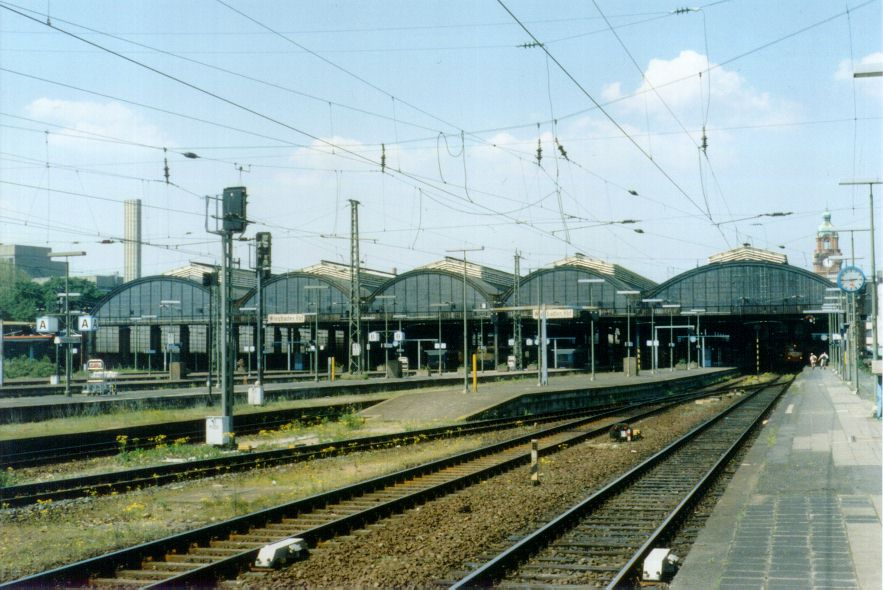
Train shed

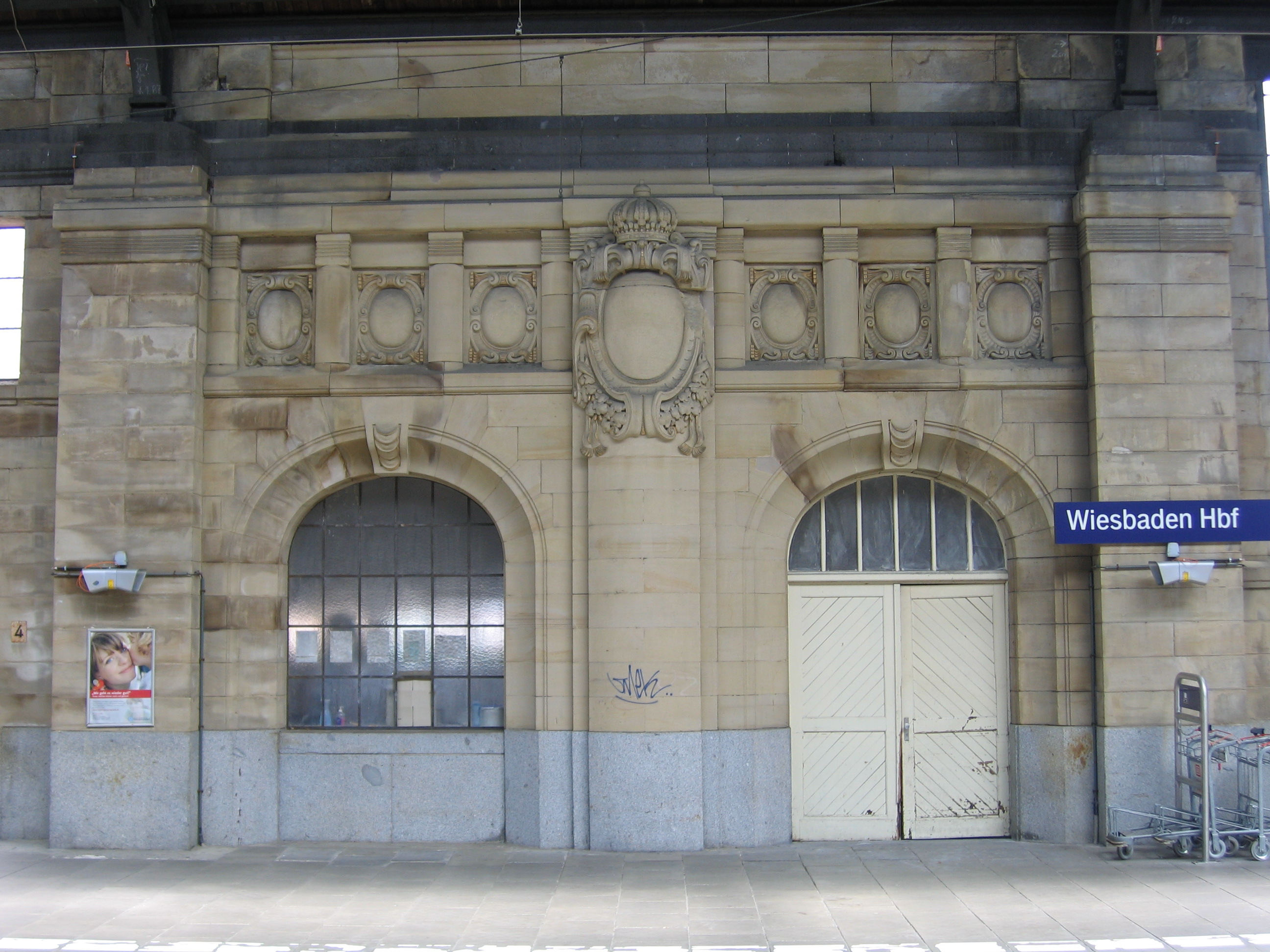
Entrance hall to royal pavilion (now destroyed) on track 1

The station building is connected to a five-span train-shed, originally with eleven tracks (now only ten are in operation), which are located in front of a broad vaulted concourse that extends eastward beyond the train-shed and at right angles to it to a vaulted lobby to the east of platform track 1.

The exterior is formed of red sandstone and has rich Baroque Revival forms. The highlight is the lobby on the eastern side, which has a 40-metre-high (130 ft) clock tower with a curved canopy. The former entrance on the western side is surmounted by a copper dome. The roof is adorned with green tiles.

The interior of the building is formed of yellow sandstone, in contrast to the exterior. The roof over the actual platform area consists of steel and glass.

During its renovation in 2004, the station was largely restored to its original appearance. The monumental nature of the concourse is now restored to its full advantage as distracting objects have been removed.

== Rail services ==
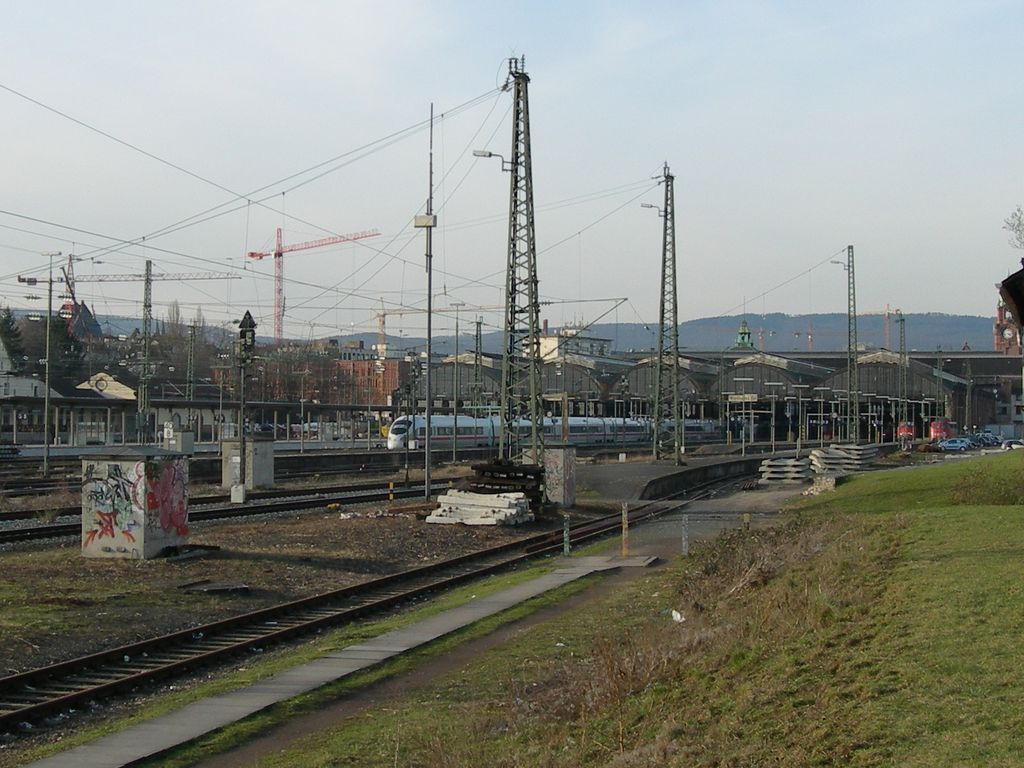
Station tracks, south side

It is served by the following long-distance services:

Line	Route	Frequency
ICE 11	Wiesbaden – Mainz – Worms – Mannheim – Stuttgart – Ulm – Augsburg – Munich	One train
ICE/ECE 20	Wiesbaden – Mainz – Frankfurt – Kassel-Wilhelmshöhe – Göttingen - Hannover – Hamburg – Hamburg-Altona	One train
ICE 25	Hamburg-Altona – Hamburg – Hannover – Göttingen – Kassel-Wilhelmshöhe – Frankfurt Hbf – Frankfurt Airport – Mainz Hbf – Wiesbaden Hbf	One train
ICE 41	Munich – Nuremberg – Würzburg – Fulda – Kassel-Wilhelmshöhe – Hamm – Dortmund – Duisburg – Düsseldorf – Köln Messe/Deutz – Wiesbaden Hbf – Frankfurt Airport – Frankfurt (Main) Hbf	One train (Mon–Fri)
ICE 42	Wiesbaden – Mainz – Worms – Mannheim – Stuttgart – Ulm – Augsburg – Munich	One train
ICE 45	Stuttgart – Vaihingen (Enz) – Heidelberg – Mannheim – Mainz – Wiesbaden – Limburg Süd – Montabaur – Siegburg/Bonn – (Cologne/Bonn Airport –) Cologne	One pair
ICE 45	Mainz – Wiesbaden – Limburg Süd – Montabaur – Cologne	One train (Mon–Fri)
ICE 50	Wiesbaden – Mainz – Frankfurt Airport – Frankfurt – Fulda – Eisenach – Erfurt – Leipzig – Dresden	Every 2 hours

=== Regional trains ===
The station is served by the following regional services:

Line	Route	Frequency
RB 10	RheingauLinie; Neuwied – Koblenz Stadtmitte – Koblenz – Rüdesheim (Rhein) – Wiesbaden – Frankfurt	Hourly (extra peak hour services)
RB 21	Ländchesbahn (Limburg (Lahn) – Bad Camberg –) Niedernhausen – Wiesbaden-Igstadt – Wiesbaden	Half hourly (hourly in evening and on weekends)
RB 33	Nahetalbahn; Wiesbaden Hbf – (Mainz Hbf –) Ingelheim – Bad Kreuznach (– Idar-Oberstein)	Individual services
RB 75	Rhein-Main-Bahn; Wiesbaden – Mainz – Bischofsheim – Groß Gerau – Weiterstadt – Darmstadt – Dieburg – Babenhausen – Aschaffenburg	Half hourly (hourly in evening and on weekends)

=== S-Bahn ===
The station is the terminus of three lines of the Rhine-Main S-Bahn:

Line	Route	Frequency
S1 (Rhine-Main S-Bahn)	Wiesbaden – Mainz-Kastel – Hattersheim (Main) – Frankfurt-Höchst – Frankfurt Hbf (underground) – Offenbach Ost – Rödermark - Ober-Roden	Half hourly
S8 (Rhine-Main S-Bahn)	Wiesbaden – Mainz – Bischofsheim – Rüsselsheim – Frankfurt Airport – Frankfurt Hbf (underground) – Offenbach Ost (– Mühlheim (Main) – Hanau)	Half hourly
S9 (Rhine-Main S-Bahn)	Wiesbaden – Mainz-Kastel – Bischofsheim – Rüsselsheim – Frankfurt Airport – Frankfurt Hbf (underground) – Offenbach (Main) Ost – Mühlheim (Main) – Hanau Hbf	Half hourly

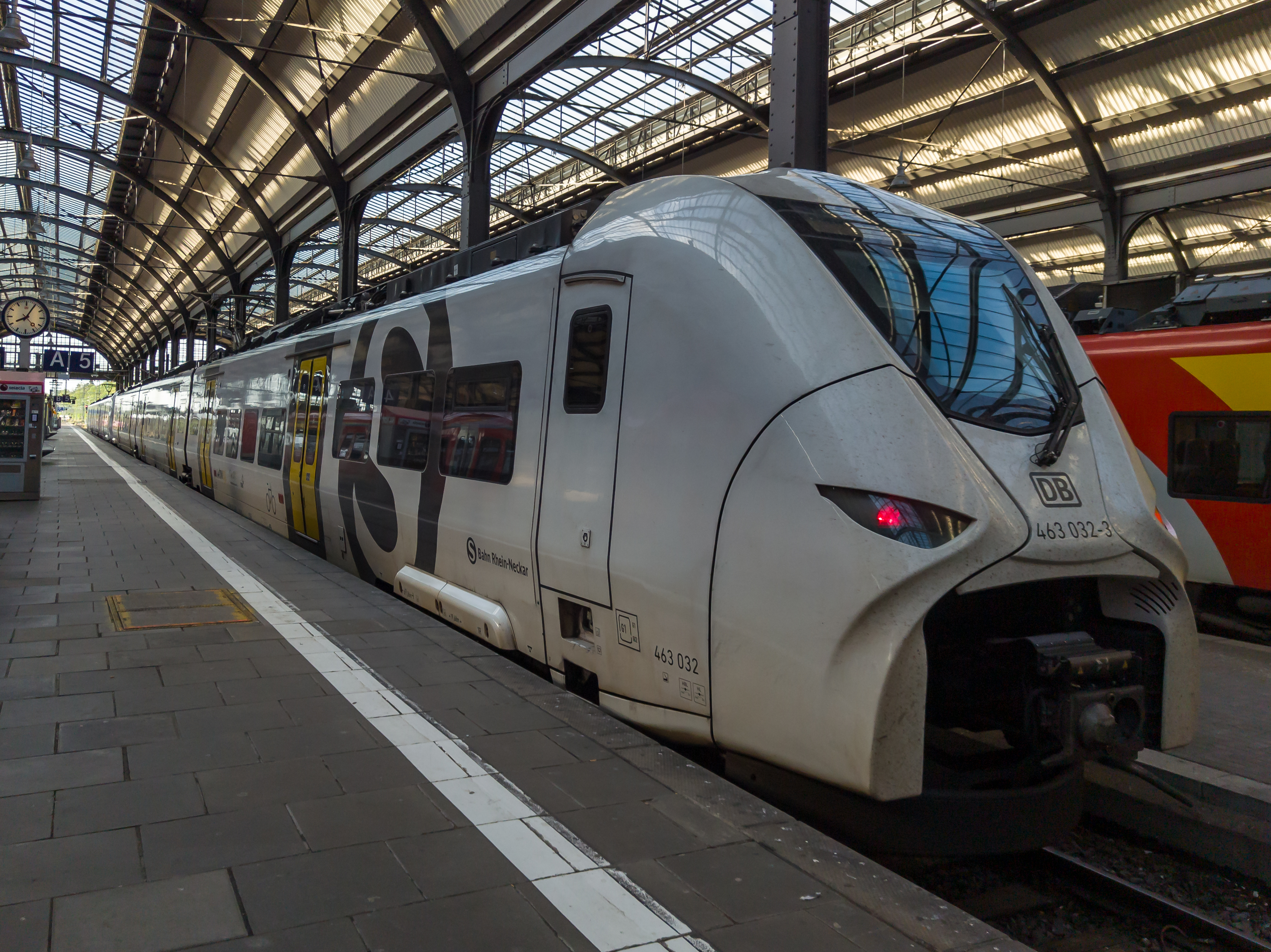
Line S6 of the Rhine-Neckar S-Bahn occasionally serves Wiesbaden in case of interruptions of other lines as an alternate terminus.

== See also ==
- Rail transport in Germany
- Railway stations in Germany
