= Breckenheim–Wiesbaden railway =

Railway line

Overview
- Line number: 3509
- Locale: Hesse, Germany

Technical
- Line length: 13 km (8.1 mi)
- Track gauge: 1,435 mm (4 ft 8 1/2 in) standard gauge
- Electrification: 15 kV/16.7 Hz AC overhead catenary
- Operating speed: 160 km/h (99.4 mph) (maximum)

The Breckenheim–Wiesbaden railway is a 13-kilometre (8.1 mi) long railway line in the vicinity of the Hessian state capital of Wiesbaden. It connects the Cologne–Frankfurt high-speed rail line with Wiesbaden Central Station.

The double-track line was built from the late 1990s as a new line. It was completed in December 2002. With a scheduled train service of two long-distance pairs each day on the section between Kinzenberg and Breckenheim junctions, it is one of the least-congested sections of railway in Germany. This section is not used by either regional passenger or freight traffic.

The total cost of construction of the line amounted to €279 million. It was originally estimated to cost €29 million less. The additional costs were assumed by Deutsche Bahn.

== Route ==
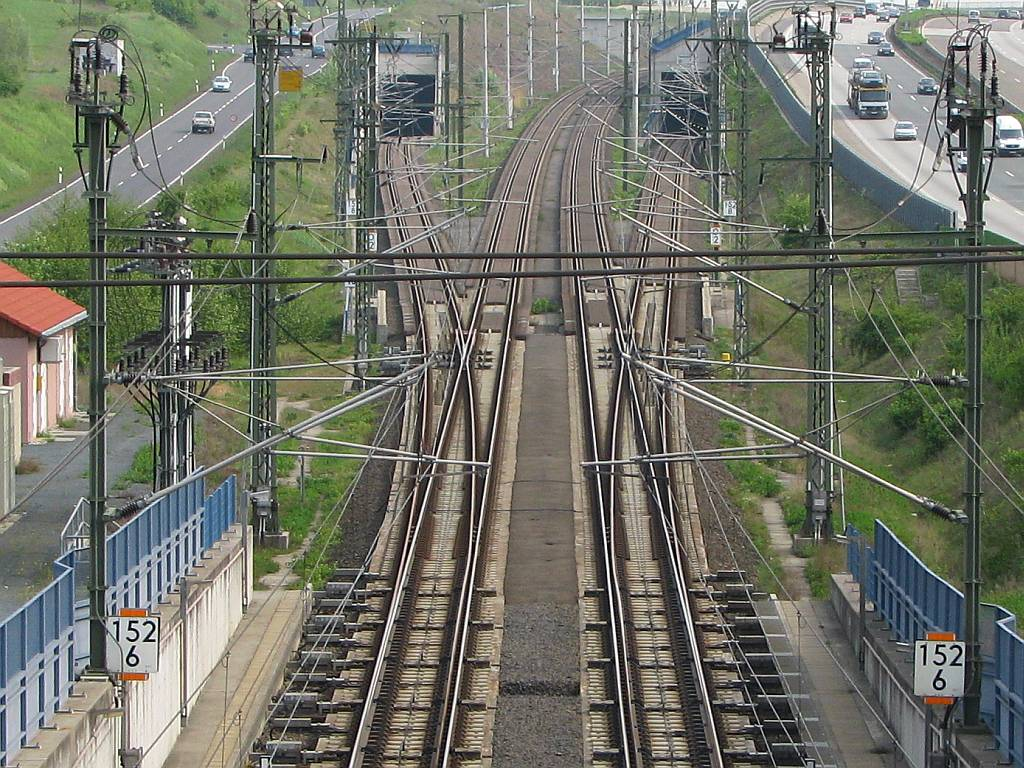
Separation from the high-speed line at Breckenheim junction, south of Breckenheim Tunnel. While the new line runs towards Frankfurt (central tracks), the track from Wiesbaden joins on the left and the line to Wiesbaden sepaprates on the right. Nearby to the south are to the two portals of the Wandersmann North Tunnel.

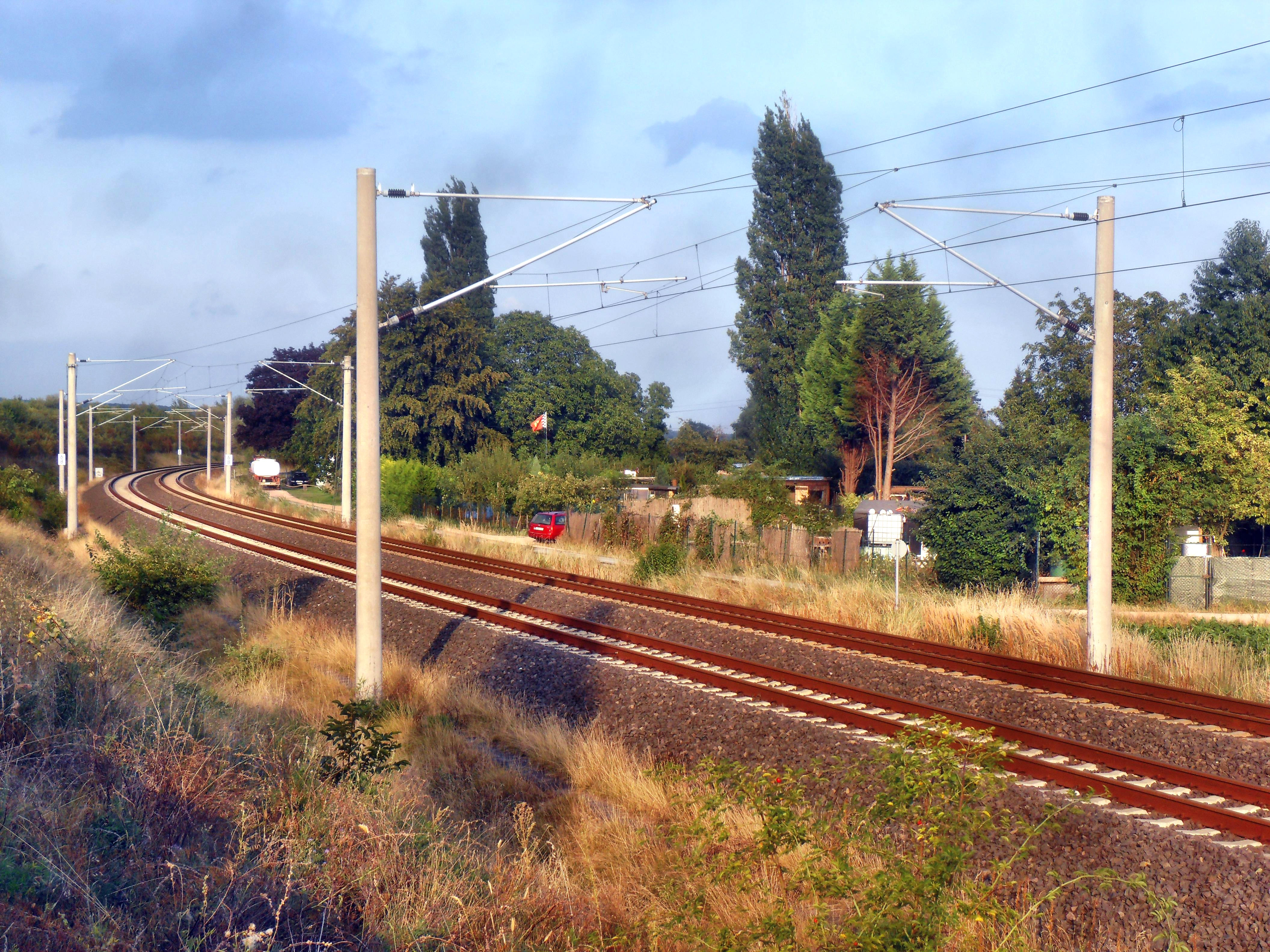
Line near the 7.0 km mark on the line

The line branches off the Cologne–Frankfurt high-speed line at Breckenheim junction near the Wiesbaden Cross autobahn junction on the A 3 autobahn, which it passes under in Wandersmann North Tunnel. After running through a short section of trough (with concrete walls) near Wallau it runs through the Wandersmann South Tunnel, passing under the A 66 autobahn. It resurfaces west of the Wallau autobahn junction. The route runs parallel to the A 66 through Nordenstadt on the northern edge of Lucius D. Clay Kaserne (a U.S. base formerly called the Wiesbaden Army Airfield) to Erbenheim. At the 10 kilometre mark from Breckenheim junction, it connects with the Ländches Railway (Ländchesbahn), which it follows to Wiesbaden Central Station and reaches at the 13 kilometre mark.

== History ==
The connection from Wiesbaden to the new line was planned under various options for the Cologne-Rhine/Main high-speed line under discussion during the 1980s. Only in the case of a purely left-bank route (to the west of the Rhine) was a link not provided to Wiesbaden. The Hessian state government considered that a remote link to the Wiesbaden would be inadequate. The forecasts in the 1990s were that more than 1,000 passengers a day would use high-speed services to Wiesbaden.

The (ultimately realised) right bank route between Cologne and Frankfurt along the A 3 initially provided for a connection from Niedernhausen to Wiesbaden Central Station. This required the construction of an 11 kilometre long tunnel between the northern edge of the city and the station. This option was originally analysed with a maximum grade of 2.5 percent, which was subsequently increased to 4 percent. The city of Wiesbaden suggested that the continuation of the route to Frankfurt be abandoned and that all trains run via Wiesbaden Central Station and from there run on existing (partially upgraded) lines. Deutsche Bundesbahn (DB) examined numerous route options between the Niedernhausen-Wiesbaden Central Station route and a corridor between Niedernhausen and Wiesbaden Cross (along the A 3). Primary emphasis was placed on a grade of up to 4.0 percent. A variant developed at this time envisaged, for example, the building of a station between Bierstadt and Erbenheim, east of the settlement of Hainerberg. South of Erbenheim station there would be a branch line. Geological studies showed significant geological problems with a route running under Bierstadt and the Salzbach valley. DB then distanced itself from such variations, looking for geologically favourable solutions, even if they required trains to reverse in the central station. From a variety of route options, three were examined closely:

- A variant of an option that DB had examined before with the high-speed line running from the north along the A 3 with a branch line running from the vicinity of Wiesbaden Cross to Wiesbaden. It would reach Wiesbaden Central Station by running along the A 66 and the Ländches Railway between Wiesbaden and Niedernhausen.
- The so-called "Best Wiesbaden Solution" (Beste Wiesbadener Lösung) was left as the most favourable of the options that would provide a new line through Wiesbaden Central Station. From Wiesbaden Central Station, the route would follow the A 66 to Wiesbaden's Cross and from there run to Frankfurt Airport. While parts of the railway would be in cuttings, it would run through the city of Wiesbaden in a continuous tunnel.
- The so-called "Hainerberg variant" envisaged a route parallel with the B 455 with a new station near Hainerberg. South of this point the line would branch towards Wiesbaden and Frankfurt. This variant was assessed as having a large potential for urban development in eastern Wiesbaden, but would have reduced traffic to Wiesbaden Central Station.

In a summit meeting between DB, the state of Hesse and the Wiesbaden city council, the Hainerberg variant was discarded, while DB agreed to develop the other two variants equally and bring them into the regional planning process. As part of the process the "Best Wiesbaden Solution" was ultimately rejected due to the unacceptable time and effort required for its planning and for architectural and geological reasons. There was a threat from ground water at the edge of the Taunus that had not previously been seen with this intensity on a high-speed line in Germany. An expert hired by the city confirmed the DB results. The city of Wiesbaden finally developed a so-called "optimised spatial route" (optimierte Raumordnungstrasse) with a triangle: in addition to the new line a branch would run to the southwest with provision for a connecting link to the southeast, which would be included in the regional planning and planning approval processes. While DB wanted to use this link to enhance regional passenger rail transport, the city of Wiesbaden wanted the link to be used by long-distance rail services.

=== Planning ===
In the planning approval process, the line was part of Section 33.2 (connection with the high-speed line) and 34.1/34.2 (Wiesbaden Central Station area).

At the demand of the U.S. military, part of the route was shifted 15 metres to the north (away from the Wiesbaden Army Airfield). In addition, at the end of 1996, the U.S. military required that the control tower be able to stop the train traffic next to the airport. An agreement at the beginning of 1977 envisaged that the control tower would control a signal controlling the approach of trains.

During the planning, the construction of a previously agreed by-pass road around Wallau was considered for inclusion in the project. DBBauProjekt, which had already been commissioned to design the new line, was also contracted to design the road and to implement the first stage of the bypass.

Initially it was planned to build the line as a single-track and at a later stage to build the second track. In mid-1998, it was announced that the connecting curve would be constructed with two tracks and opened at the same time as the Cologne-Rhine/Main high-speed line. With the commissioning of the high-speed line there would initially be a regular interval Intercity-Express (ICE) service from Wiesbaden and later, if there was a sufficient volume of traffic, two services. The estimated additional cost of the second track amounted to 12 million Deutschmarks (about €6 million).

In the 1990s, two pairs of trains per hour were planned for the connection to Wiesbaden. From mid-1998 only one hourly train pair was planned.

In the course of the route planning, a connecting curve between Erbenheim and Wiesbaden East, which would have run along the route of the freight rail line abandoned in 1997 and would have allowed direct operations between the high-speed line and Mainz Central Station (bypassing Wiesbaden Central Station), was not realised. The reason was low estimated traffic demand.

=== Construction ===
The track was built as part of the section C contract, covering the central section of the new line. The part between Erbenheim and Wiesbaden was assigned to the southern section of the new line.

=== Operations ===
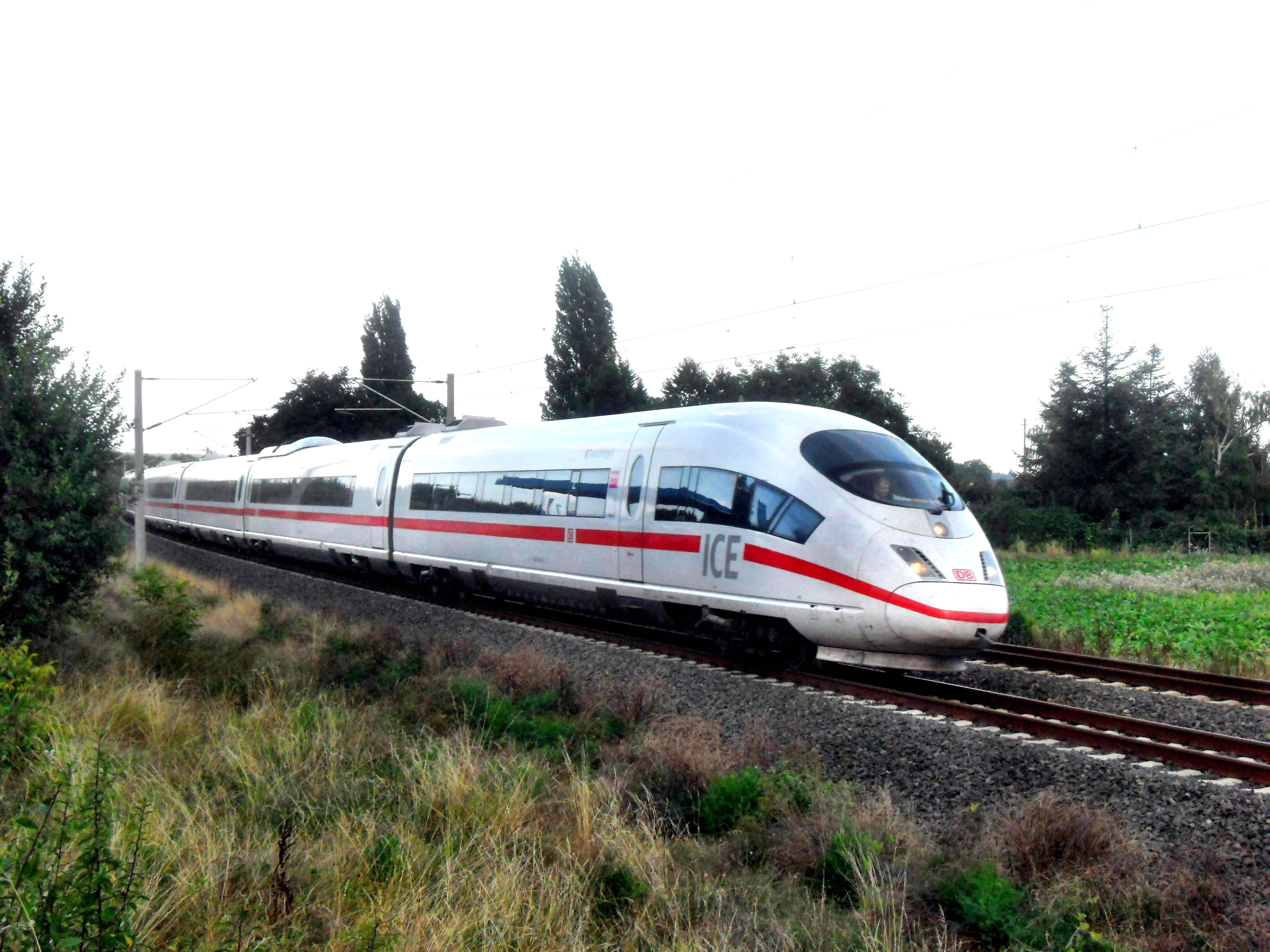
ICE 3 near Wiesbaden-Erbenheim, running towards Wiesbaden

The number of trains running on the Breckenheim–Wiesbaden line has been reduced in several stages since the opening of the line. At the beginning of operations in December 2002, eight pairs of ICE services per day ran between Wiesbaden and Mainz, in the 2005 timetable it was reduced to five and from June 2006 to four. From December 2007, three pairs of trains running via Wiesbaden remained. DB runs said that the low passenger numbers was the reason for the cuts. In autumn 2008, the ICE services running between Cologne and Wiesbaden were, according to Deutsche Bahn, occupied by an average of 88 passengers. They were thus to be the least loaded ICE trains operated by DB. The trains carry more than 440 seats. Since the timetable change in December 2008, two pairs of service remain, running only from Monday to Friday.

The loading of ICE services terminating in Wiesbaden ranges from 3 to 20 percent.

=== Future ===
Given the low utilisation of the line and the desirability of improving access from Wiesbaden to Frankfurt Airport, the city of Wiesbaden is seeking the construction of the proposed southern curve at Wallau. This two kilometre link would branch off near the Hofheim-Wallau autobahn junction to the southeast and connect to the high-speed line running south. The travel time between Wiesbaden and Frankfurt Airport would be reduced from 28–39 minutes today to about 15 minutes. The costs were calculated in the 1990s to be about 100 million marks and they were estimated in 2007 to cost €65 million.

== Engineering ==
The tracks are partly on slab track (Rheda-Dywidag system). The two turnouts at Breckenheim junction are each 138 m long and weigh 500 tons, allowing branching speeds of up to 160 km/h (4,000 m radius). The switch blades are 54 metres long. It is the largest turnout on the whole Cologne-Rhine/Main high-speed line project.

The speed limit on the line is 40 km/h at the exit from the Wiesbaden Central Station and shortly later (at the 13.1 km mark) climbs to 100 km/h. At Wiesbaden Kinzenberg junction (km 9.9) the speed over the junction is 155–160 km/h. The line is equipped from the 4.9 km mark with the Linienzugbeeinflussung train protection system.
