= Ländchen =

Coordinates: 50°5′N 8°22′E

The Ländchen (German pronunciation: [ˈlɛntçən]) was a region east of Wiesbaden, Germany that comprised ten villages: Breckenheim, Delkenheim, Diedenbergen, Igstadt, Langenhain, Massenheim, Medenbach, Nordenstadt, Wallau, and Wildsachsen, plus Domäne Mechtildshausen.

Ländchen was a Hessian territory for about 300 years. It was bounded by the County of Nassau to the west and the territory of the Archbishopric of Mainz to the east. (It is distinct from the Blue Ländchen at Nastätten.)

Breckenheim, Delkenheim, Igstadt, Medenbach, and Nordenstadt are now boroughs of Wiesbaden. Domäne Mechtildshausen is also part of the borough of Wiesbaden-Erbenheim. Diedenbergen, Langenhain, Wallau, and Wildsachsen are now boroughs of Hofheim am Taunus. Massenheim is a borough of Hochheim am Main. The Ländchen gives its name to a railway line, the Ländchesbahn, which traverses this territory.

== History ==
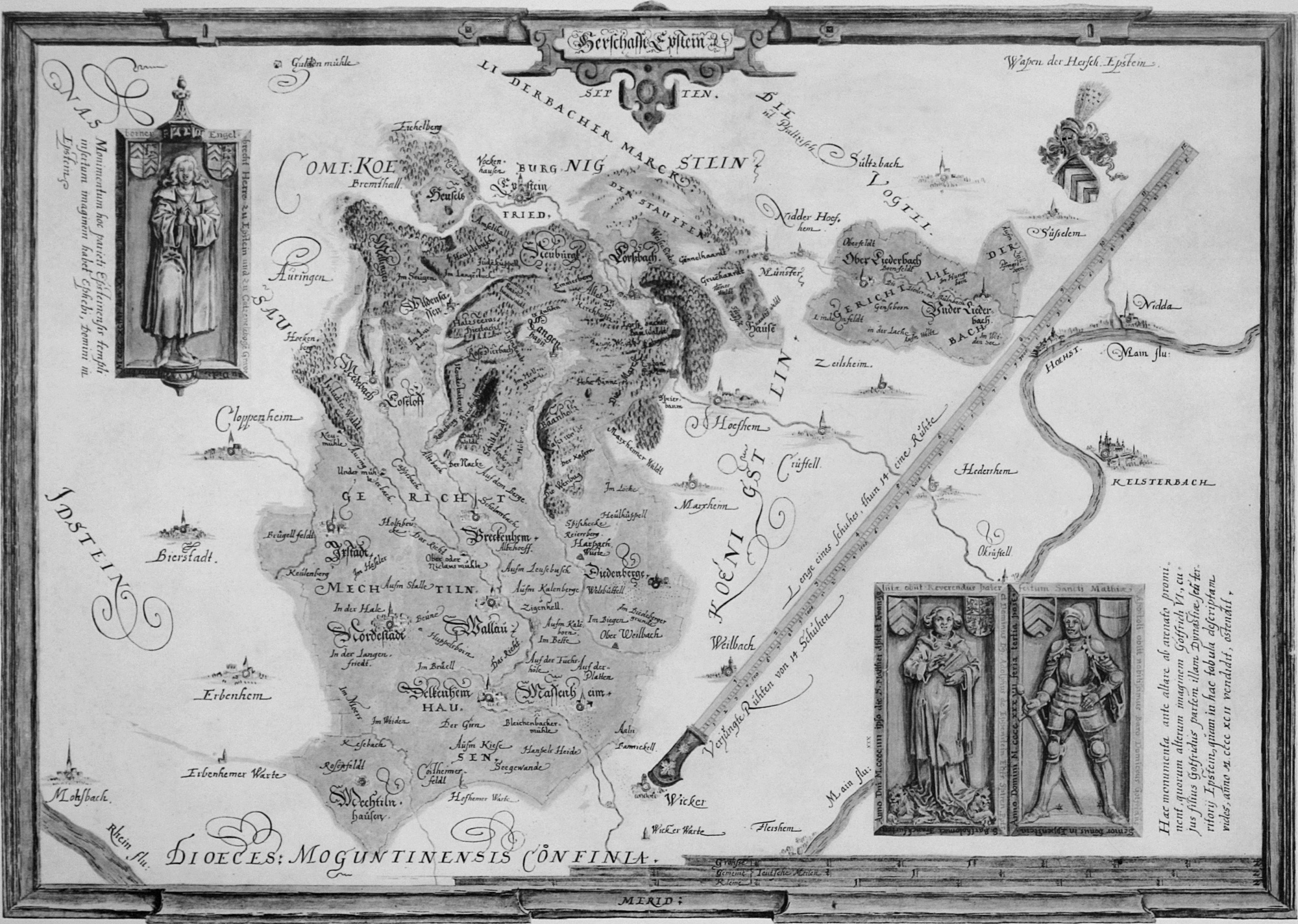
Territory of Eppstein in 1607, shown in a map by Wilhelm Dilich

The Ländchen was sold by Count Gottfried IX (X) of Eppstein-Münzenberg in 1492 to the Landgrave William III "The Younger" of Hesse. In 1526, Landgrave Philipp I "the Magnanimous" led the population to Protestantism. Until the 20th century, the Ländchen was a purely Protestant territory. Thus, the census of December 1, 1910 counted only 248 Catholics and 133 Jews among its 7818 inhabitants.

In the Thirty Years War, the population fell to just 400 citizens in 1630. By 1821, the population was up to 4805.

As a result of the Secularization of 1803, the Ländchen, as well as the adjacent territories of the Archbishopric of Mainz, were given to the Principality of Nassau-Usingen (which would become part of the Duchy of Nassau in 1806).

== Sources ==
- H. Diefenbach: Das Ländchen, in Karl Jacobi (Hrsg.): Nassauisches Heimatbuch. Gebrüder Petmecky, Wiesbaden, 1913.
