= Vectus Verkehrsgesellschaft =

Vectus Verkehrsgesellschaft mbH
- Type: Gesellschaft mit beschränkter Haftung
- Industry: Rail transport
- Headquarters: Limburg an der Lahn, Germany
- Area served: Rhein-Main-Verkehrsverbund; Verkehrsverbund Rhein-Mosel, Verkehrsverbund Rhein-Sieg
- Key people: Bernhard Maßberg, Veit Salzmann, Horst Klein
- Owner: 74.9 % Hessische Landesbahn GmbH; 25.1 % Westerwaldbahn GmbH of the Altenkirchen district
- Number of employees: 75

Vectus Verkehrsgesellschaft mbH ("Vectus Transportation Company", from Latin vectus: "carried") was a German transport company based in Limburg an der Lahn. In 2004, it took over the operation of a regional rail network located in the Lahn valley, the Westerwald and the Taunus, which is called the Westerwald-Taunus network. The operations of the network focused on Limburg. In 2014, the contract for these services were awarded to its main shareholder, Hessische Landesbahn (HLB) and Vectus Verkehrsgesellschaft was subsequently taken over by HLB.

== Foundation ==
Vectus was founded on 23 July 2003. Its shareholders were the Hessische Landesbahn GmbH with 74.9% and the Westerwaldbahn GmbH with 25.1% of the shares. Both were partners in a consortium that won a concession on 14 November 2002 against numerous competitors—including DB Regio—to operate a roughly 218 km long railway network in the states of Hesse and Rhineland-Palatinate for a period of ten years. The operating concession was signed on 10 January 2003 with the Zweckverband Schienenpersonennahverkehr Rheinland-Pfalz Nord ("purpose association for rail transport of Rhineland-Palatinate North", SPNV Nord) and Rhein-Main-Verkehrsverbund (Rhine-Main Transport Association, RMV). The SPNV Nord is also responsible for sections of line in southern North Rhine-Westphalia. Vectus took over the operations at the timetable change in December 2004, using 28 new vehicles and 70 staff.

In October 2012, HLB was awarded the contract for the future operations of the Westerwald network and commenced operations at the end of Vectus’ ten-year contract in 2014. The contract for the operation of the Taunus network was taken over by DB Regio. The operations centre in Limburg closed in mid-2015 and subsequently Vectus Verkehrsgesellschaft mbH was dissolved. All railcars were taken over by Hessische Landesbahn and they are only maintained occasionally in the Limburg workshop since 2015.

== Routes ==
=== Regular train service ===
The routes operated by Vectus—with the regional service numbers of the RMV—were as follows:

Line number	Line	Route
RB 20	Main-Lahn railway	Limburg (Lahn) – Eschhofen – Niederbrechen – Bad Camberg – Idstein – Niedernhausen
RB 21	Ländches Railway	Niedernhausen – Wiesbaden-Erbenheim – Wiesbaden Hbf
RB 25	Lahntal railway	Limburg (Lahn) – Diez – Nassau – Bad Ems – Niederlahnstein – Koblenz Hbf Limburg (Lahn) – Weilburg – Wetzlar – Gießen partly, on behalf of the Hessischen Landesbahn
RB 28	Upper Westerwald Railway	Limburg (Lahn) – Diez Ost – Staffel – Hadamar – Westerburg – Nistertal-Bad Marienberg – Hachenburg – Altenkirchen – Au (Sieg)
RB 29	Lower Westerwald Railway	Limburg (Lahn) – Diez Ost – Staffel – Elz Süd – Montabaur – Wirges – Siershahn

Limburg (Lahn) station was the junction where Vectus services connected with the services of Deutsche Bahn. It operated services on the Main-Lahn Railway to Frankfurt and Regional-Express services on the Lahntal railway. There were also buses from the Limburg (Lahn) station connecting to Limburg Süd station. Connections to the long distance train network existed in Limburg Süd station, Wiesbaden Hbf, Koblenz Hbf as well as Montabaur station.

=== Special trains ===
In 2005, a special train ride took place on the Siershahn-Altenkirchen section of Engers-Au railway (Holzbachtalbahn) as a test ride, for which a Cordia Lint 41 vehicle of the Vectus Verkehrsgesellschaft has been used. In the following year, the interest group IG Westerwald-Querbahn e. V. (IWQ) continued with a special train ride on the same railway line, but with an other vehicle.

== Gallery ==
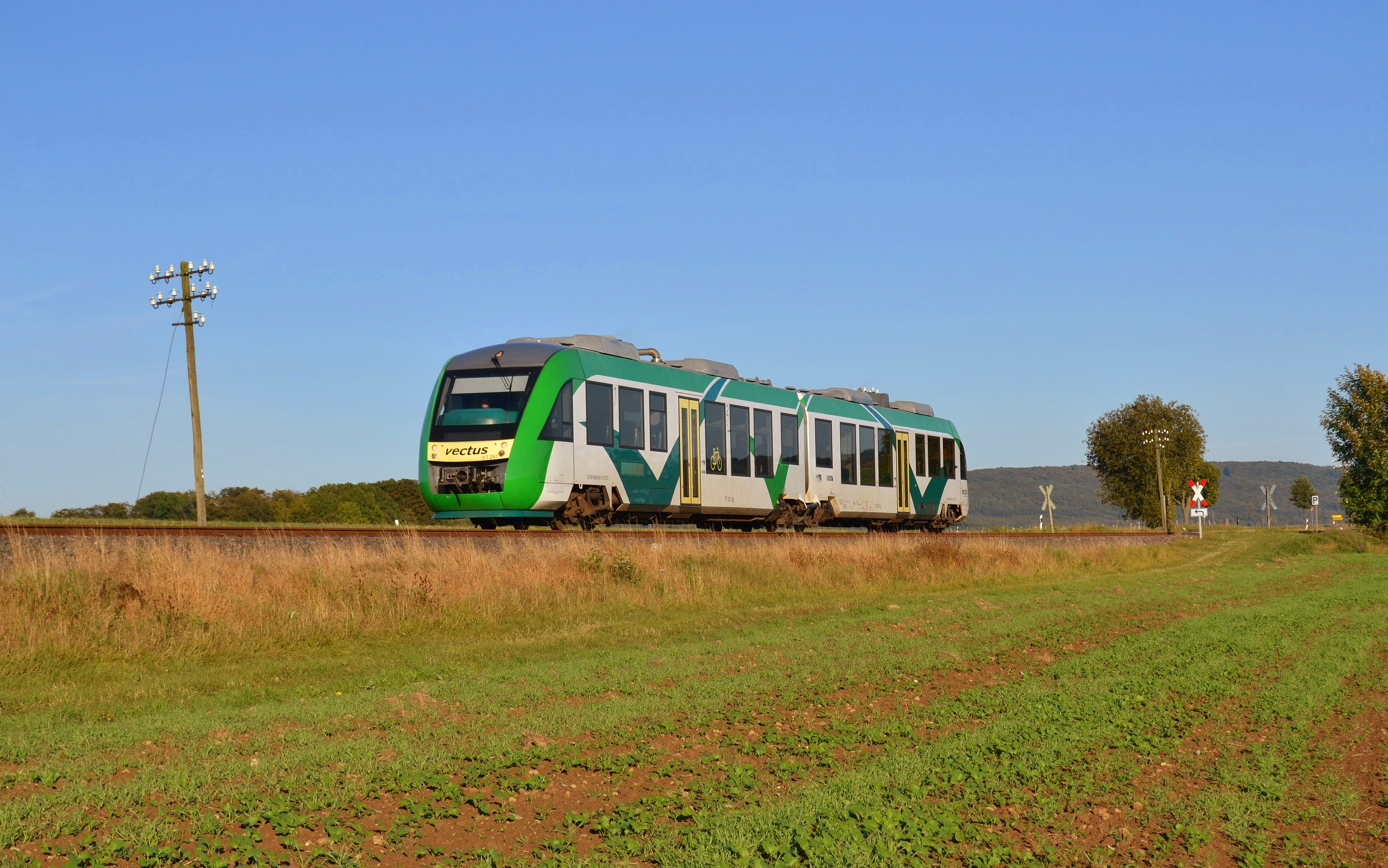
LINT 41 railcar of Vectus running on the Upper Westerwald Railway to Hachenburg

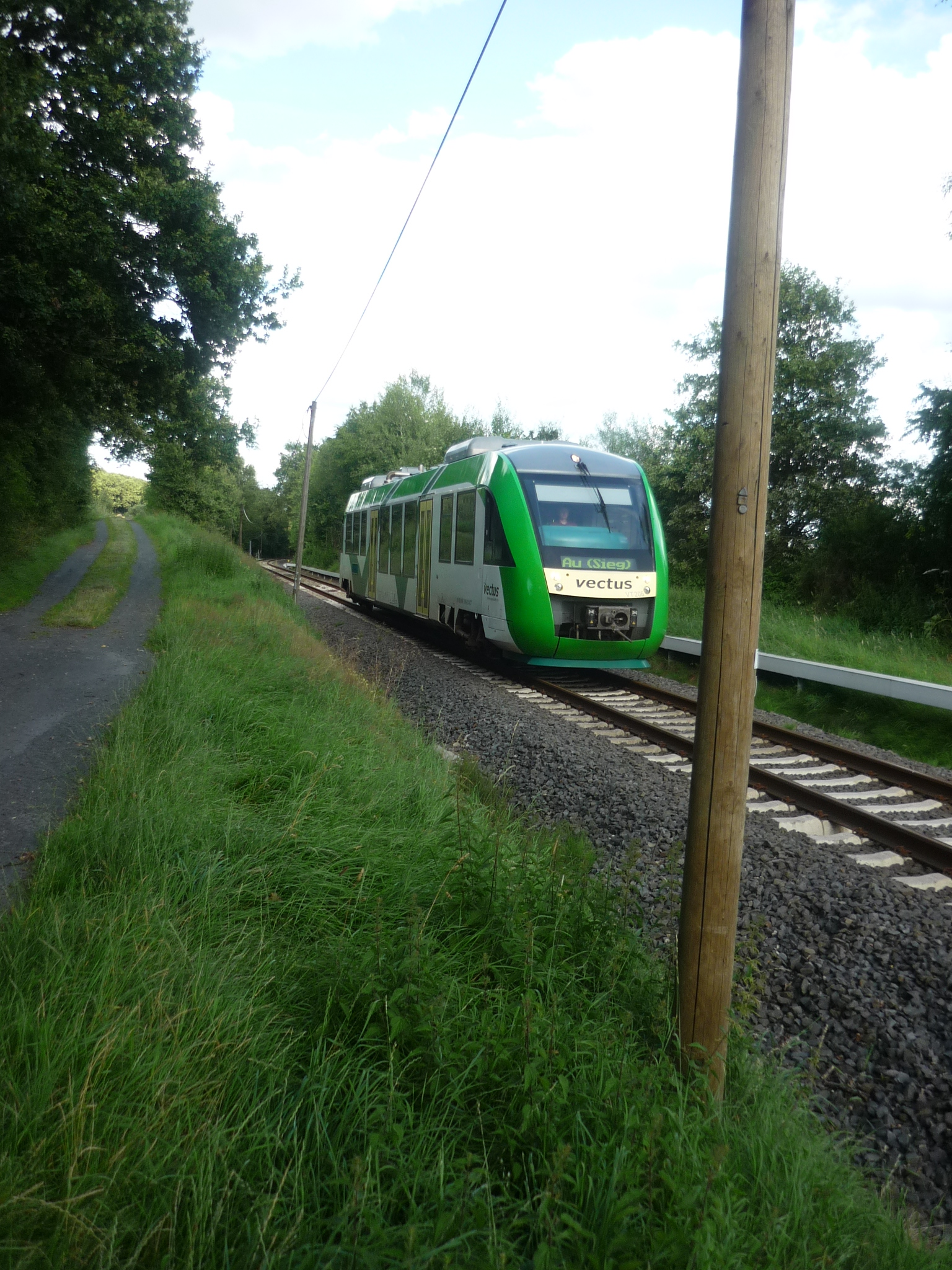
Alstom Coradia LINT 27 railcar of Vectus running on the Upper Westerwald Railway to Ingelbach

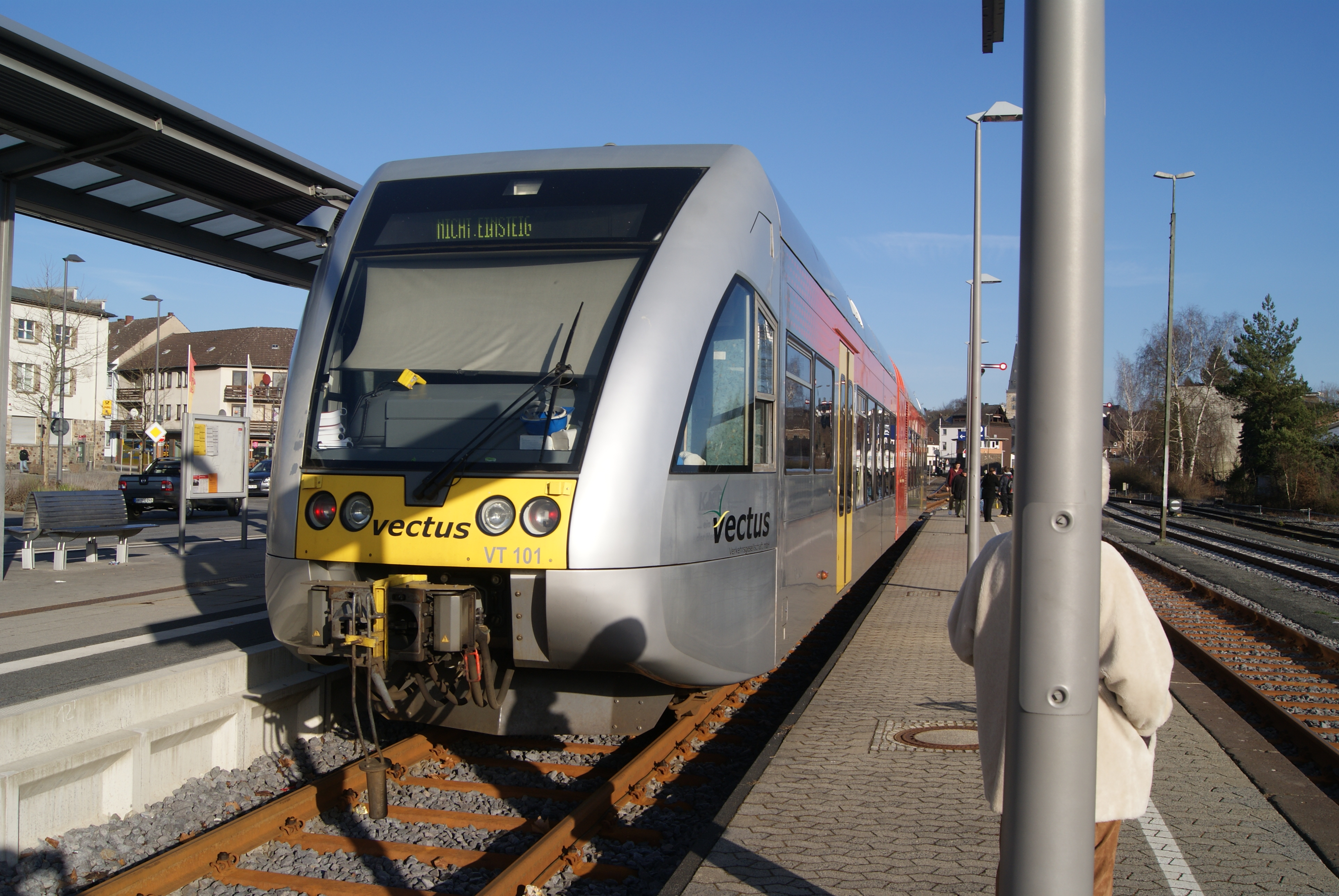
One of the 3 Stadler GTW railcars of Vectus in Altenkirchen station on the Upper Westerwald Railway

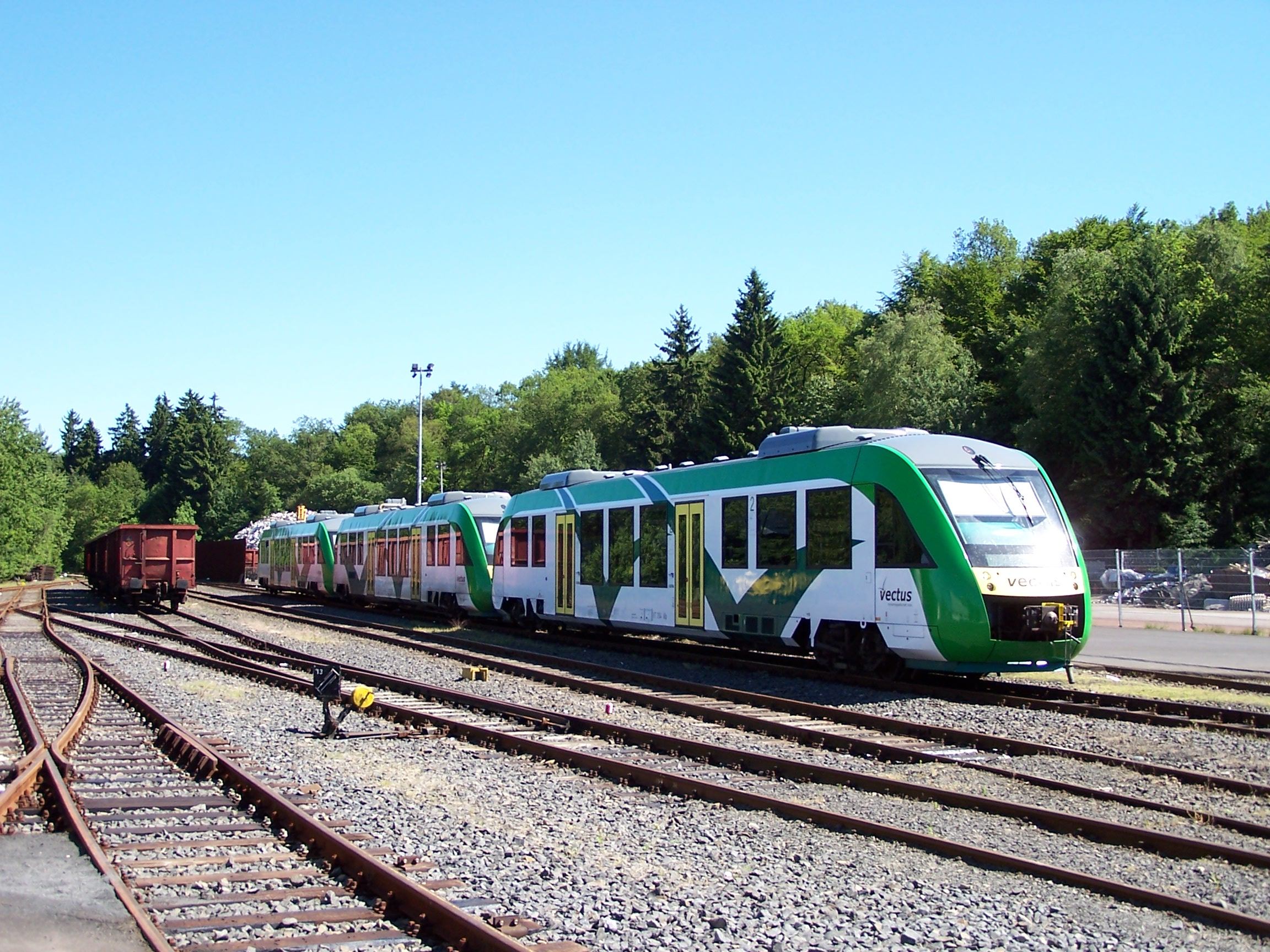
Three LINT 27 railcars in Steinebach-Bindweide depot of the Scheuerfeld–Emmerzhausen railway

== Rolling stock ==
Vectus operated a total of 2.4 million train-km per year, using 10 Alstom Coradia LINT 27 diesel railcars and 18 Alstom Coradia LINT 41 railcars. All vehicles were built in 2004 and were identical to the class 640 and 648 railcars of Deutsche Bahn. After the delivery of the first railcars, some ran on the Limburg–Wiesbaden line and other routes in the summer of 2004.

In addition Vectus had three Stadler GTW diesel railcars that it acquired from its parent company, HLB, in compensation for three LINT 27 railcars it transferred to HLB.

== Fares ==
For the sections in Hesse, the fare of the Rhein-Main-Verkehrsverbund (RMV) has applied, (also in Diez Ost station because it's only reachable from the RMV-area), for the other sections in Rhineland-Palatinate (except Westerwaldkreis because this district uses the VRM-fare since 2016), the fare of the transport associations Verkehrsverbund Rhein-Mosel (VRM) and for Geilhausen stop and Au (Sieg) station in Windeck the fare of the Verkehrsverbund Rhein-Sieg (VRS), nowadays: Rheinland-Tarif.
