= Ländchen Railway =

Railway line in Germany

Overview
- Native name: Ländchesbahn
- Line number: 3501
- Locale: Hesse, Germany
- Termini: Wiesbaden Hbf; Niedernhausen (Taunus)

Service
- Route number: 627

Technical
- Line length: 19.6 km (12.2 mi)
- Track gauge: 1,435 mm (4 ft 8 1/2 in) standard gauge
Route map
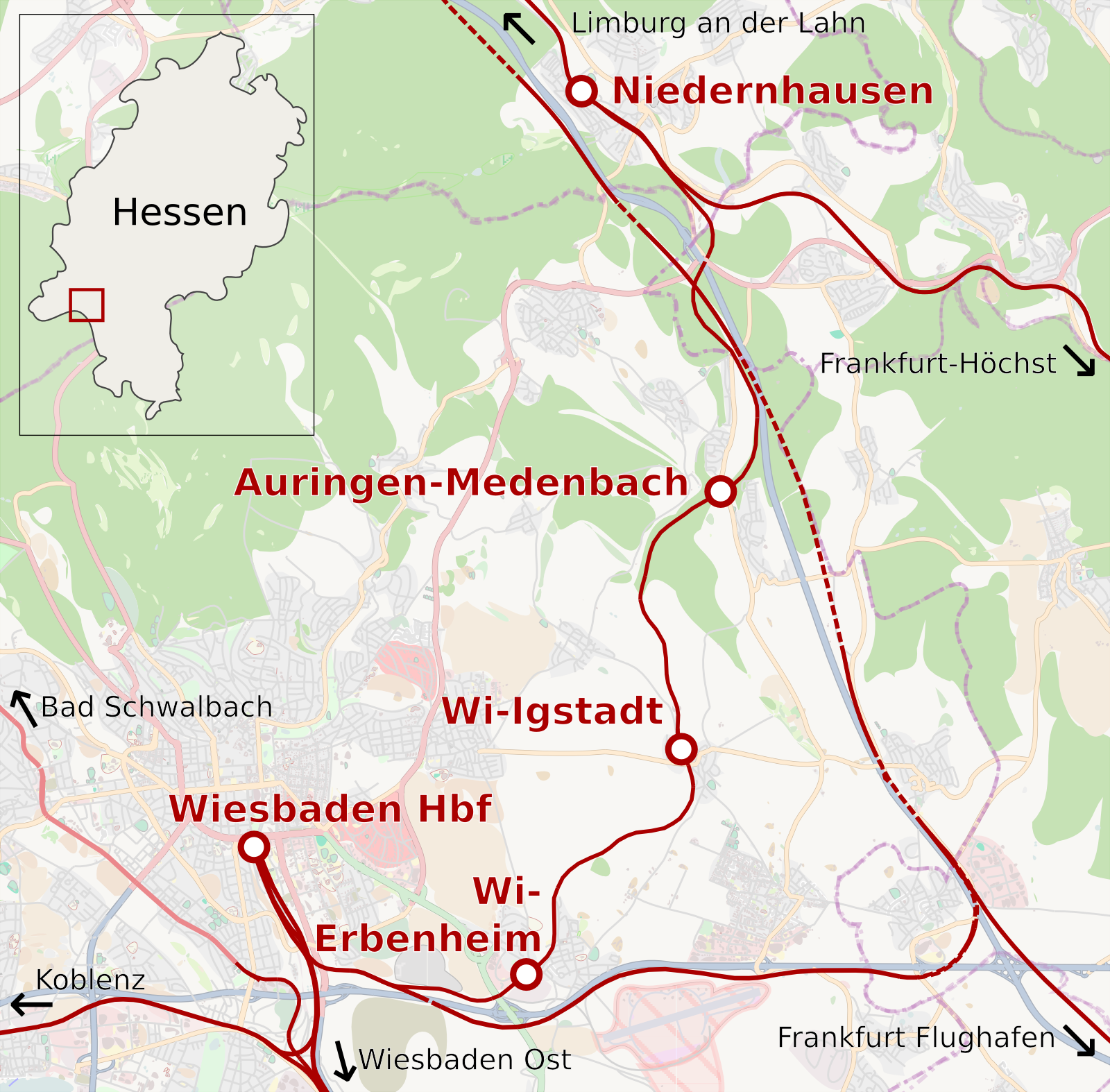
- Source: German railway atlas

The Ländchen Railway (German: Ländchesbahn, pronounced [ˈlɛntçəsˌbaːn]) is a single-track non-electrified branch railway line between Wiesbaden and Niedernhausen, in the German state of Hesse. The 19.6-kilometre (12.2 mi) long line was opened in 1879. It is now Deutsche Bahn route 627 and route 21 (RB 21) of the Rhein-Main-Verkehrsverbund.

== History ==
The Hessian Ludwig Railway (Hessische Ludwigsbahn) opened the Main-Lahn Railway, which passes through Niedernhausen, in 1877. The Ländches Railway was built to provide a connection from Niedernhausen to Wiesbaden, where the Taunus Railway and the Right Rhine Railway ended. It was opened together with the Ludwigsbahnhof (Ludwig station) on 1 July 1879. The line's approach to Wiesbaden was rebuilt over more than six kilometres to enable the construction of Wiesbaden Hauptbahnhof. This new section went into operation in 1904 and a link was opened to the Wiesbaden Süd express freight yard in 1906. With the opening of Wiesbaden Hauptbahnhof in 1906, the Ludwigsbahnhof was closed and the line shortened by about a kilometre. After the opening of the racecourse on the grounds of today's airfield in Erbenheim, trains ran to Erbenheim on race days, at ten-minute intervals at the busiest times.

On 1 October 1907, responsibility for the line was transferred from the railway division (Eisenbahndirektionen) of Frankfurt to the division of Mainz.

== Route ==
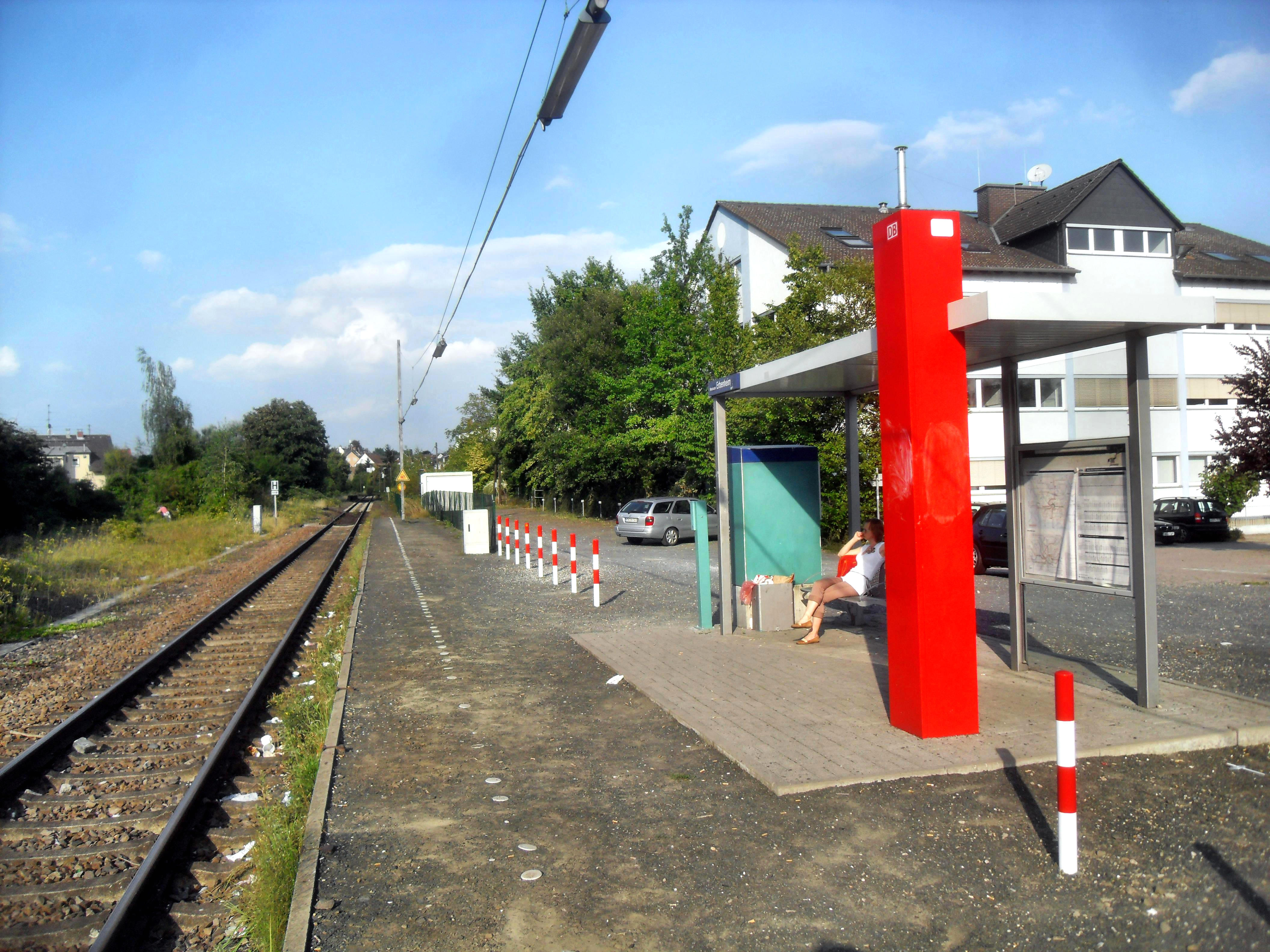
Wiesbaden-Erbenheim station on the Ländches Railway

The line originally began at the Ludwig Station (Ludwigsbahnhof) on Rheinstrasse in Wiesbaden, near the Taunus Station. In 1906, this station (as well as the Taunus Station) were replaced with the current Wiesbaden Hauptbahnhof (main or central station). The route now begins on the west side of the Central Station and crosses, in the vicinity of the Hammermühle, the tracks to and from Wiesbaden-East and Wiesbaden-Biebrich. Originally, a freight line from Wiesbaden-East paralleled the Ländches Railway from this overpass to the Wiesbaden Army Airfield in Erbenheim, so that the two-way tracks were side by side on the same embankment, almost to the Erbenheim passenger station. In 2002 the freight route was closed and the section from the Wiesbaden Hauptbahnhof to shortly before Erbenheim was used for the Cologne–Frankfurt high-speed rail line. This section, covering relatively flat terrain in the Wäschbach valley, is now double-tracked and electrified.

From Wiesbaden-Erbenheim, the route goes through the Ländchen, from which it takes its name. The elevation rises steadily to the north. North of the Auringen/Medenbach station, the line passes underneath the Cologne–Frankfurt HSL and then enters the 197-metre (646 ft) long "Grauer-Stein" tunnel beneath Bundesautobahn 3 and Bundesstraße 455. The railway tunnel, which was built in 1878, was completely renewed from 1998 to 2000 for reasons of operational safety. The tunnel was originally designed for double track operation, but has had only one track since its opening. The large cross-section and the fact that the tunnel will continue to be used by only a single track allowed the construction of a new reinforced concrete inner tube with an all-round seal inside the old sandstone lining. Since the renovation work could take place only during the night and on weekends while operations were maintained on weekdays, the renovation was carried out intermittently in eight-metre sections. The tunnel is at a high point of the Taunus and marks the highest elevation of the line. The elevation drops towards Niedernhausen. Between 1996 and 1998, the halt (Haltepunkt) of Rhein-Main-Theater was located at line-kilometre 17.8 between Auringen-Medenbach and Niedernhausen (Taunus); this served the musical theatre of the same name, where Sunset Boulevard by Andrew Lloyd Webber was performed. Continuous theatre trains ran from Frankfurt Hauptbahnhof to the Niedernhausen Bahnhof, and then ran back to Rhein-Main-Theater.

In Niedernhausen, the Ländches Railway merges with the tracks of the Main-Lahn railway, allowing the trains to change between the routes without difficulty.

== Operations ==
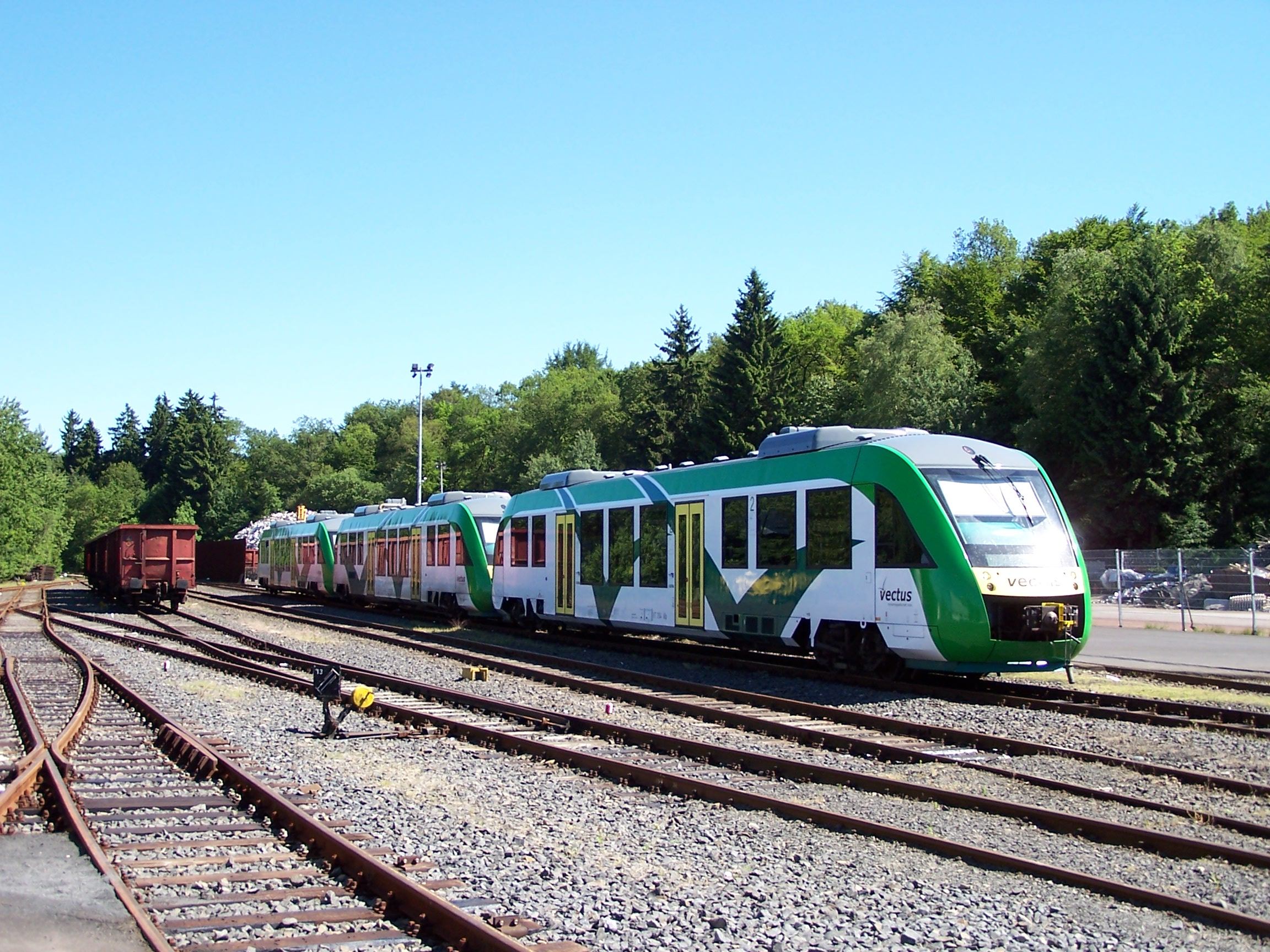
vectus Verkehrsgesellschaft mbH diesel multiple unit

The relatively short route is used primarily by commuter traffic and is therefore serviced by multiple units (i.e. self-propelled carriages). After World War II, these sets were mainly class ETA-176 battery-powered railcars based in Limburg. Trains generally stopped at every station along the line. Only expresses from Limburg to Wiesbaden ran non-stop between Niedernhausen and Wiesbaden. During low-traffic periods, operations with single railcars on the Ländches Railway were extended from Niedernhausen to Limburg. With the introduction of clock-face scheduling (trains scheduled at the same times every hour) on the Main-Lahn railway, the connecting traffic on the Ländches Railway was also systematised. In the 1970s, a pair of diesel multiple units ran from Au (Sieg) to Mainz on the Ländches Railway, connecting the Westerwald with the capital cities of Wiesbaden and Mainz.

From 2004 to December 2014, the traffic on the Ländches Railway was exclusively operated by Vectus Verkehrsgesellschaft of Limburg, using LINT railcars.

Since the founding of the Rhein-Main-Verkehrsverbund (RMV), the line has been integrated into the RMV uniform tariff.

The proposed Stadtbahn Wiesbaden project would have involved the introduction of a regional light rail network under the Karlsruhe model and would have included the Ländches Railway. These plans were well advanced, but were abandoned with a change of political majorities in the city in 2001.

At the beginning of November 2014, it was announced that the Rhein-Main-Verkehrsverbund and Alstom had agreed to use new railcars with fuel cell propulsion (iLINT) on the lines of the Taunus network (12, 13, 15 and 21) from 2018 at the earliest.

Since 14 December 2014, the line has been operated by the Hessische Landesbahn (HLB). It was initially operated for about a year with Stadler GTW sets and another LINT 41 set owned by HLB. These were replaced in December 2015 by six Siemens Desiro Classic sets belonging to the HLB, which had previously been used on the Kahlgrund Railway and were released because operations on that line were then taken over by Westfrankenbahn, part of DB Regio.

== Stations ==
All stations on the Ländches Railway are in the tariff area of the Rhein-Main-Verkehrsverbund (RMV). With the exception of Niedernhausen station (and the abandoned Rhein-Main-Theater station), these are also in the Wiesbaden urban area. Some have direct access to local bus routes, while the nearest bus stop to others is a short distance away and the stop is not named after the station. The rebuilding of the Wiesbaden stations, which as announced would have begun in the spring of 2013, has been delayed. In December 2014, it was announced that the renovation works would begin in the spring 2016 and be completed in the autumn of 2016.

=== Wiesbaden Hbf ===
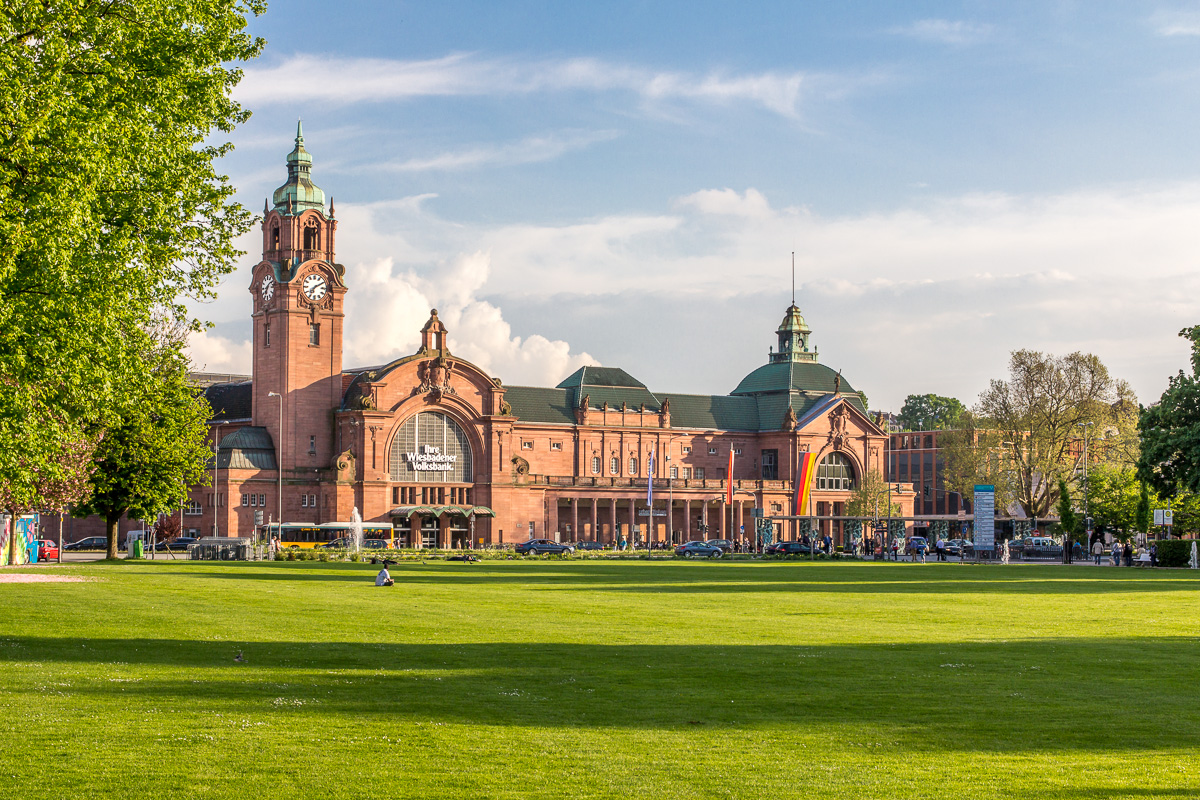
Entrance building of the Wiesbaden Hauptbahnhof

Until 1906, the Ländches Railway ended in Wiesbaden at the Ludwigsbahnhof (50°4′39″N 8°14′45″E). With the reconstruction of the railway tracks in the city, the new Hauptbahnhof (50°4′15″N 8°14′38″E) became the end of the line. This provides connections to long-distance traffic as well as to various regional rail services and bus routes.

=== Wiesbaden-Erbenheim ===
Wiesbaden-Erbenheim station (50°3′17″N 8°17′44″E) is located about 400 metres west of the town hall and the church square of the district of Erbenheim. Until 2005, there were two mechanical signal boxes in Erbenheim, which were demolished with the dismantling of infrastructure, including points, meaning that the station is now classified as a Haltepunkt (halt). The signal box at the exit to Wiesbaden Hauptbahnhof served as a guard signal box. The single-storey former station building formerly had a ticket office as well as a baggage handling office. As part of the renewal of the stations on the Ländches Railway, a shift of the station towards Berliner Straße is planned to shorten the paths from the bus stop and town centre to the station.

=== Wiesbaden-Igstadt ===
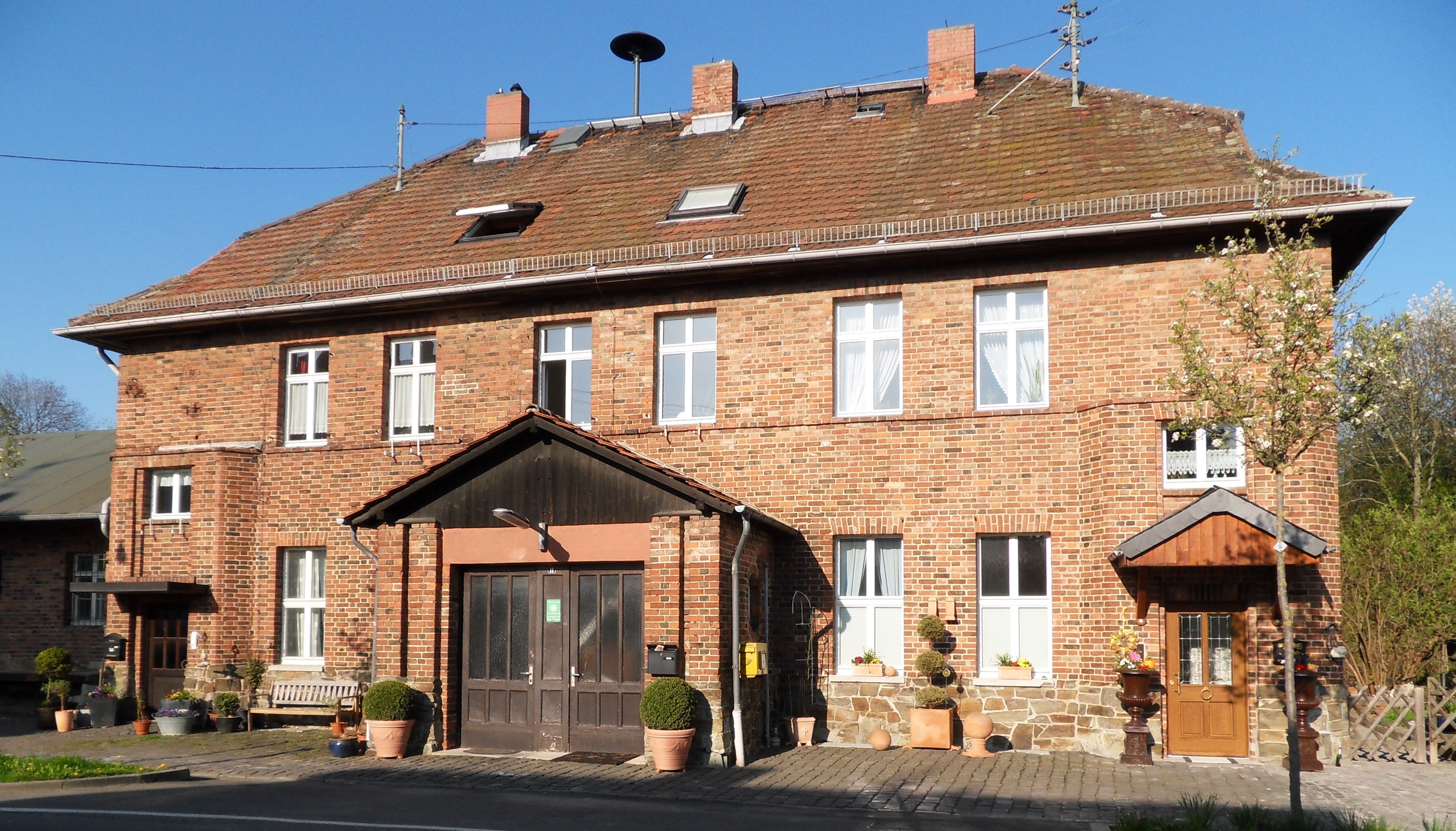
Entrance building of Wiesbaden-Igstadt station (2010)

Wiesbaden-Igstadt station (50°4′56″N 8°19′32″E) is located west of the district of Igstadt and has a heritage-listed entrance building from 1926. It is planned to build a new access from the centre of Igstadt to station. Igstadt station is the only station on the Ländches Railway with a crossing loop apart from the endpoints. In July 2017, the mechanical signal box was replaced by a computer-based interlocking.

=== Auringen-Medenbach ===
Auringen-Medenbach station (50°06′49″N 8°19′55″E) is located between the two Wiesbaden districts of Auringen and Medenbach. A stately entrance building with an extension, a freight shed, a laundry, a kerosene cellar and stables were built. On the ground floor there was a large waiting room with wooden benches and a potbelly stove, while the upper floors served as a dwelling for railway officials. Originally, the station had two platform tracks and a freight track and the points were controlled via a signal box. The building was demolished in 1972 due to its disrepair and replaced by a waiting shelter. Meanwhile, the track infrastructure was dismantled, converting the station into a halt. The ESWE buses serve the nearby August-Ruf-Straße stop. Plans are currently underway to modernise the halt and improve the connection between the railway station and the bus stop.

=== Niedernhausen ===
The line connects to the Main-Lahn Railway at Niedernhausen station (50°9′34.71″N 8°18′46.31″E). This is served by S-Bahn line S2 as well as the buses of Omnibusverkehr Rhein-Nahe (ORN) and ESWE Verkehrsgesellschaft.
