= William of Hesse =

William of Hesse may refer to:

- William I, Landgrave of Hesse (1466–1515), German nobility
- William II, Landgrave of Hesse (1469–1509), German nobility
- William IV, Landgrave of Hesse-Kassel (1532-1592), German nobility
- William I, Elector of Hesse (1743-1821), German nobility
- Prince William of Hesse, or Landgrave William of Hesse-Kassel (1787-1867), German nobility
