= War of the Katzenelnbogen Succession =

1500–1557 war of succession between nobles of the Holy Roman Empire

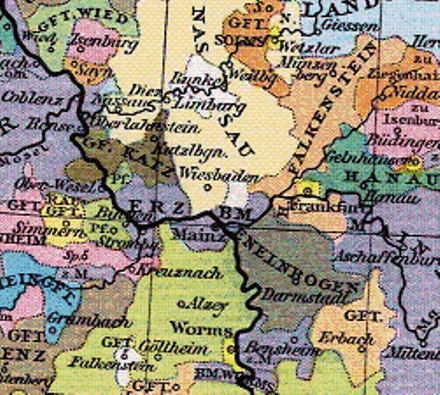
Katzenelnbogen and environs in 1400
County of Katzenelnbogen
County of Nassau
Landgraviate of Hesse
Date	17 February 1500 – 30 June 1557
Location	County of Katzenelnbogen
Result	Hessian victory Treaty of Frankfurt (1557)
Territorial changes	Hesse acquires Katzenelnbogen, Nassau acquires the Hessian quarter of Diez

Belligerents
Landgraviate of Hesse	Nassau-Dillenburg

Commanders and leaders
William II "the Middle" (1500–1509); Philip I (1509–1557)	John V (1500–1516); William I "the Rich" (1516–1557)

Within the Holy Roman Empire, the War of the Katzenelnbogen Succession (German: Katzenelnbogener Erbfolgekrieg; Dutch: Katzenelnbogische Successieoorlog) or the Katzenelnbogen Succession Struggle (German: Katzenelnbogener Erbfolgestreit, Katzenelnbogische Erbfolgestreit; Dutch: Katzenelnbogische Erfopvolgingsstrijd) (1500–1557) was a war of succession about the County of Katzenelnbogen after the death of William II "the Younger", Landgrave of Hesse. In the end, Philip I, Landgrave of Hesse won the conflict. William I "the Rich", Count of Nassau-Siegen, known for being the father of William the Silent and Johann VI, Count of Nassau-Dillenburg (progenitors of the current House of Orange-Nassau), lost the war and got himself into deep financial troubles.

== Background ==
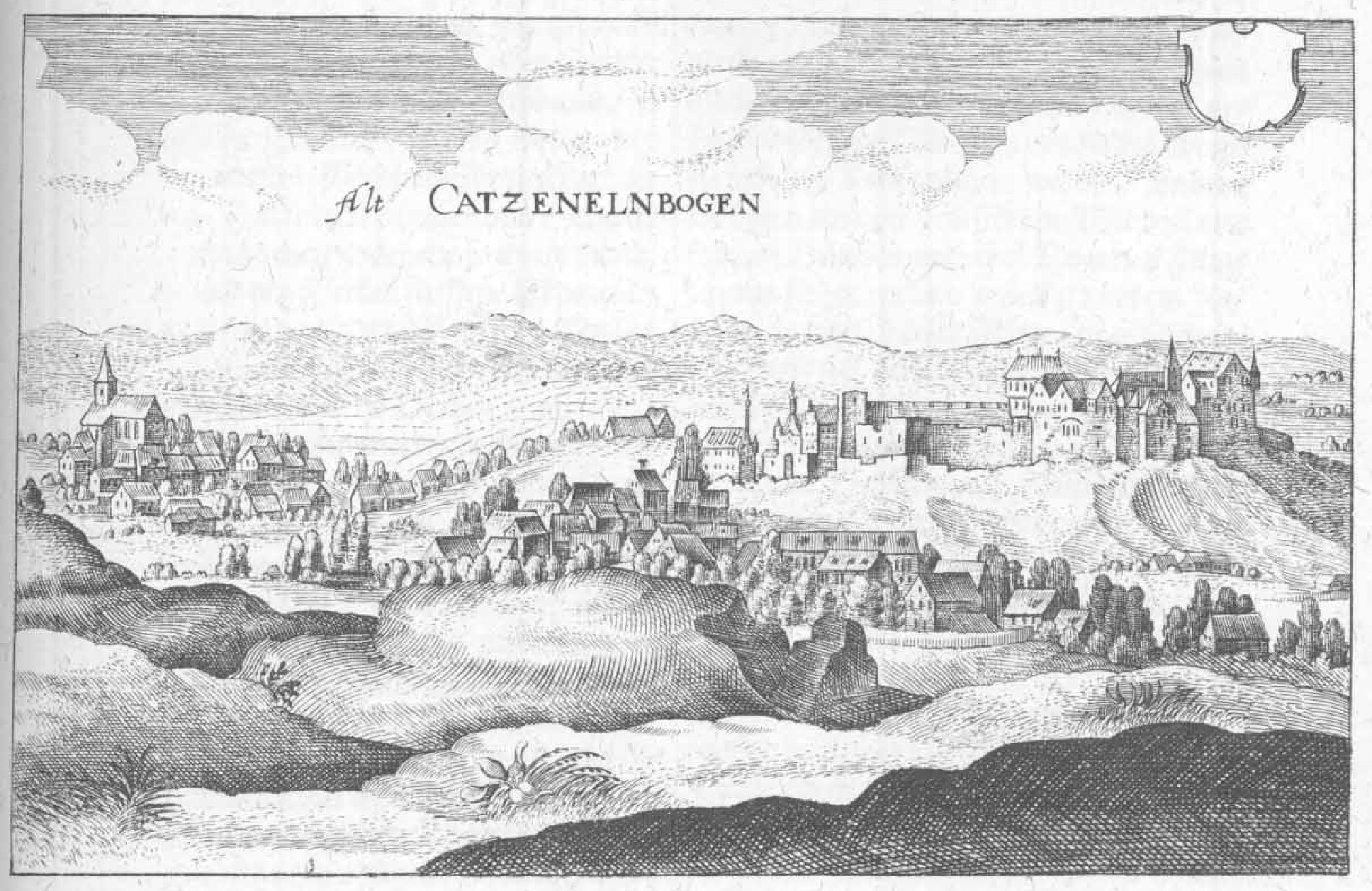
Katzenelnbogen in 1655

=== Genealogical overview ===
Philipp I of Katzenelnbogen	Anna of Württemberg	Louis I of Hesse	Anna of Saxony
Anna of Katzenelnbogen	Henry III of Upper Hesse	Louis II of Lower Hesse	Mechthild of Württemberg-Urach
John V of Nassau-Siegen	Elisabeth of Hesse-Marburg	William III of Upper Hesse "the Younger"	William II of Lower Hesse "the Middle"	Anna of Mecklenburg- Schwerin	William I of Lower Hesse "the Elder"
William I of Nassau-Dillenburg "the Rich"	Philip I of Hesse

Undisputed count(ess) of Katzenelnbogen
Undisputed count jure uxoris of Katzenelnbogen
Disputed count(ess) of Katzenelnbogen
Disputed count jure uxoris of Katzenelnbogen

=== Origins ===
The origins of the conflict lay in the engagement of John V, Count of Nassau-Siegen to Elisabeth of Hesse-Marburg in 1471. On this occasion, Philipp I, Count of Katzenelnbogen had stipulated that Katzenelnbogen would fall to the House of Nassau if the branch of Elisabeth's father Henry III, Landgrave of Upper Hesse would go extinct. At the eventual marriage treaty between John and Elisabeth in 1482, they had renounced Elisabeth's inheritance, with the exception of the maternal share. However, after Henry III died in 1483, his widow Anna modified the paternal inheritance of Katzenelnbogen in favour of her son William III "the Younger" of Upper Hesse, a provision that conflicted with the 1471 engagement treaty and the 1482 marriage treaty of her daughter Elisabeth with John. Moreover, William III also concluded an inheritance treaty on Katzenelnbogen with the Electors of Saxony and Brandenburg, under which he would compensate his sisters Elisabeth and Matilda of Hesse (married to John II, Duke of Cleves) with 50,000 florins. Matilda would eventually renounce her share of the inheritance, but John of Nassau-Siegen protested on behalf of his wife Elisabeth against this course of action in 1488.

=== Outbreak of war ===
When Elisabeth's brother William III "the Younger" of Upper Hesse died childless on 17 February 1500, the scenario outlined in the engagement treaty of 1471 emerged. Indeed, Elisabeth laid claim to all her brother's bequeathed lands, and John also immediately jure uxoris assumed the title count of Katzenelnbogen. But William II "the Middle" of Lower Hesse, the cousin of William III "the Younger" of Upper Hesse, also laid claim upon Katzenelnbogen. For both Hesse and Nassau, the county of Katzenelnbogen was a desirable inheritance, not only because of its wealth, but also because of its geographical location.

When negotiations began with William II "the Middle" of Lower Hesse, John initially let go of the title again. But on 24 May 1500, King of the Romans Maximilian I prohibited William "the Middle" from infringing upon the counties of Katzenelnbogen and Nassau. John also received several fiefs of Katzenelnbogen from the Duke of Jülich and the Abbey of Prüm. Tensions rose between Hesse and Nassau when William "the Middle" took possession of Katzenelnbogen, disregarding Elisabeth's rights. All attempts by John to acquire his rights remained fruitless, despite several amicable negotiations. Facing the powerful House of Hesse, he did not consider trying to enforce his claim by violence a viable option. John therefore filed a complaint with the Reichskammergericht. Issuing a verdict in 1507, that court awarded half the county to Elisabeth, but William "the Middle" rejected the judgement. It led to a half-century long, difficult and costly legal battle between Hesse and Nassau known in German as the Katzenelnbogische Erbfolgestreit ("Katzenelnbogen Succession Struggle").

== Course ==
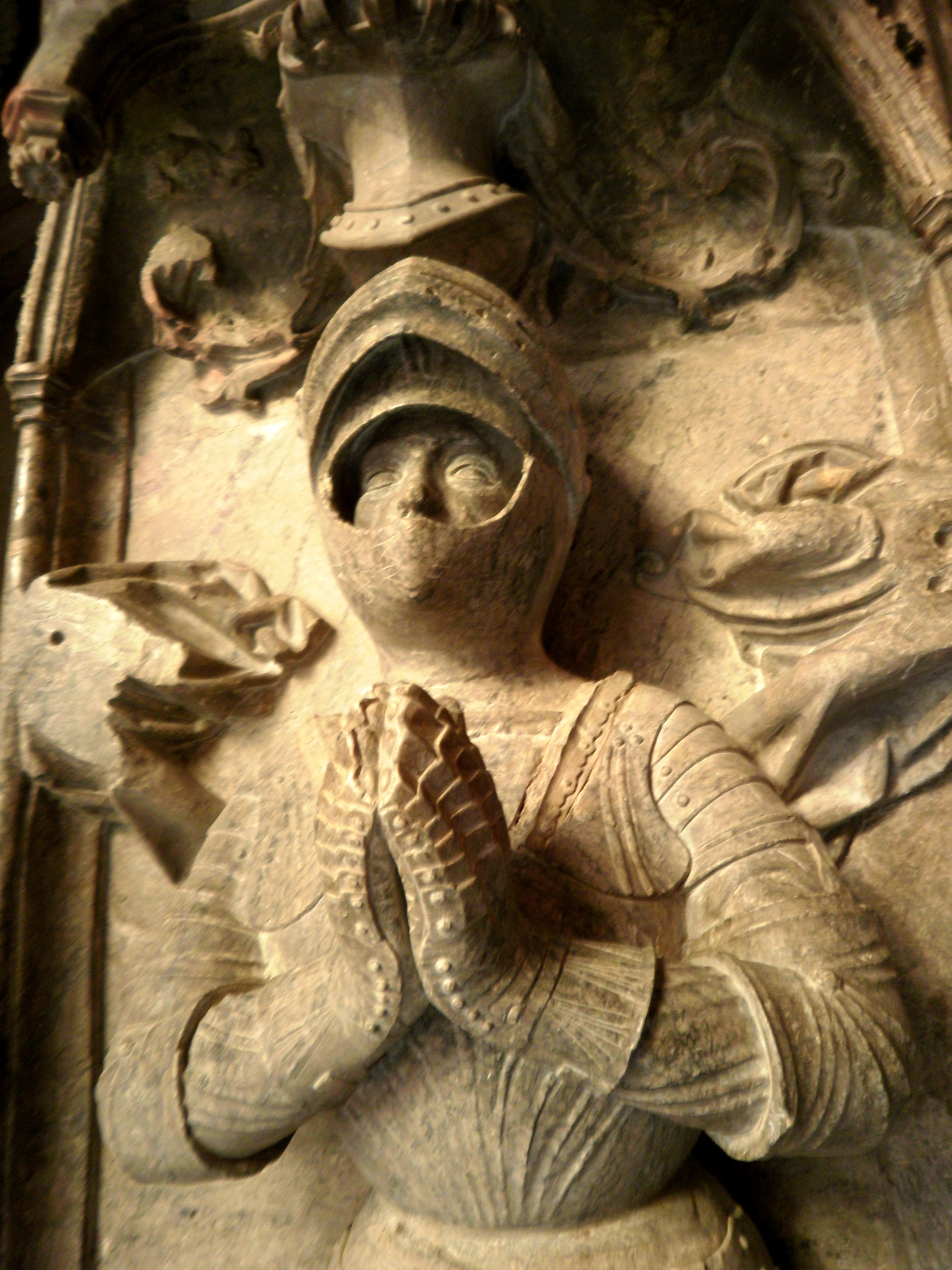
Tomb of William II "the Middle", Landgrave of Lower Hesse

In the opening phase, William II "the Middle" of Hesse (died in 1509) employed much military violence in order to enforce his claim on the County of Katzenelnbogen. With his troops he went up and down the Rhine, destroying fortresses, burning down villages, while in between he also engaged in noble hunting. He considered himself a legitimate successor to his cousin William III "the Younger" of Hesse, and acted based on the idea that a good ruler is a strict ruler who shows he is the strongest.

Even before the death of John V of Nassau-Siegen on 30 July 1516, his sons Henry III of Nassau-Breda and William I of Nassau-Dillenburg (also known as William " the Rich") had agreed in 1504 and 1509 that Henry (in succession to his uncle Engelbert of Nassau-Breda) would inherit the Ottonian-line possessions in the Low Countries, while William (in succession to their father John V van Nassau-Siegen) would get the possessions in present-day Germany. William continued the struggle against Hesse over Katzenelnbogen for several more decades.

In August 1521, when new negotiations with Philip I of Hesse (succeeded William "the Middle" in 1509) once again came to naught, William of Nassau bought Matilda's inheritance rights from the Duke of Cleves and made preparations for violently enforcing his claim to Katzenelnbogen. To this end, he made an alliance with the powerful warlord Franz von Sickingen, but the latter was soon more likely to need help himself during the Knights' War (1522–1523), in which Franz died in battle. Although Nassau had good ties with Emperor Charles V and thus managed to secure a favourable political judgment in 1524 (the Tübinger Urteil), William could do little with this in practice, because he had no means of enforcing his rights militarily. In 1525, Philip of Hesse converted to Lutheranism and embarked on an anti-Habsburg and reformed aggressive expansionist policy. William "the Rich" would also gradually convert himself and his County of Nassau-Siegen to Lutheranism between 1526 and 1537.

== Settlement ==
The more than 50-year struggle, which was mostly a legal battle, but sometimes also military one, repeatedly came close to a decision, but continued dragging on. A peace treaty was finally reached at Frankfurt on 30 June 1557 under the mediation of the Augustus, Elector of Saxony; Otto Henry, Elector Palatine; and the Dukes of Gülich and Württemberg.

William "the Rich" of Nassau-Siegen had to renounce his claims to Katzenelnbogen, which definitively fell to Hesse. In compensation, William received 600,000 florins for his claims to the inheritance, a quarter of which was to be paid by Hesse in land and the rest in money over a period of eight years. Nassau was given the Hessian quarter of the county of Diez, including the districts of Camberg, Weilnau, Wehrheim, Ellar, Driedorf, and half of Hadamar. Although William had received lavish compensation with this, the county of Nassau-Siegen had been weakened by the long battle and the loss of Katzenelnbogen. Years of mismanagement and the war had left Nassau-Siegen's administration and finances in shambles.

When the now not-so-rich William died two years later and was succeeded by his second son Johann VI, Count of Nassau-Dillenburg ("John of Nassau" or "John the Elder"), the latter had his hands full for years to come in putting the county's administration in order, and cleaning up its finances.

== See also ==
- War of the Thuringian Succession or Thuringian-Hessian Succession (1247–1264)
- Hessian Fratricidal War (1469–1470)
- Hessian War (1567–1648)

== Bibliography ==
- Joachim, Ernst (1881). "Johann V. von Nassau-Dillenburg". Allgemeine Deutsche Biographie. Band 14 (in German). Leipzig: Duncker & Humblot. pp. 252–254 [online version]. Archived from the original on 6 January 2023.
- Kluiver, J.H. (1984). Nederlandse historische bronnen 4 · dbnl (in Dutch). DBNL. Archived from the original on 15 August 2022.
- Kolb, Richard (1898). "Wilhelm (der Reiche), Graf von Nassau-Katzenellenbogen". Allgemeine Deutsche Biographie. Band 43 (in German). Leipzig: Duncker & Humblot. pp. 129–131 [online version].
- Lies, Jan Martin (2013). Zwischen Krieg und Frieden: Die politischen Beziehungen Landgraf Philipps des Großmütigen von Hessen zum Haus Habsburg (1534–1541). Göttingen: Vandenhoeck & Ruprecht. p. 596. ISBN 9783525101162. Archived from the original on 17 August 2022.
- Lück, Alfred (1981) [1967]. Siegerland und Nederland (in German) (2. Auflage ed.). Siegen: Siegerländer Heimatverein e.V.
- Meinardus, Otto (1899–1902). Der Katzenelnbogische Erbfolgestreit. (4 volumes). Wiesbaden: J.F. Bergmann.
- Müller, Gerhard (2020). Napoleonische Epoche – Obrigkeit (in German). Walter de Gruyter. p. 13. ISBN 9783110878332. Archived from the original on 15 August 2022.
- von Werner, Tanja (2014). Ehre und Gedechnis: Fama und Memoria der Landgrafen von Hessen (in German). Tectum Wissenschaftsverlag. p. 190. ISBN 9783828858992. Archived from the original on 15 August 2023.
