= Wiesbaden-Heßloch =

Borough and State Capital in Germany

Coordinates: 50°06′40″N 8°17′45″E

Hessloch is a borough of Wiesbaden, the capital of the state of Hessen, Germany. It is the smallest and least-populated of Wiesbaden's boroughs with 663 residents. The formerly independent village was incorporated into Wiesbaden on 1 April 1928.

The village is situated in the foothills of the Taunus and surrounded by orchards. It is near Federal Highway 455, about 5 km from Autobahn 3. Adjacent boroughs are Bierstadt, Rambach, Naurod, and Kloppenheim.
