= William III of Hesse =

- Born: 8 September 1471
- Died: 17 February 1500 (aged 28)
- Spouse: Elisabeth of the Palatinate
- House: House of Hesse
- Father: Henry III of Upper Hesse
- Mother: Anna of Katzenelnbogen

William III "the Younger", Landgrave of Hesse (8 September 1471 – 17 February 1500) ruled on the part of the county known as Upper Hesse, with residence in Marburg.

William was the son of Landgrave Henry III from the House of Hesse and his wife Anna of Katzenelnbogen. When his father died in 1483, William was still a minor, and therefore had his uncle Archbishop Herman IV of Cologne, and Hans Hofman of Dörnberg acted as guardian until 1489.

With the rich revenues of the country could William could purchase in 1492 half the barony of Eppstein (including the so-called Ländchen ('little country')) and in 1493 part of Klingenberg am Main.

In 1498 he married Elisabeth, the daughter of Elector Palatine Philip.

William died young after he fell from a horse while hunting, and left no legitimate offspring. His holdings fell to his cousin William II, so that all of the Landgraviate of Hesse was again united in one hand, plus the County of Katzenelnbogen. However, this last inheritance was disputed by his sister Elisabeth of Hesse-Marburg, triggering the War of the Katzenelnbogen Succession.

William III of Hesse House of Hesse Born: 8 September 1471 Died: 17 February 1500
Regnal titles
Preceded by Henry III	Landgrave of Hesse; 1483-1500	Succeeded by William II
