= Wiesbaden-Erbenheim station =

Railway station in Wiesbaden, Germany

Wiesbaden Erbenheim
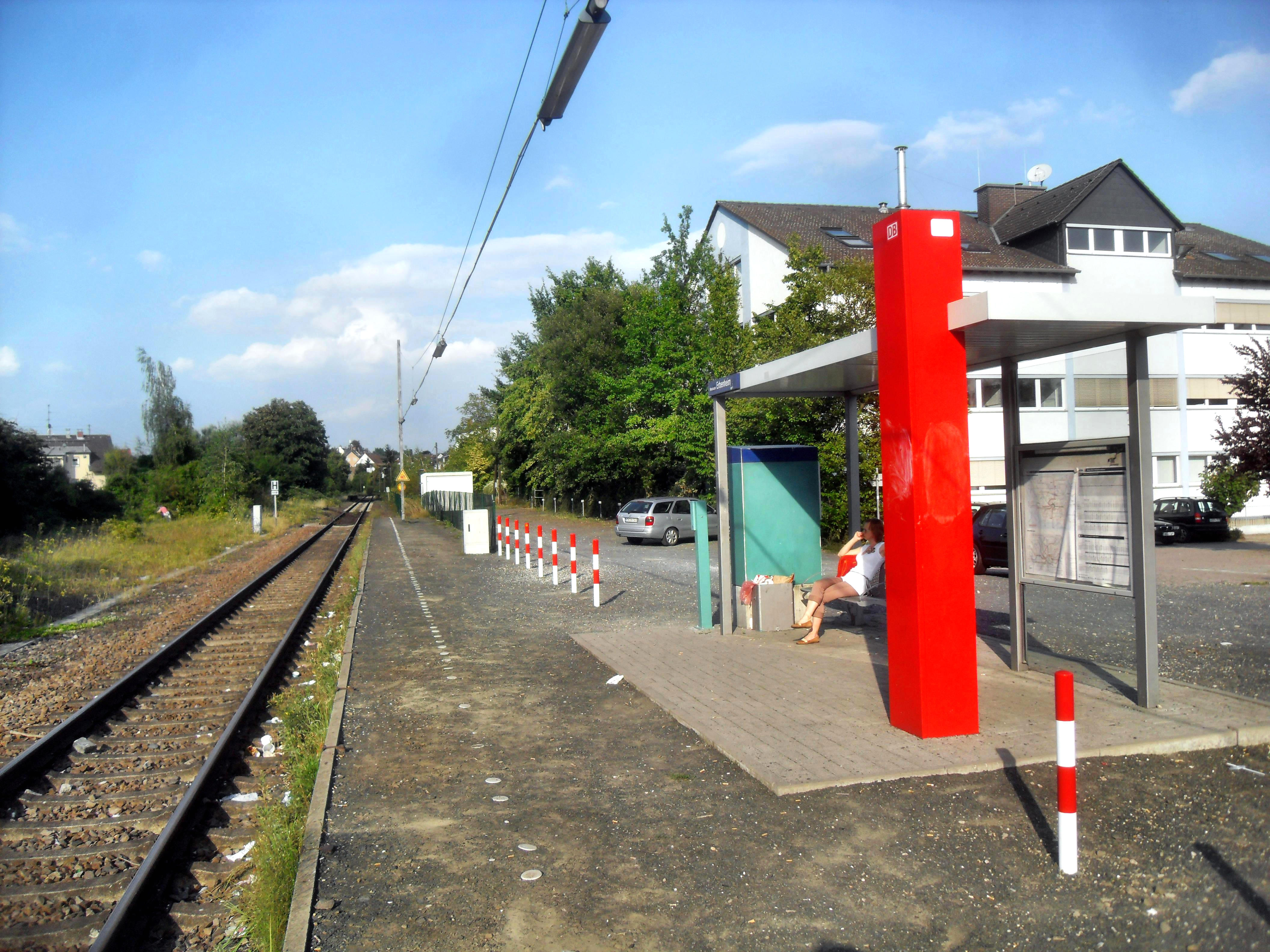

General information
- Location: Wiesbaden, Hesse; Germany
- Coordinates: 50°03′17″N 8°17′44″E
- Owner: DB Netz
- Operator: DB Station&Service
- Line: Ländchesbahn (4.9 km)
- Platforms: 1 side platform
- Tracks: 1
- Train operators: Hessische Landesbahn

Other information
- Station code: 6747
- DS100 code: FWE
- IBNR: 8006407
- Category: 6
- Fare zone: : 6501; RNN: 300 (RMV transitional tariff)
- Website: www.bahnhof.de

History
- Opened: 1879

Services
Preceding station	Hessische Landesbahn	Following station
Wiesbaden-Igstadt towards Limburg (Lahn)	RB 21	Wiesbaden Hbf Terminus
Location
- Location within Hesse

Wiesbaden-Erbenheim station is a railway station in the borough of Erbenheim in the Hessian state capital of Wiesbaden on the Ländchesbahn from Wiesbaden to Niedernhausen. It is classified by Deutsche Bahn as a category 6 station. The station was opened in 1879.

== Services ==
Erbenheim lies in the area served by the Rhein-Main-Verkehrsverbund (Rhine-Main Transport Association, RMV). It is used by Regionalbahn trains operated by DB Regio.

=== Trains ===
Regionalbahn services operate at hourly intervals on the Wiesbaden–Niedernhausen route. In the rush hour, the service extends to a half-hourly interval and a few trains run to Limburg.

=== Buses ===
The station is also served by bus lines 5, 15, 28, 62 and 67, which stop at the Egerstraße bus stop 300 metres away.
