= Wiesbaden-Kloppenheim =

Kloppenheim
- Borough of Wiesbaden
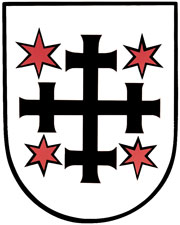
- Coat of arms

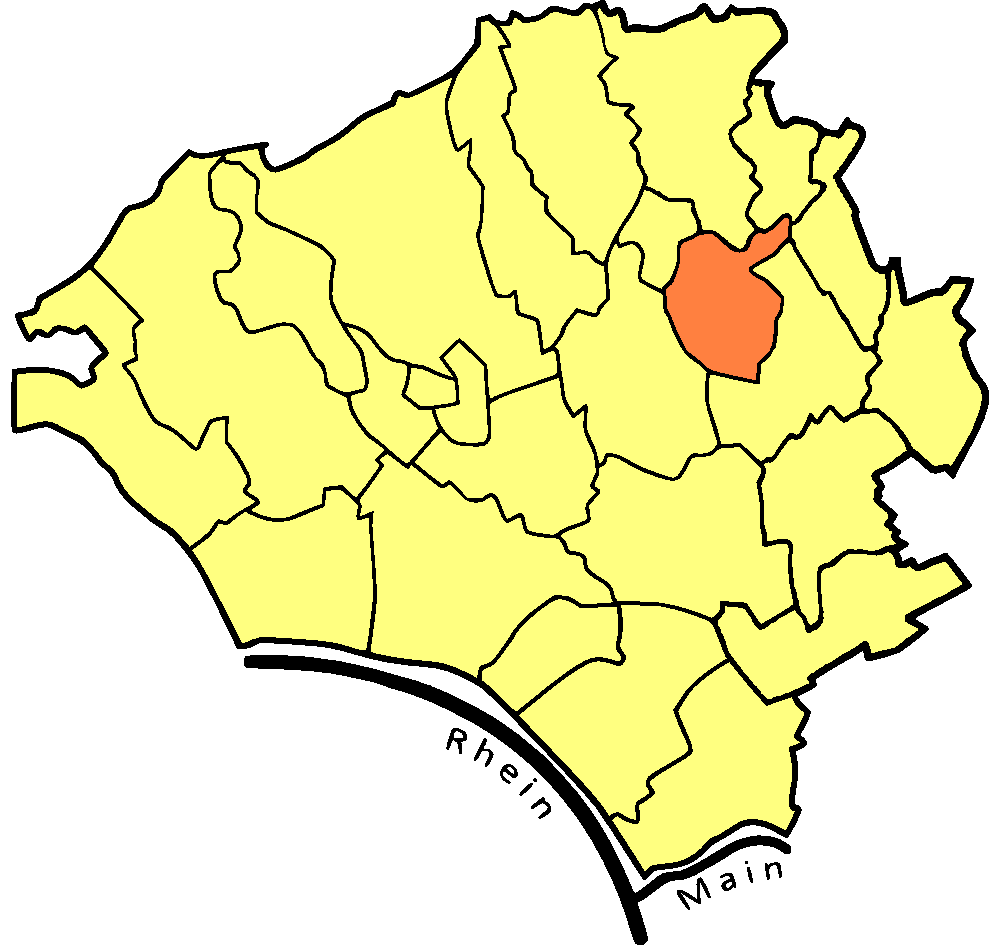
- Location of Kloppenheim in Wiesbaden
- Interactive map of Kloppenheim
- Location within Germany Location within Hesse
- Coordinates: 50°05′40″N 8°18′20″E
- Country: Germany
- State: Hesse
- District: Urban district
- City: Wiesbaden

Government
  - Mayor: Erika Milke-Frenz (SPD)

Area
  - Total: 5.39 km^{2} (2.08 sq mi)

Population (2020-12-31)
  - Total: 2,294
  - Density: 426/km^{2} (1,100/sq mi)
- Time zone: UTC+01:00 (CET)
  - Summer (DST): UTC+02:00 (CEST)
- Postal codes: 65207
- Dialling codes: 0611
- Vehicle registration: WI
- Website: http://www.wiesbaden.de/kloppenheim

Kloppenheim is a borough of Wiesbaden, capital of the federal state of Hesse, Germany. Kloppenheim was incorporated into Wiesbaden in 1928. The adjacent boroughs are (clockwise, starting in the north) Naurod, Auringen, Medenbach, Igstadt, Bierstadt, and Heßloch.

== History ==
Frankish graves in the area of present-day Bierhausweg indicate that a settlement existed in Kloppenheim as early as the 6th and 7th centuries. Kloppenheim is first mentioned by name in a deed of gift in 927 AD during the reign of Saxon King Henry I. In a further certificate, Count Drutwin bequeaths six marks to the Bleidenstadt monastery in "Clopheim" and a forest with adjacent fields. The name "Clopheim" meant "residence on the rock of the hill", and probably dates to Frankish time.

In the history of the following centuries, Kloppenheim played no special role. It was part of the Königssondergau of Charlemagne and later was among the dominions of the House of Nassau. Like the surrounding areas, Kloppenheim experienced the hardships of armed conflict over the centuries, particularly during the Thirty Years War and the French Revolutionary Wars in 1797.

The religious life of Kloppenheim was long closely associated with the monastery in Bleidenstadt (now Taunusstein), founded by Charlemagne. The present church dates largely from the years 1706 to 1708.

In 1927, Kloppenheim, with 970 inhabitants, celebrated its 1000-year anniversary, which attracted thousands of visitors. One year later it was incorporated into Wiesbaden.

During World War II, on 22 March 1945, six days before the invasion of Wiesbaden by American forces, three Russian prisoners of war - Kostiantin Sachum (17), Ivan Nikitin (18) and Nikolin Savtzuk (21) - were shot to death in Kloppenheim. In 2002, it was discovered that this was done in order to cover up that one of the prisoners had been mistreated. Today a commemorative plaque stands in the Kloppenheim cemetery for the three Russian soldiers.

== Politics ==
The distribution of seats in the borough assembly (Ortsbeirat) of Kloppenheim is as follows:

	CDU	SPD	Environmental; Group	FDP	Total
2006	2	3	2	0	7
2001	3	3	1	0	7
1997	2	3	2	0	7
1993	2	4	1	0	7
1989	2	4	1	0	7
1985	3	4	0	0	7
1981	2	4	0	1	7
1977	3	4	0	0	7
1972	3	4	0	0	7

== Demographics ==
As of 31 December 2020, Kloppenheim has 2,294 inhabitants, of whom 1,169 (51.0%) are women. The percentage of foreigners is 9.5%.

== Sources ==
Derived from German Wikipedia
