= Salzbach (Wiesbaden) =

River in Germany

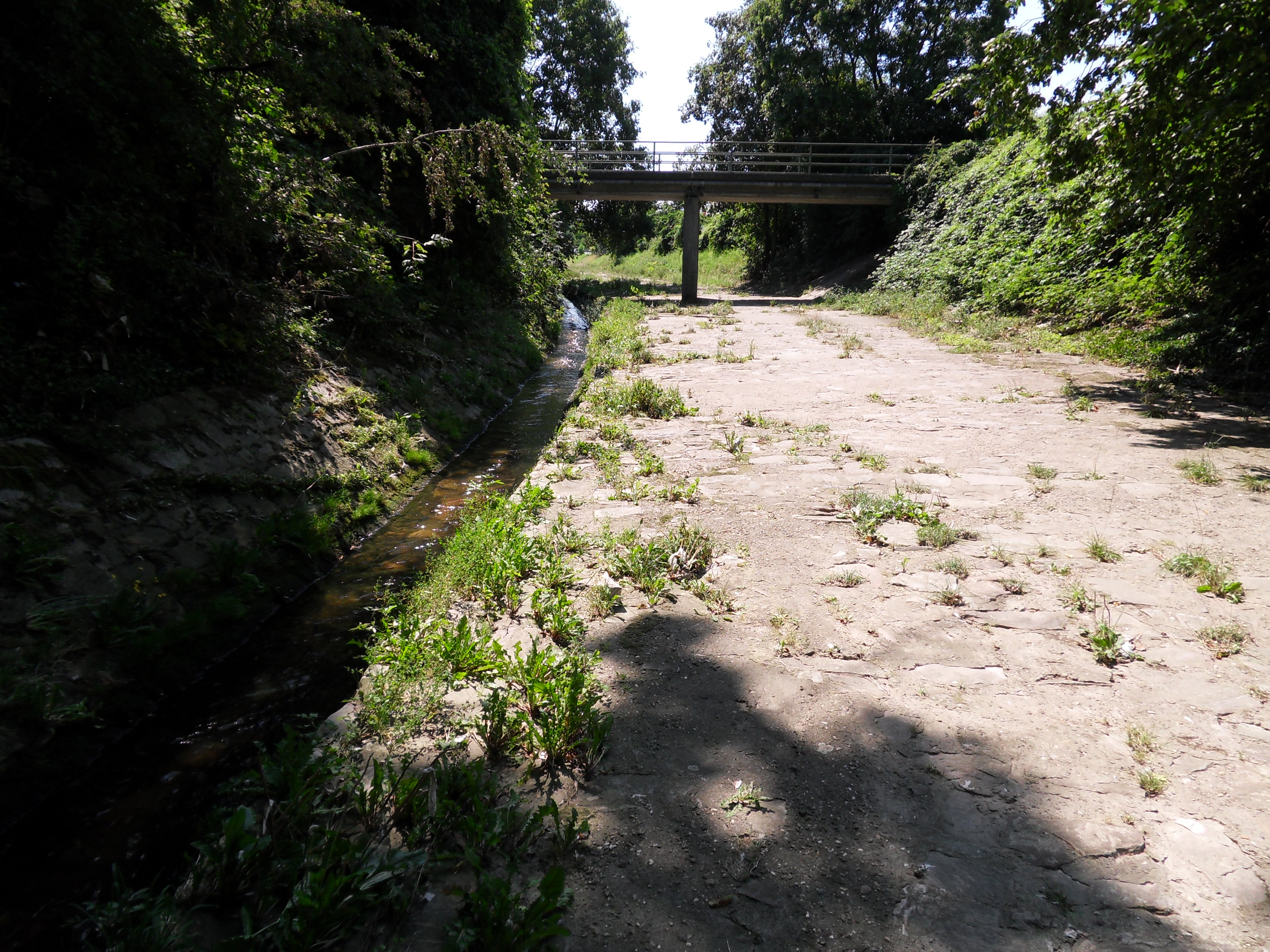

Location
- Country: Germany
- State: Hesse

Physical characteristics
- Mouth
  - location: Rhine
  - coordinates: 50.0317°N 8.2483°E
- Length: 15.1 km (9.4 mi)

Basin features
- Progression: Rhine→ North Sea

Salzbach (in its upper course: Rambach) is a stream in the city of Wiesbaden, in the state of Hesse, Germany. It is a tributary of the Rhine.

== See also ==
- List of rivers of Hesse
