= William II, Landgrave of Hesse =

William II
- Landgrave of Upper Hesse; Landgrave of Lower Hesse
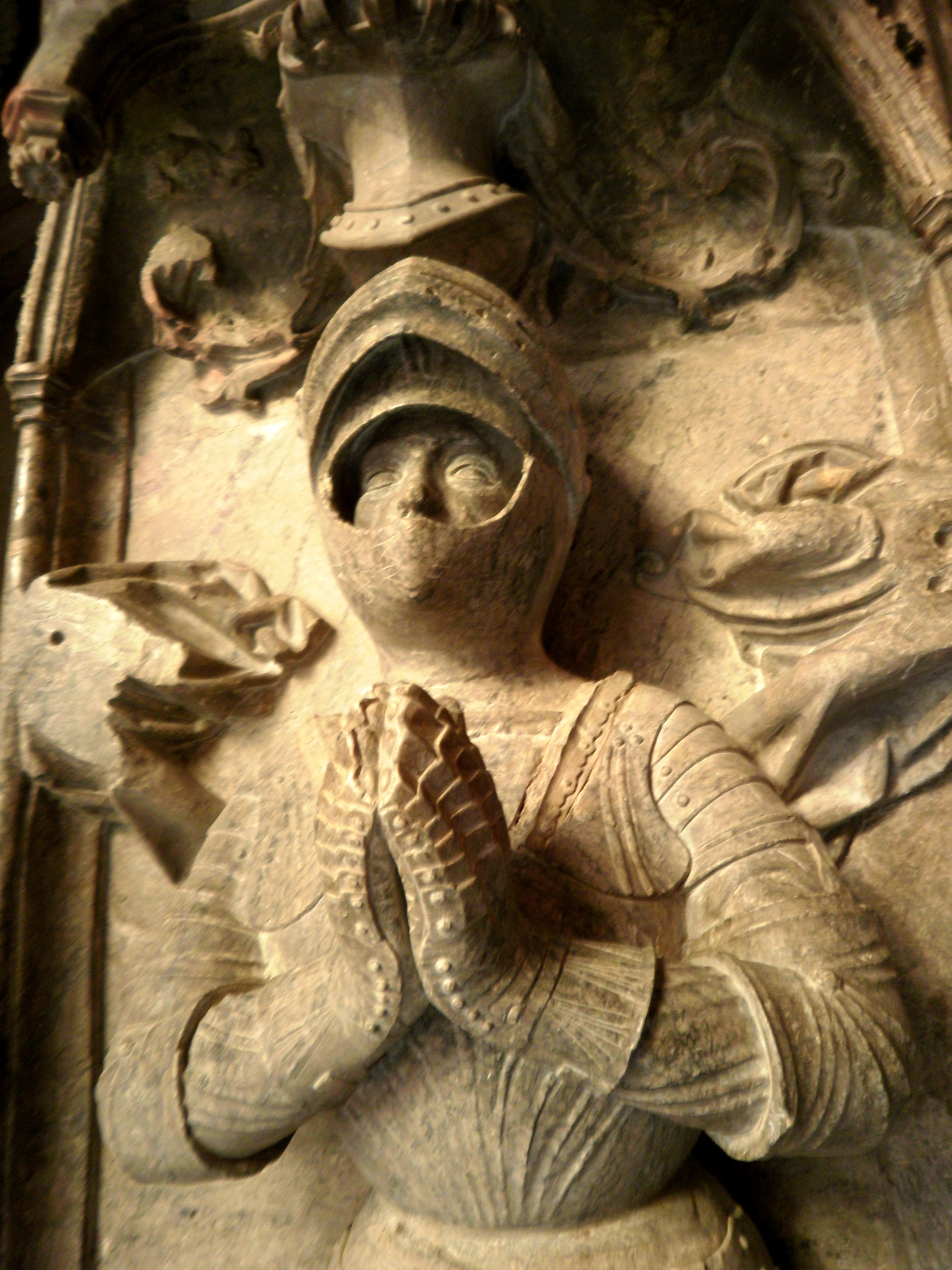
- Tomb effigy of William II
- Born: 29 April 1469
- Died: 11 July 1509 (aged 40)
- Spouse: Yolande of Vaudémont; Anna of Mecklenburg-Schwerin
- Issue: William; Elisabeth, Hereditary Princess of Saxony; Magdalena; Philip I, Landgrave of Hesse
- House: House of Hesse
- Father: Louis II, Landgrave of Lower Hesse
- Mother: Mechthild of Württemberg-Urach

William II (29 April 1469 – 11 July 1509) was Landgrave of Lower Hesse from 1493 and Landgrave of Upper Hesse after the death of his cousin, William III, Landgrave of Upper Hesse in 1500. This immediately sparked the War of the Katzenelnbogen Succession, in which William sought to enforce his claim on the County of Katzenelnbogen with military might.

William II is also called "William the Middle" to distinguish him from his elder brother "William I the Elder", and his cousin "William III, the Younger". His parents were Louis II the Frank (1438–1471) and Mechthild, daughter of Count Louis II of Württemberg.

William II became Landgrave of Lower Hesse in 1493, after his brother William I resigned.

On 9 November 1497 William II married Yolande, daughter of Frederick II of Vaudémont. She died on 21 May 1500 after the marriage produced one child, William (27 March 1500 – 8 April 1500). The same year on 20 October, his second marriage was to Anna of Mecklenburg-Schwerin (14 September 1485 – 12 May 1525). They had:

- Elisabeth (4 March 1502 – 6 December 1557)
- Magdalena (18 July 1503 – September 1504)
- Philip I (13 November 1504 – 31 March 1567)

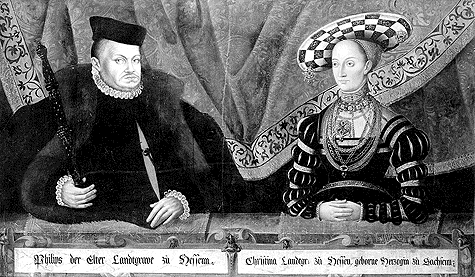
Philip of Hesse and Christine of Saxony, by Jost v. Hoff

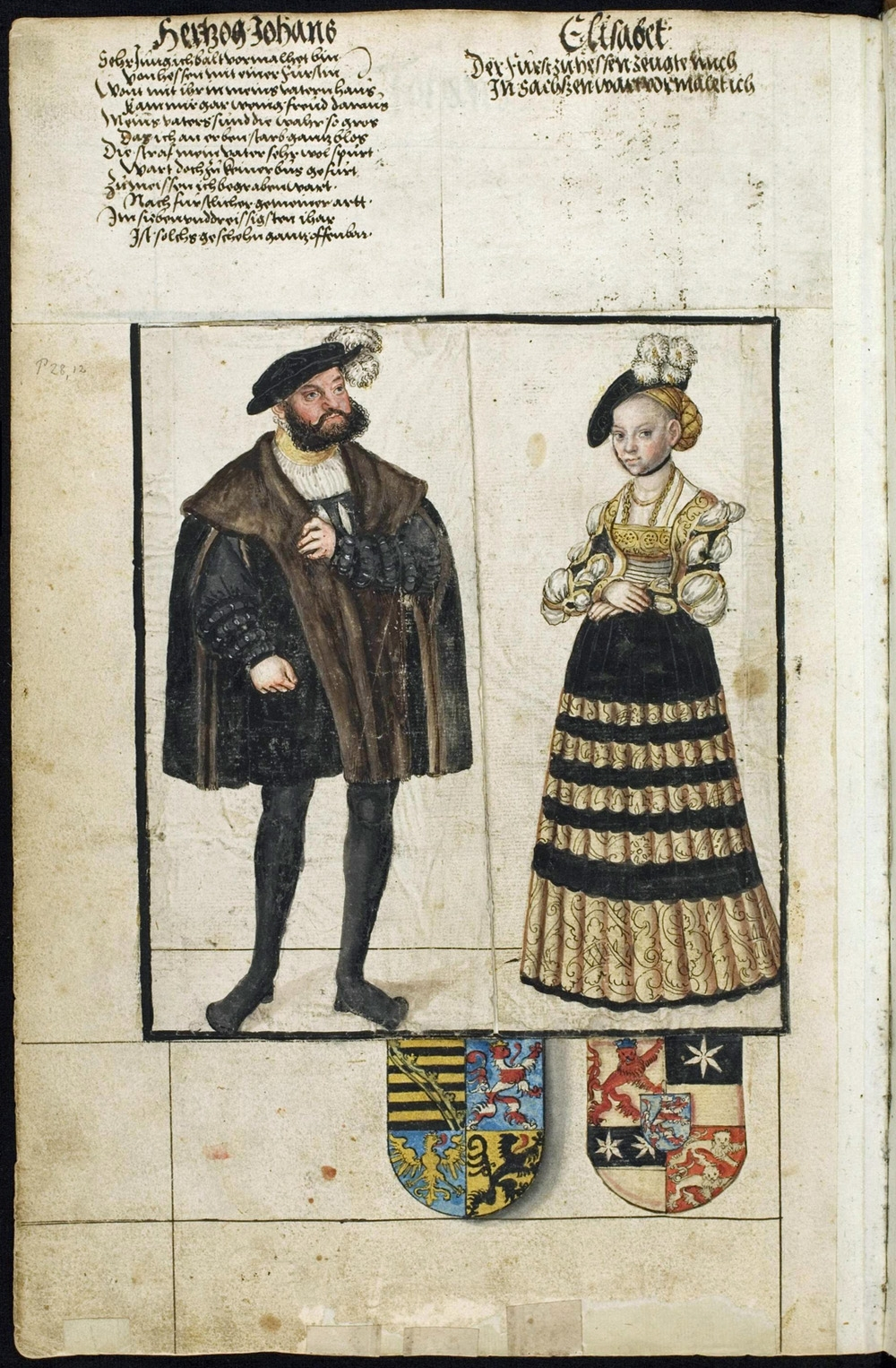
Elisabeth of Hesse with John of Saxony

In 1500, William II reunited the Landgraviate of Hesse after the death of his cousin William III. In 1503, Emperor Maximilian I commissioned William with executing the ban on Elector Philip of the Palatinate.

== Sources ==
- Pastrnak, Patrik (2023). Dynasty in Motion: Wedding Journeys in Late Medieval and Early Modern Europe. Routledge. ISBN 9781000917079.
- Rankin, Alisha (2013). Panaceia's Daughters: Noblewomen as Healers in Early Modern Germany. University of Chicago Press. ISBN 9780226925387.

Regnal titles
Preceded by William I	Landgrave of Lower Hesse; 1493–1509	Succeeded by Philip I
Preceded by William III	Landgrave of Upper Hesse; 1500–1509	Succeeded by Philip I
