= Wiesbaden-Erbenheim =

Erbenheim
- Borough of Wiesbaden
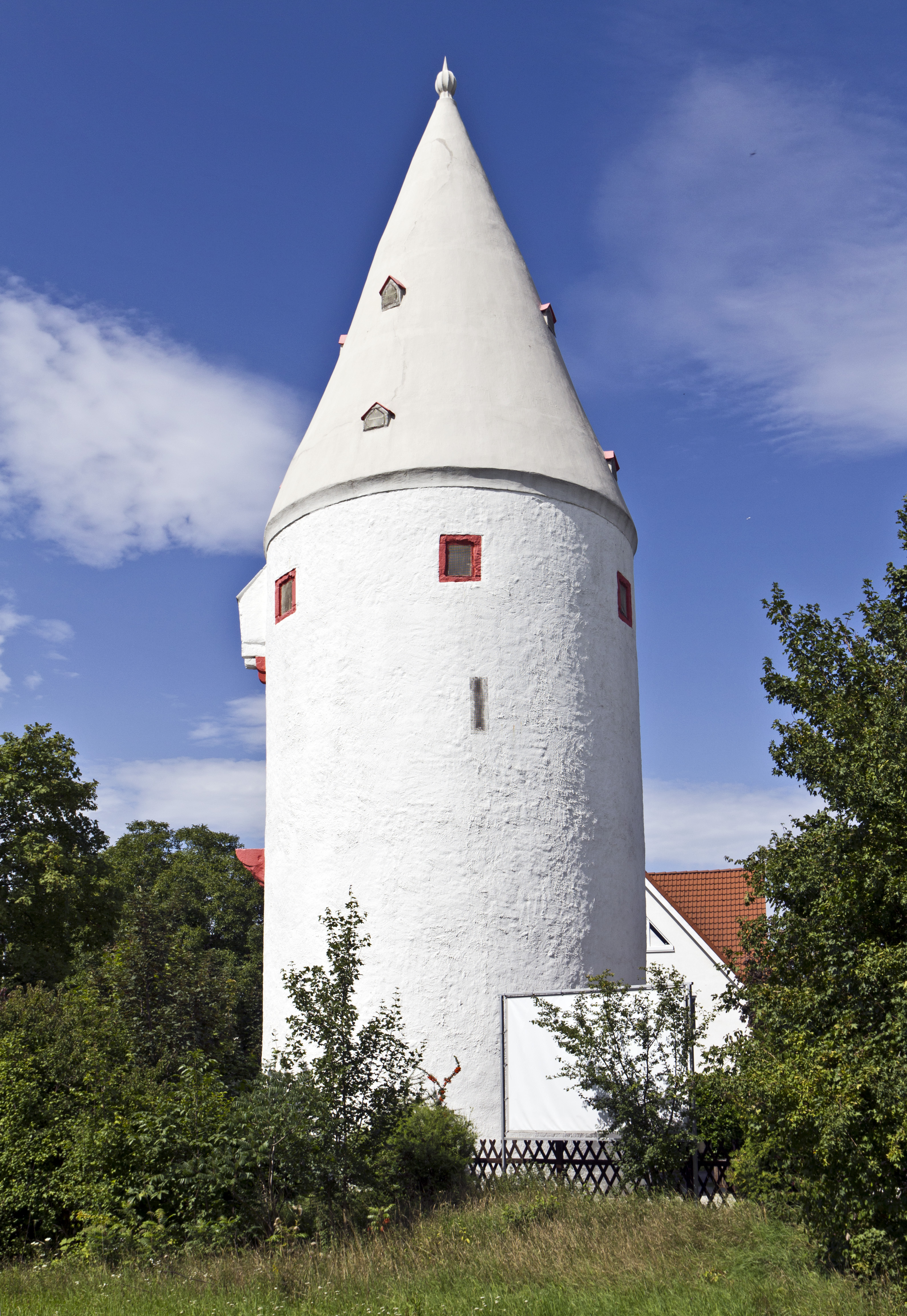
- Watchtower built in 1497

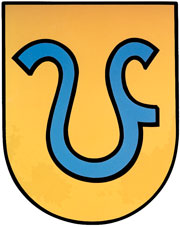
- Coat of arms
- Interactive map of Erbenheim
- Location within Germany Location within Hesse
- Coordinates: 50°03′N 8°18′E
- Country: Germany
- State: Hesse
- District: Urban district
- City: Wiesbaden
- First mentioned: 927 (1099 years ago)

Area
  - Total: 11.27 km^{2} (4.35 sq mi)
- Elevation: 110–188 m (361–617 ft)

Population (2020-12-31)
  - Total: 9,996
  - Density: 887.0/km^{2} (2,297/sq mi)
- Time zone: UTC+01:00 (CET)
  - Summer (DST): UTC+02:00 (CEST)
- Postal codes: 65205
- Dialling codes: 0611
- Vehicle registration: WI

Erbenheim is a borough of Wiesbaden, capital of the federal state of Hesse, Germany. It has about 10,000 inhabitants. Formerly an independent municipality, the settlement was incorporated into Wiesbaden on April 10, 1928. Militärflugplatz-Erbenheim (Lucius D. Clay Kaserne) is home to U.S. Army Europe and Africa.

== History ==
Erbenheim stands on a historic ground. Especially the archaeological excavations have shown how densely populated the area around the stream Wäschbach was already early in its history respectively 5,000 years before Christ. From the 2nd to the 4th century after Christ, the Romans finally settled down in the area of Erbenheim. Many Roman finds and Roman estates along the Wäschbach suggest that the Romans lived there until the late 4th century after Christ.

927 Erbenheim is first mentioned in the document for St. Ursula in Cologne, which is also meaningful for some suburbs of Wiesbaden. In 1423, Emperor Sigismund granted the town charter. Erbenheimer Warte, part of a series of watchtowers built by the prince-elector of Mainz in the late 15th Century, is a prominent cultural landmark. After the Thirty Years' War Erbenheim developed itself to an important agricultural community, in which wine-growing and sheep farming is very common. In the Medieval times the strong Saint Paul Lutheran Church was built in the old town of Erbenheim. From 1834 to 1835, today's townhall of Erbenheim was initially built as a school. First in 1926 the building became the town hall. The actual school, which is nowadays still in use and called Justus-von-Liebig-Schule, was built in 1900.

The electric tram was introduced first in 1906 and available between the city center of Wiesbaden and Erbenheim. At the same time the electric light was enabled in Erbenheim, which could be turned on for the first time in October 1908. In 1937 the tram service was folded. Busses provided the passenger transport from now on. The large taverns in Erbenheim were not only for the inhabitants, but also for the citizens of the surrounding towns always great attractions - not least because the visitors of the famous horse racings in Erbenheim, which was carried out between 1907 and 1910, liked to have stopped off for a pint in one of the many taverns in Erbenheim. The race track of Erbenheim was opened in 1910 and turned into a civilian airport in 1929.

1928 follows the incorporation of the city of Wiesbaden. Besides the above-mentioned Justus-von-Liebig-Schule, which is an elementary school, the district Erbenheim has also another school, which is called Hermann-Ehlers-Schule and sees itself as an integrated comprehensive school since 1992.

== Geography ==
Adjoining districts are Biebrich, Bierstadt, Igstadt, Mainz-Kastel, Nordenstadt und Südost. Lucius D. Clay Kaserne is located near the districts Delkenheim and Nordenstadt. In the Middle Ages Erbenheim was an autonomous city. The Erbenheimer Warte, which is located near Mainz-Kastel, was a medieval watchtower built for the Electorate of Mainz. The former race track of Wiesbaden is barely to perceive, you just can imagine it based on the remaining street Rennbahnstraße. Close to the townhall a public scale is situated, which is still in use.

== Economy ==
Erbenheim is the starting point of a road network for bikers. Additionally, all the country lanes are almost car-free. A trip on these country lanes is worth seeing. A certain route passes Domäne Mechthildshausen and the military airport up to the Nassau meadow with scattered fruit trees. Starting from this point a road network for bikers is extended towards Hochheim, Kostheim and Kloppenheim. These facilities are regularly used by cyclists, inline-skaters and walkers. In the village itself several catering businesses are established, covering a wide range of products in very different price segments. In the village there are several small shops, several butchers and bakeries, but also big supermarkets and bottle shops. The commercial area Kreuzberger Ring provides a direct freeway connection. Here are many service providers located, so that Erbenheim also offers a lot of attractive jobs.

== Infrastructure ==
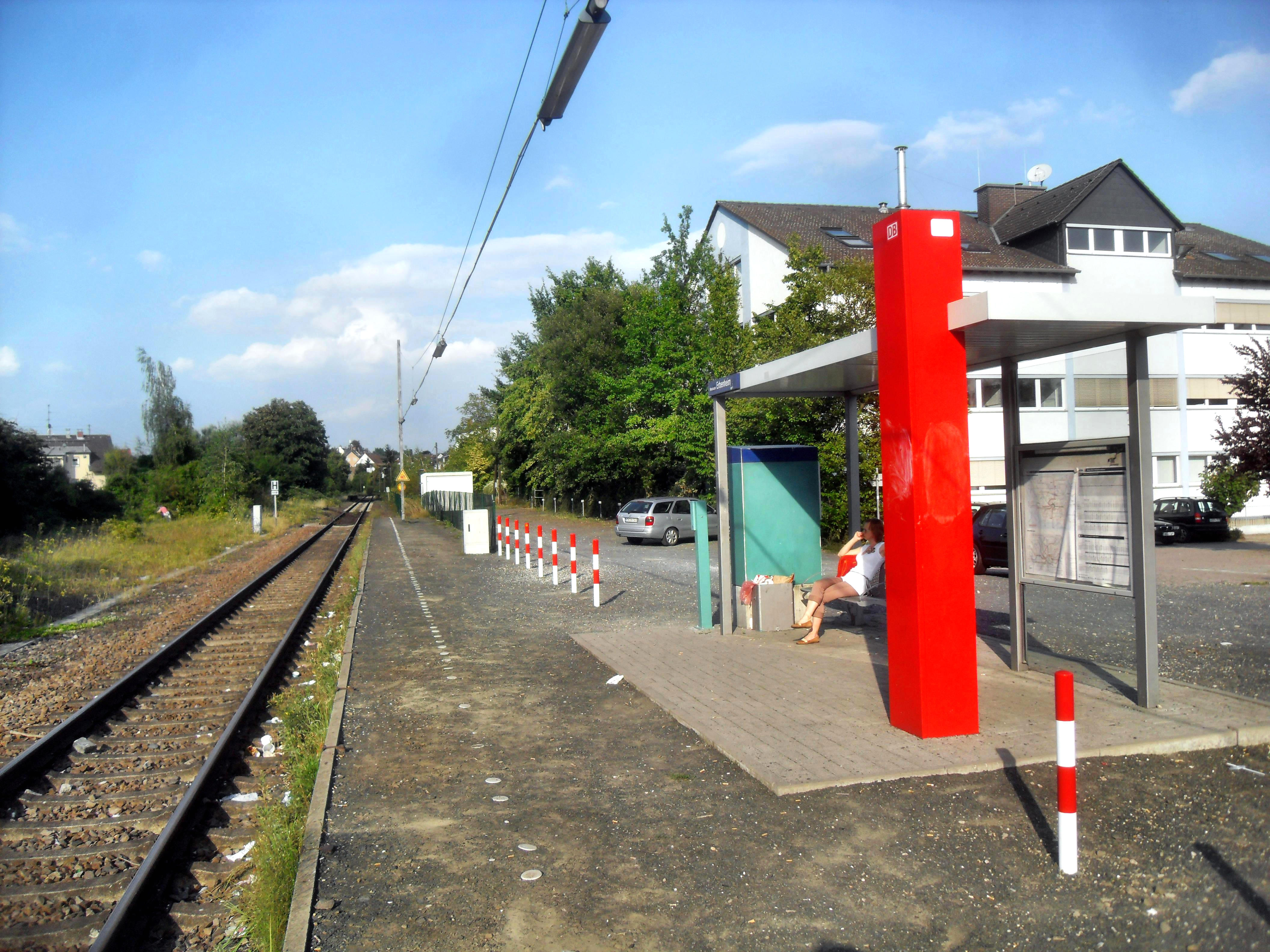
Erbenheim Station

The Erbenheim train station is located 400 meter West of the town hall and connects the district with the central station in Wiesbaden. Also Niedernhausen in the Taunus is available by this rail connection. As part of the renovation of the railway stations a relocation of the station towards the Berliner Strasse took place in order to shorten the distances from the bus stations to the town center. Furthermore, Wiesbaden-Erbenheim has a great connection to the road network. Thus, the federal highway 455 leads through the west of the district. Erbenheim has also convenient access to the Rhine-Main-expressway, a section of the national highway A66, that runs along south-east of Erbenheim and connects it with Wiesbaden and Frankfurt am Main.

== Social services ==
Since 1986, in Erbenheim exists an institution, called pluspunkt, which offers in Wiesbaden and the surrounding area a wide range of services for people, who have to deal with the aging process. This work is supported by the Protestant Paul's Community Erbenheim and the Protestant Dean of Wiesbaden. There is no denominational boundary or an age limit, everybody is welcome and can introduce his own ideas and desires and get involved.

Erbenheim has had a huge daycare center for children since 1997. It provides care of 116 children at the age of 0.5 years until 12 years. The daycare center offers four different groups for the different age classes. The methodology of the work in this institutions is based on the pedagogy of Maria Montessori in order to rear the children independent.

== Sources ==
- Adapted from the German Wikipedia article.
