= Igstadt =

- Borough of Wiesbaden
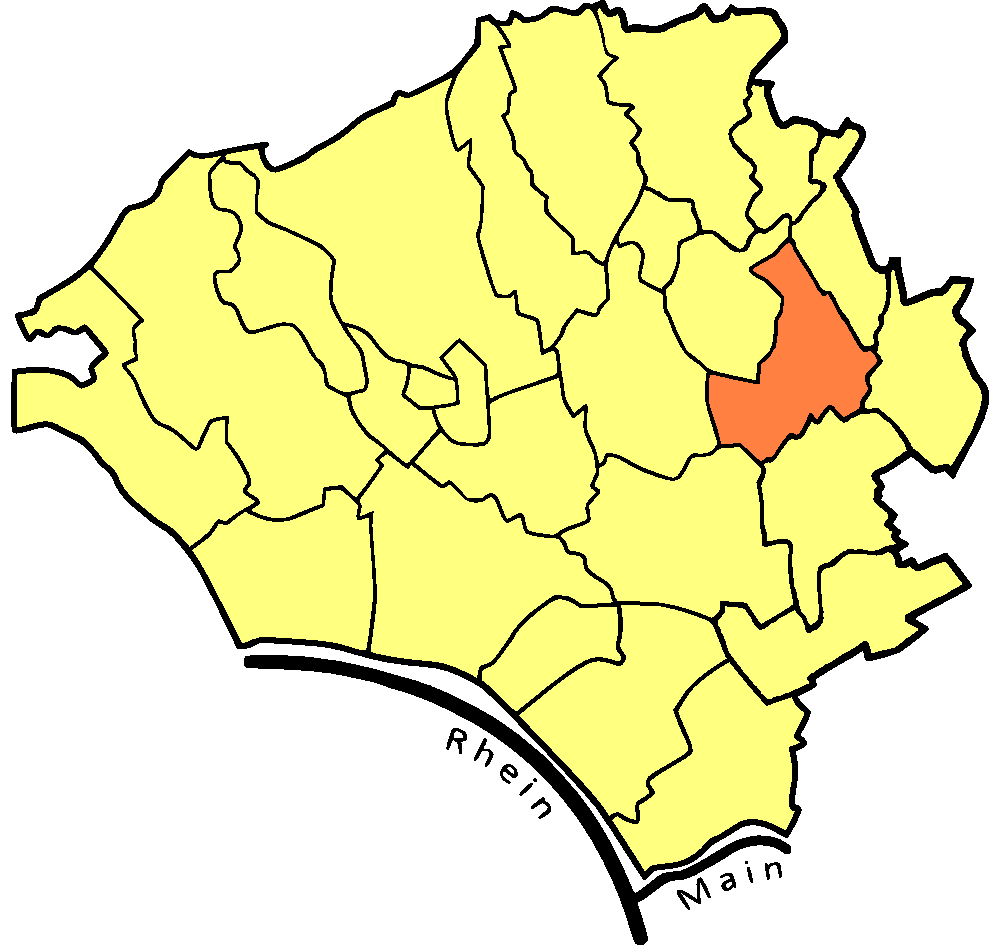
- Location of Igstadt in Wiesbaden
- Interactive map of Igstadt
- Location within Germany Location within Hesse
- Coordinates: 50°04′50″N 8°19′45″E
- Country: Germany
- State: Hesse
- District: Urban district
- City: Wiesbaden

Government
  - Mayor: Georg Steitz (SPD)

Area
  - Total: 7.26 km^{2} (2.80 sq mi)

Population (2020-12-31)
  - Total: 2,239
  - Density: 308/km^{2} (799/sq mi)
- Time zone: UTC+01:00 (CET)
  - Summer (DST): UTC+02:00 (CEST)
- Postal codes: 65207
- Dialling codes: 0611
- Vehicle registration: WI

Igstadt is an eastern borough of Wiesbaden, capital of the state of Hesse, Germany. It was incorporated into Wiesbaden on April 1, 1928 and currently has about 2,200 residents.

Igstadt is situated on the eastern slope of the Wäschbachtal valley at an elevation of 169 to 211 m above sea level. It is traversed by the Wiesbaden-Niedernhausen rail line. It is surrounded by agricultural land. Recreational areas include the Wickerbachtal Nature Reserve between Igstadt and Kloppenheim.
