= Wiesbaden-Nordenstadt =

Coordinates: 50°04′N 8°21′E

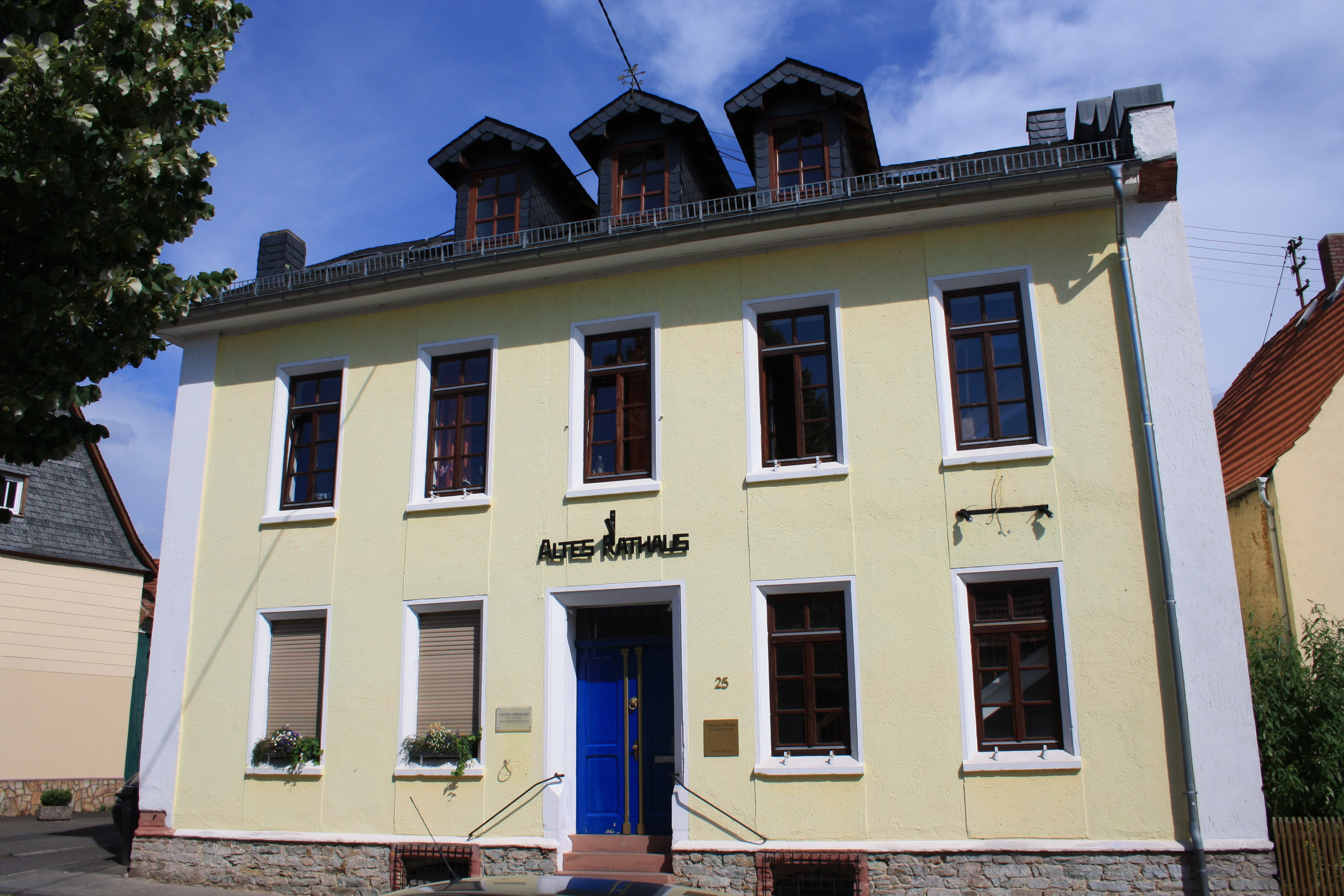
Wiesbaden-Nordenstadt

Nordenstadt (German pronunciation: [ˈnɔʁdn̩ʃtat]) is one of Wiesbaden's eastern suburbs, and was incorporated into the city of Wiesbaden on 1 January 1977. Its population is 7,829 (2020). It hosted the first corporate headquarters of Daewoo Germany in the early 1990s.
