= S1 (Rhine-Main S-Bahn) =

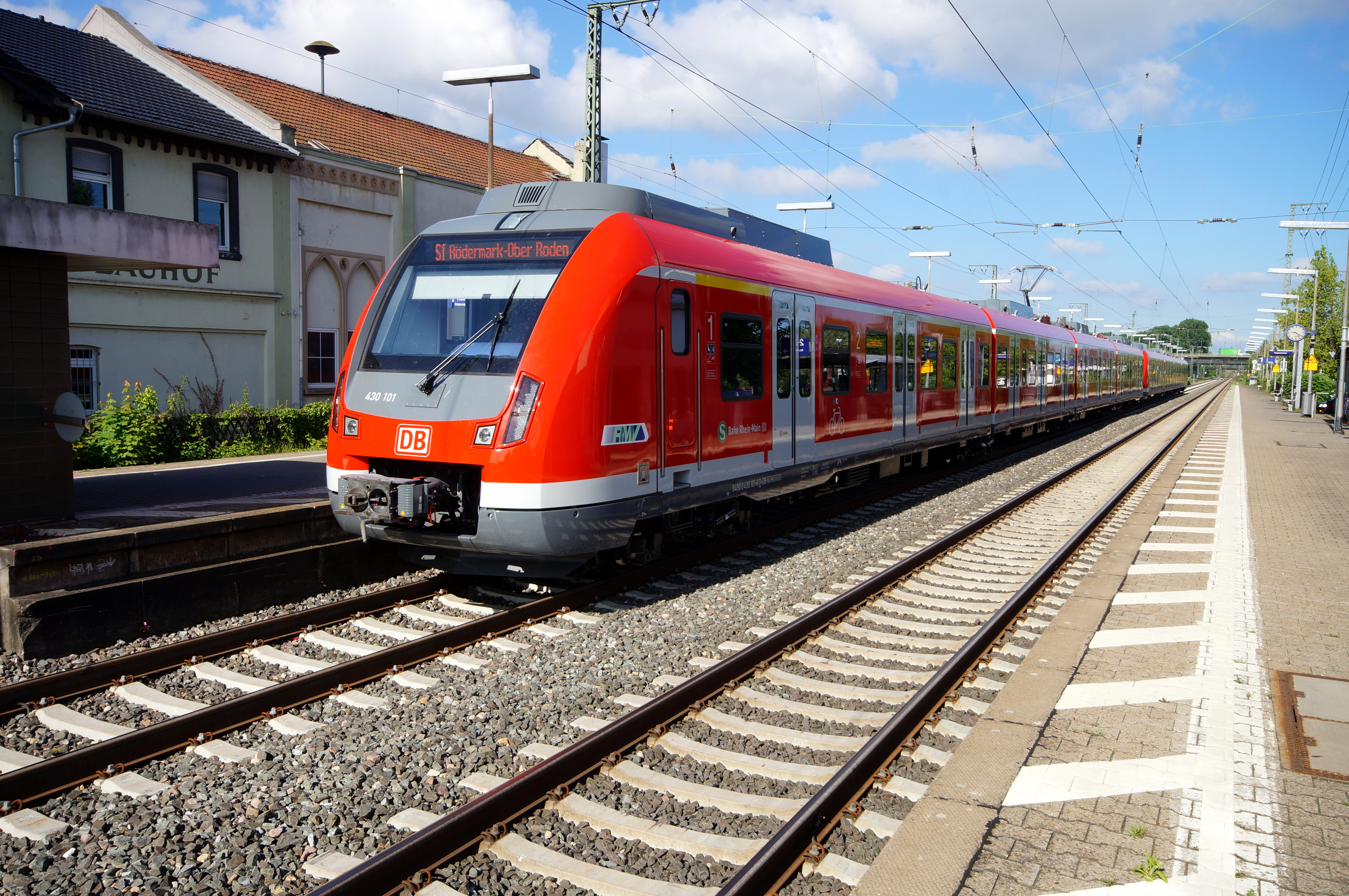
- S1 in Hochheim, bound for Wiesbaden

Overview
- Status: Operational
- Owner: DB Netz
- Locale: Frankfurt Rhine-Main
- Termini: Wiesbaden Hauptbahnhof; Rödermark-Ober Roden
- Stations: 32

Service
- Type: S-Bahn Rhein-Main (Rapid transit, Commuter rail)
- Services: Taunus Railway; Main-Lahn Railway; Citytunnel Frankfurt; Frankfurt Schlachthof–Hanau railway; Rodgau Railway
- Route number: 645.1
- Operator(s): DB Regio
- Rolling stock: DBAG Class 430

History
- Opened: 28 May 1978

Technical
- Line length: 72.1 km (44.8 mi)
- Track gauge: 1,435 mm (4 ft 8 1/2 in) standard gauge
- Electrification: Overhead line

The S1 service of the S-Bahn Rhein-Main system bearing the KBS (German scheduled railway route) number 645.1 is an important railway connection running east–west. It operates between the Hesse state capital Wiesbaden and the southern Offenbach rural district serving the densely populated area along the Main river.

With a route length of over 70 km (43 mi), 30 stations and a journey time of 87 minutes, it is the longest S-Bahn service in the Rhine-Main area. The average speed of travel is about 49.72 km/h (30.9 mph) and a station distance of about 2 km (1.2 mi).

Usually DBAG Class 423 railcars are used on this service. Its predecessor class 420 is only used for shortened shuttle services.

== Routes ==
=== Taunus railway ===
The western branch of the service starts at the central station of Wiesbaden and utilises the oldest railway route of the Rhine-Main area running between Mainz-Kastel and Frankfurt-Höchst parallel to the Main and the Taunus mountains from which the railway line derived its name. The about 31 km (19 mi) long route crosses the southern part of Wiesbaden, the Main-Taunus-Kreis and the westernmost part of Frankfurt. The service uses the existing double track route together with national, regional, and freight transportation. It serves eight stations. The Taunus Railway was opened in stages between 26 September 1839 and 19 May 1840 and has been used by S-Bahn services since 1978.

=== Main-Lahn railway ===
Between Farbwerke and Frankfurt-Griesheim this service shares the Main-Lahn line with freight and shunting operations. National and regional services use the parallel running Taunus railway in this section. The Main-Lahn railway was completed on 15 October 1877 and has been used by S-Bahn services since 1978.

=== City tunnel ===
The city tunnel is an underground, pure S-Bahn route used by almost all services (except for the S7 service which terminates at the central station). The tunnel was opened in four stages in 1978, 1983, 1990 and 1992. In a short section between Mühlberg and Offenbach-Kaiserlei the Frankfurt Schlachthof–Hanau railway is used. The section from Mühlberg to Offenbach Ost through the Offenbach City Tunnel was opened in 1995.

=== Rodgau railway ===
This line was opened in 1896 and has been used since 2003 only by S-Bahn services.

== History ==
Year	Stations	Route
1974 (R1)	12	Wiesbaden – Frankfurt Hbf
1978	14 (+2)	Wiesbaden – Hauptwache
1983	15 (+1)	Wiesbaden – Konstablerwache
1990	18 (+3)	Wiesbaden – Frankfurt Süd
1992	17 (+1, -2)	Wiesbaden – Mühlberg
1995	21 (+4)	Wiesbaden – Offenbach Ost
2003	31 (+10)	Wiesbaden – Rödermark-Ober-Roden

The S1 was one of the first six services of the Rhine-Main S-Bahn system. In a prior test operation it ran between Wiesbaden Central Station and Frankfurt Central Station. The service was then called R1 where the letter "R" stands for regional. After the opening of the Frankfurt Citytunnel the service was renamed to S1 and extended to the new Hauptwache underground station. Further extensions of the tunnel followed in 1983 (Konstablerwache) and 1990 (Ostendstraße and Lokalbahnhof) so that the Südbahnhof (South station) became the service's eastern terminal. In 1992 the eastern branch of the Citytunnel to the Mühlberg station was opened and the S1 started operation in this section shutting down its service to Lokalbahnhof and Südbahnhof. With the opening of the Offenbach Citytunnel, the service was extended eastwards to the station Offenbach Ost (Offenbach East).

In 2003 the Rodgau railway was included. After two years of construction work this route was changed to S-Bahn operation. Since then the new eastern terminal station is Rödermark-Ober-Roden.

== Operation ==
1. Wiesbaden – Rödermark-Ober-Roden
2. Hochheim – Rödermark-Ober-Roden
3. Hochheim – Offenbach-Ost
4. Hattersheim – Frankfurt Hbf (Shuttle service)
5. Frankfurt-Höchst – Rödermark-Oberroden
6. Frankfurt-Höchst – Offenbach-Ost
7. Frankfurt-Höchst – Frankfurt Hbf (Shuttle service)

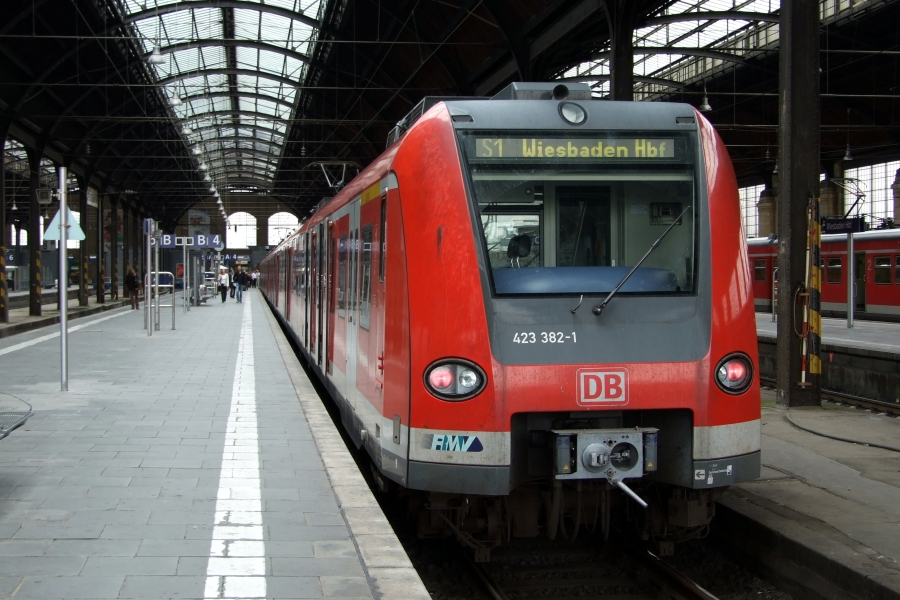
S1 at Wiesbaden Central Station

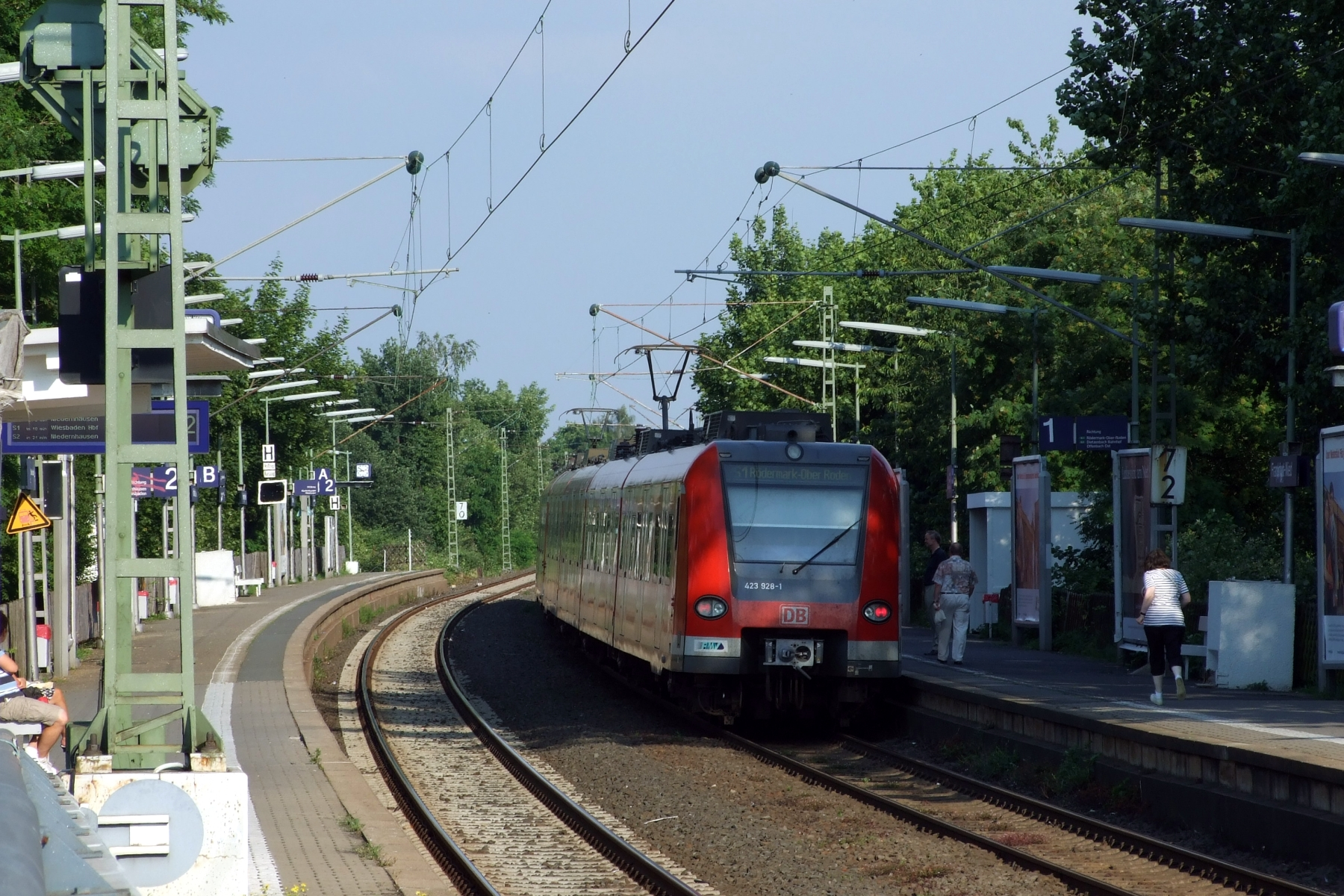
S1 at Frankfurt-Nied station

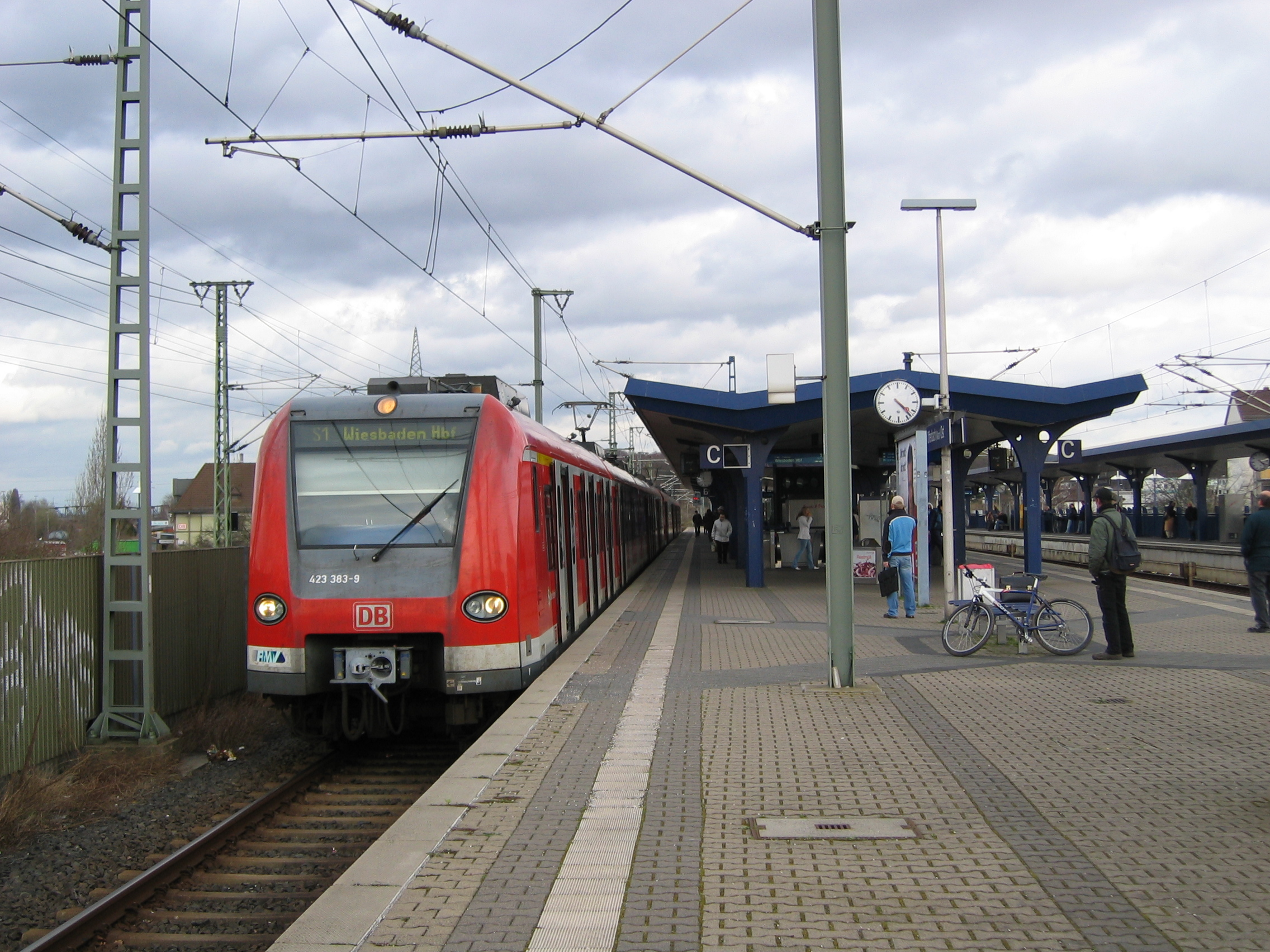
S1 at Offenbach East Station

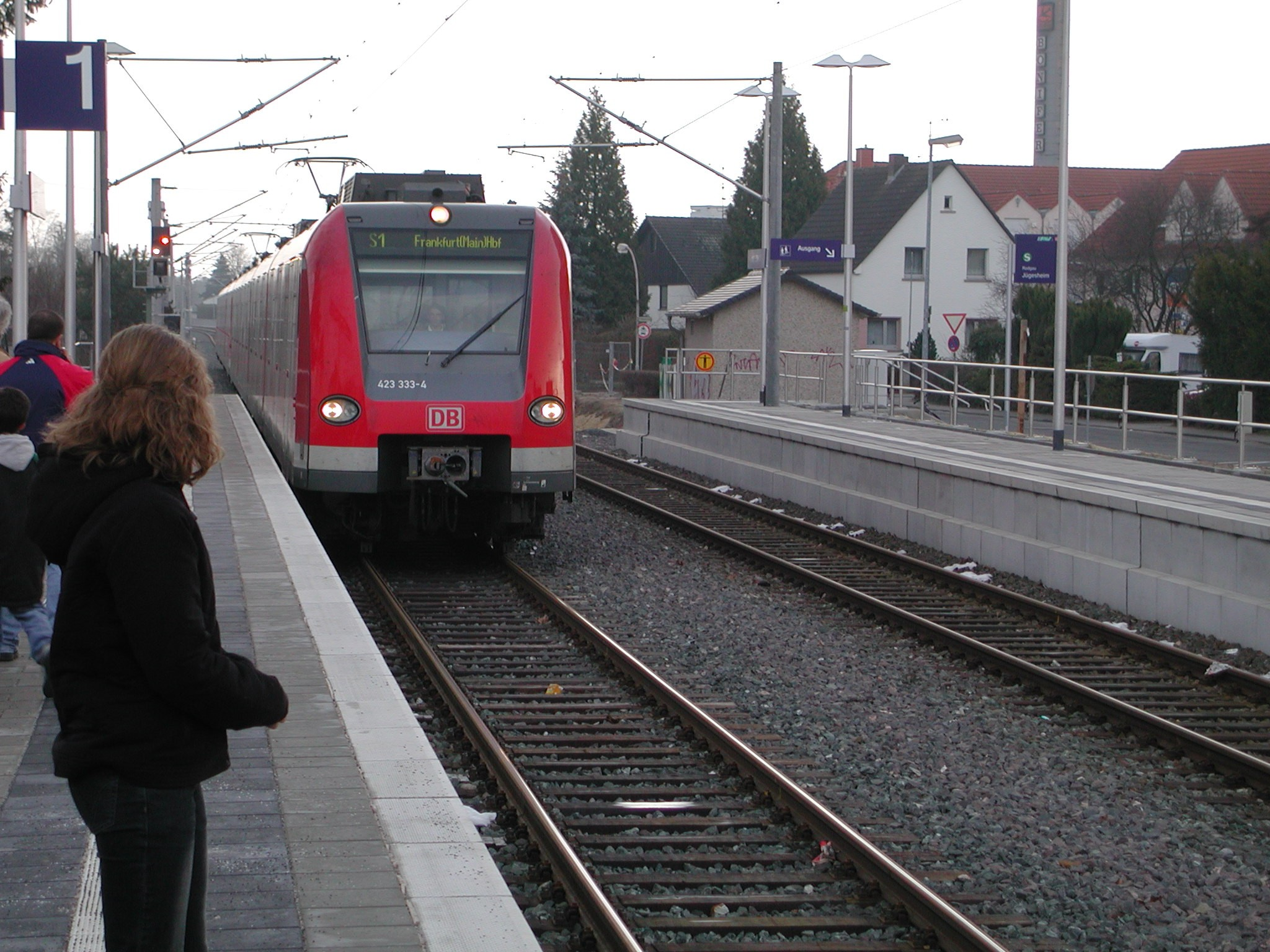
S1 in Rodgau-Jügesheim

S1 (Rhine-Main S-Bahn)							Journey time		Station	Transfer	S-Bahn service since
1	2	3	4	5	6	7					
=== Wiesbaden ===
							0		Wiesbaden Hbf	S8 (Rhine-Main S-Bahn) S9 (Rhine-Main S-Bahn)	1978
							4	+4	Wiesbaden Ost	S8 (Rhine-Main S-Bahn) S9 (Rhine-Main S-Bahn)	1978
							8	+4	Mainz-Kastel	S9 (Rhine-Main S-Bahn)	1978
=== Main-Taunus-Kreis ===
							12	+4	Hochheim		1978
							18	+6	Flörsheim		1978
							21	+3	Hattersheim-Eddersheim		1978
							24	+3	Hattersheim		1978
=== Frankfurt am Main ===
							28	+4	Frankfurt-Sindlingen		1978
							31	+3	Farbwerke	S2 (Rhine-Main S-Bahn)	1978
							33	+2	Frankfurt-Höchst	S2 (Rhine-Main S-Bahn)	1978
							36	+3	Frankfurt-Nied	S2 (Rhine-Main S-Bahn)	1978
							39	+3	Frankfurt-Griesheim	S2 (Rhine-Main S-Bahn)	1978
							46	+7	Frankfurt Hbf	U4 U5	1978
							43	+4	Frankfurt Hbf (tief)	U4 U5	1978
							45	+2	Taunusanlage	S2 (Rhine-Main S-Bahn) S3 (Rhine-Main S-Bahn) S4 (Rhine-Main S-Bahn) S5 (Rhine-Main S-Bahn) S6 (Rhine-Main S-Bahn) S8 (Rhine-Main S-Bahn) S9 (Rhine-Main S-Bahn)	1978
							47	+2	Hauptwache	U1 U2 U3 U6 U7 U8	1978
							48	+1	Konstablerwache	U4 U5 U6 U7	1983
							50	+2	Ostendstraße	S2 (Rhine-Main S-Bahn) S3 (Rhine-Main S-Bahn) S4 (Rhine-Main S-Bahn) S5 (Rhine-Main S-Bahn) S6 (Rhine-Main S-Bahn) S8 (Rhine-Main S-Bahn) S9 (Rhine-Main S-Bahn)	1990
							52	+2	Mühlberg	S2 (Rhine-Main S-Bahn) S8 (Rhine-Main S-Bahn) S9 (Rhine-Main S-Bahn)	1992
=== Offenbach ===
							55	+3	Offenbach-Kaiserlei	S2 (Rhine-Main S-Bahn) S8 (Rhine-Main S-Bahn) S9 (Rhine-Main S-Bahn)	1995
							57	+2	Ledermuseum	S2 (Rhine-Main S-Bahn) S8 (Rhine-Main S-Bahn) S9 (Rhine-Main S-Bahn)	1995
							58	+1	Marktplatz	S2 (Rhine-Main S-Bahn) S8 (Rhine-Main S-Bahn) S9 (Rhine-Main S-Bahn)	1995
							61	+3	Offenbach Ost	S2 (Rhine-Main S-Bahn) S8 (Rhine-Main S-Bahn) S9 (Rhine-Main S-Bahn)	1995
							64	+3	Offenbach-Bieber	S2 (Rhine-Main S-Bahn)	2003
=== Kreis Offenbach ===
							66	+2	Waldhof		2003
							69	+3	Obertshausen		2003
							72	+3	Rodgau-Weißkirchen		2003
							74	+2	Rodgau-Hainhausen		2003
							76	+2	Rodgau-Jügesheim		2003
							79	+3	Rodgau-Dudenhofen		2003
							81	+2	Rodgau-Nieder-Roden		2003
							84	+3	Rodgau-Rollwald		2003
							87	+3	Rödermark-Ober-Roden		2003
