= Hattersheim am Main =

- Town
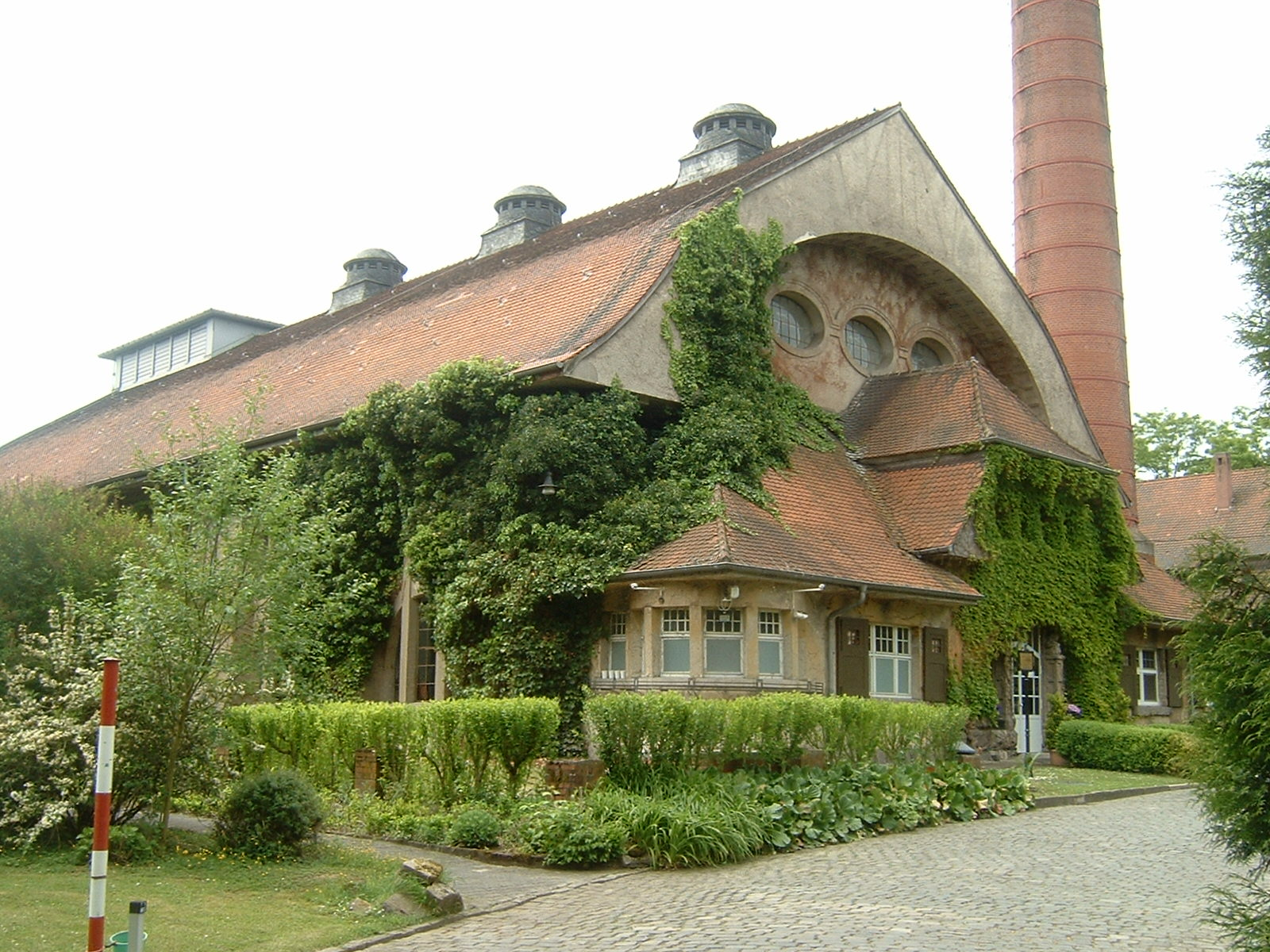
- Water works Hattersheim

- Coat of arms

- Location of Hattersheim am Main within Main-Taunus-Kreis district
- Interactive map of Hattersheim am Main
- Location within Germany Location within Hesse
- Coordinates: 50°04′20″N 08°29′11″E
- Country: Germany
- State: Hesse
- Admin. region: Darmstadt
- District: Main-Taunus-Kreis
- Subdivisions: 3 districts

Government
  - Mayor (2022–28): Klaus Schindling (CDU)

Area
  - Total: 15.8 km^{2} (6.1 sq mi)
- Elevation: 100 m (330 ft)

Population (2025-12-31)
  - Total: 28,820
  - Density: 1,820/km^{2} (4,720/sq mi)
- Time zone: UTC+01:00 (CET)
  - Summer (DST): UTC+02:00 (CEST)
- Postal codes: 65795
- Dialling codes: 06190, 06145
- Vehicle registration: MTK
- Website: www.hattersheim.de

Hattersheim am Main (German pronunciation: [ˈhatɐshaɪm ʔam ˈmaɪn], lit. 'Hattersheim on the Main') is a town in the Main-Taunus district, Hesse (Germany) and part of the Frankfurt Rhein-Main urban area.

== Geography ==
=== Neighbouring towns ===
Hattersheim borders the city of Frankfurt in the northeast, in the southeast with Kelsterbach, in the southwest with Raunheim (both are in the district of Groß-Gerau). The western neighboring towns are Flörsheim, Hofheim and Kriftel.

== Town districts ==
In 1972 the villages of Okriftel und Eddersheim, both situated next to the river Main, were incorporated into Hattersheim. Since then the town has been called Hattersheim am Main. Hattersheim consists of three districts: Eddersheim, Hattersheim und Okriftel.

=== Eddersheim ===
4944 people lived here in 2004. There is a lock on the river Main near the village's center. The engineer and inventor Anton Flettner was born in Eddersheim.

=== Okriftel ===
7561 people lived here in 2007. You can cross the river Main by ferry. The town on the other side of the river is Kelsterbach. The ferry boat operates in summer time on Sundays.

== History ==
A former industrial chocolate production of Sarotti chocolate and the Sarotti-Moor (Mohr) took place in Hattersheim am Main. With the change of the majority stockholding, in 1929, the factory merged to Nestlé. The factory in Hattersheim was in the 1960s one of the biggest companies in Hattersheim and Main-Taunus district with a workforce up to 2,000 workers. The factory was closed down in 1994 and currently it was designated a historic site in Hesse.

== Population ==
(as of 31 December)

- 1998 – 24,687
- 1999 – 24,756
- 2000 – 24,752
- 2001 – 24,858
- 2002 – 25,093
- 2003 – 25,059
- 2004 – 25,161
- 2019 – 27,674

== Twin towns – sister cities ==
Hattersheim am Main is twinned with:

- Mosonmagyaróvár, Hungary
- Santa Catarina, Cape Verde
- Sarcelles, France

== Transport ==
Hattersheim is served by two railway stations, Hattersheim am Main station and Eddersheim Station. Both are located on the S1 line of the Rhine-Main S-Bahn and see frequent service to Frankfurt, Wiesbaden and other regional destinations

Frankfurt Airport is located east of Hattersheim

Bundesautobahn 66 and Bundesautobahn 3 pass near Hattersheim

== Notable people ==
- Anton Flettner (1885–1961), inventor
