= Hochheim station =

Railway station in Hochheim am Main, Germany

Hochheim (Main)
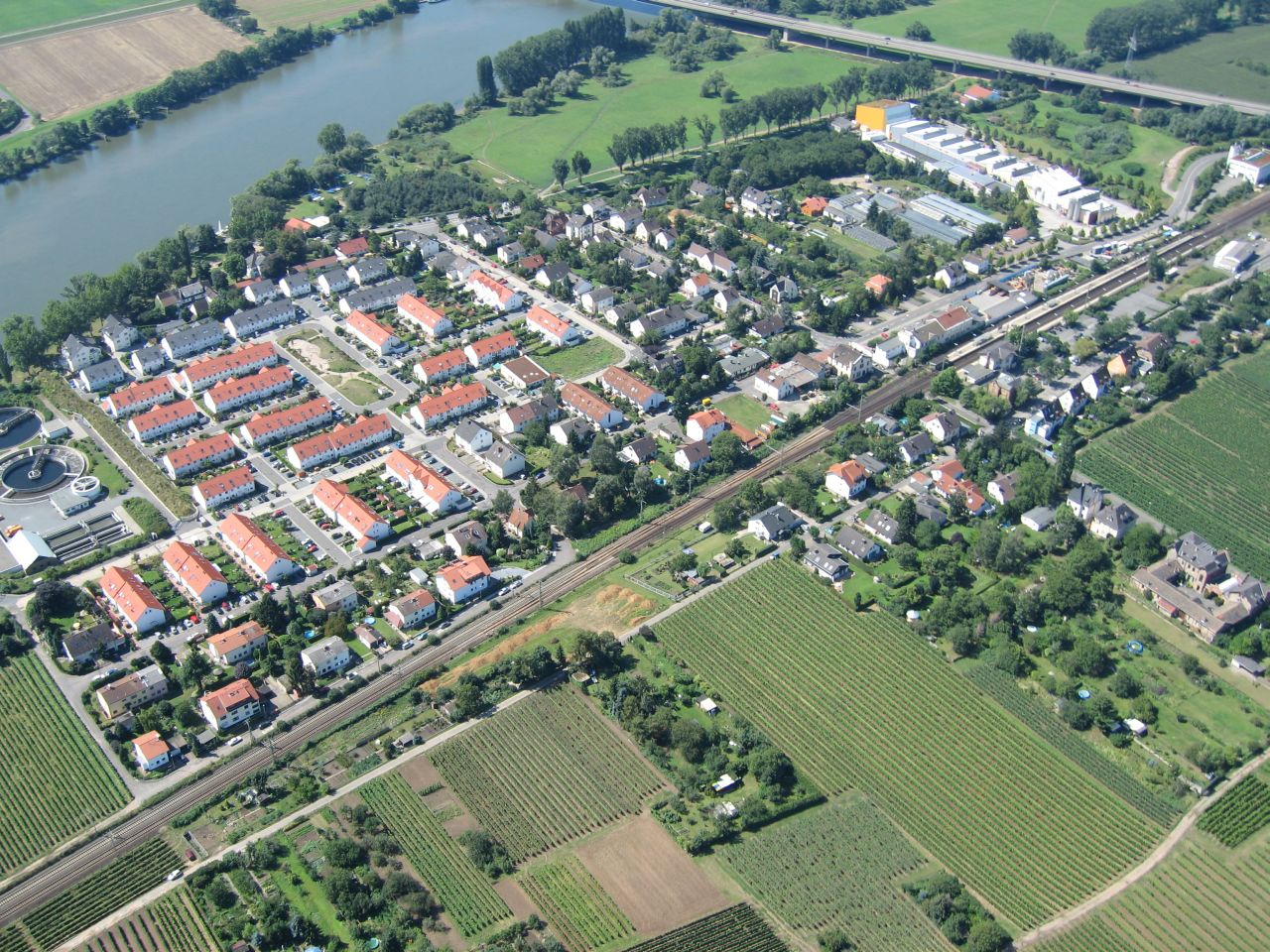
- The station in the upper right

General information
- Location: Hochheim, Hesse; Germany
- Coordinates: 50°0′15.3″N 8°21′1.4″E
- Line: Taunus Railway (km 28.4)
- Platforms: 3

Construction
- Accessible: Platform 1 only

Other information
- Station code: 2802
- DS100 code: FHM
- IBNR: 8002872
- Category: 5
- Fare zone: : 6683; RNN: 300 (RMV transitional tariff)
- Website: www.bahnhof.de

History
- Opened: 24 November 1839

Services
Preceding station	Rhine-Main S-Bahn	Following station
Mainz-Kastel towards Wiesbaden Hbf	S1 (Rhine-Main S-Bahn)	Flörsheim towards Rödermark-Ober Roden
Location
- Location within Hesse

Hochheim station is situated on the Frankfurt–Wiesbaden line (line number 3603; timetable section 645.1). It is in the town of Hochheim am Main, southwest of Frankfurt in the German state of Hesse. It is on the Taunus Railway (German: Taunus-Eisenbahn) from Wiesbaden to Frankfurt. The station is classified by Deutsche Bahn as a category 5 station.

== History ==
The station was opened on 24 November 1839 on the Taunus Railway, the oldest railway in Hesse, opened between 1839 and 1840. The station building dates from the foundation of the historically significant railway line and is one of the few surviving buildings from its foundation that is heritage listed in Main-Taunus-Kreis. It is a simple, rectangular, two-story stucco building with a mezzanine. It has a flat, overhanging roof supported on carved rafters and wide head struts.

== Infrastructure ==
The three track station is served by the trains of line S 1 of the Rhine-Main S-Bahn. It has a platform next to the station building and an island platform. S-Bahn services to Wiesbaden stop on platform 1. Services to Hattersheim, Frankfurt-Höchst, the Frankfurt Central underground station, the City Tunnel, Offenbach Ost, Obertshausen and Rodgau to Rödermark-Ober-Roden stop on platform 2. In peak hour some trains to Offenbach Ost or Rödermark-Ober-Roden start on platform 3.

The Hattersheim station is not accessible for the disabled.

== Services ==
Services, including ticketing, at Hochheim are organised by the Rhine-Main Transport Association (Rhein-Main-Verkehrsverbund, RMV).

=== S-Bahn ===
The S-Bahn runs from Monday to Friday every half hour on the route between Wiesbaden Central Station and Rödermark-Ober-Roden. Regional and long-distance services run through the station without stopping.

== Buses ==
The Hochheim Bahnhof bus stop is served by regional bus routes 48 and 809. Bus route 826 of Stadtverkehrs Hattersheim connects the station with central Hattersheim, the Heinrich-von-Bretano-Schule (school) and Hochheim's eastern industrial area.

The station also has a park and ride facility.
