= Hattersheim am Main station =

Railway station in Hattersheim, Hesse, Germany

Hattersheim (Main)
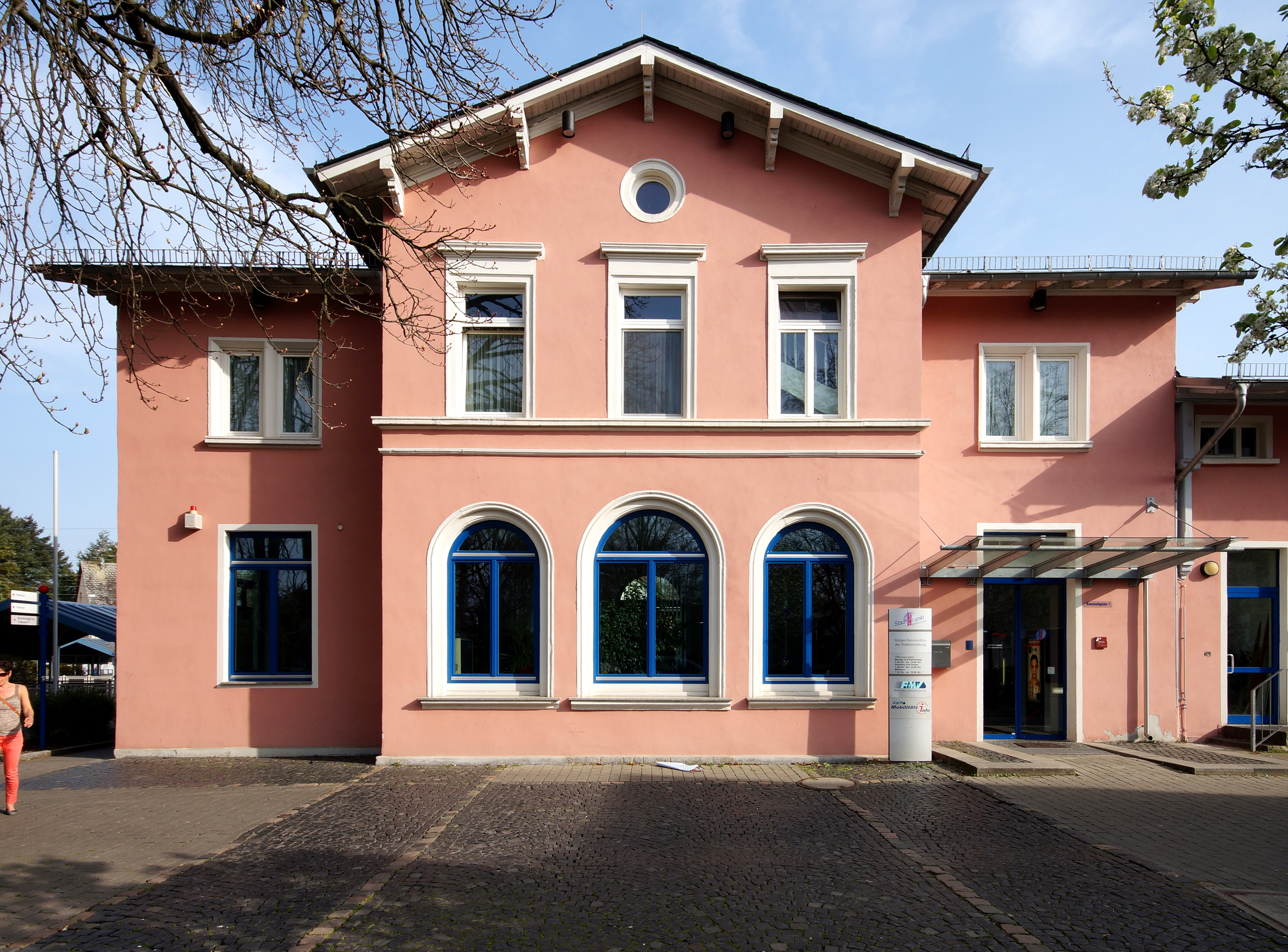
- Entrance building

General information
- Location: Bahnhofsplatz, Hattersheim am Main, Hesse; Germany
- Coordinates: 50°04′04″N 8°29′21″E
- Lines: Taunus Railway (14.9 km) (KBS 645.1)
- Platforms: 3

Construction
- Accessible: Platform 1 only

Other information
- Station code: 2589
- DS100 code: FHAS
- IBNR: 8002637
- Category: 4
- Fare zone: : 6665
- Website: www.bahnhof.de

History
- Opened: 24 November 1839

Services
Preceding station	Rhine-Main S-Bahn	Following station
Flörsheim towards Wiesbaden Hbf	S1 (Rhine-Main S-Bahn)	Frankfurt-Sindlingen towards Rödermark-Ober Roden
Location
- Location within Hesse

Hattersheim (Main) station is together with Hattersheim-Eddersheim station one of two S-Bahn stops in the town of Hattersheim, southwest of Frankfurt in the German state of Hesse. Both stations lie on the Taunus Railway (German: Taunus-Eisenbahn) from Wiesbaden to Frankfurt. The station is classified by Deutsche Bahn as a category 4 station.

== History ==
The station was opened on 24 November 1839 on the Taunus Railway, the oldest railway in Hesse, opened between 1839 and 1840. The station building was built in 1842. Hattersheim was initially a major hub for the carriage of mail by coach: it had one of the greatest postal operations of the House of Thurn and Taxis. With the opening of the station, the postal operation lost its significance. Hattersheim station is a monument of the Industrial Heritage Trail of the Rhine-Main (Route der Industriekultur Rhein-Main). The Sarotti plant in Hattersheim had its own railway siding.

== Infrastructure ==
The three track station is served by the trains of line S 1 of the Rhine-Main S-Bahn. It has a platform next to the station building and an island platform. S-Bahn services to Hochheim and Wiesbaden via Florsheim stop at platform 2. Services via Frankfurt-Höchst, the Frankfurt Central underground station, the City Tunnel, Offenbach Ost, Obertshausen and Rodgau to Rödermark-Ober-Roden stop at platform 3. In peak hour some short shuttle trains to Frankfurt Central Station start at platform 1.

The Hattersheim station is not accessible for the disabled.

== Services ==
=== S-Bahn ===
The S- Bahn runs from Monday to Friday every half hour on the route between Wiesbaden Central Station and Rödermark-Ober-Roden. In the morning and afternoon peaks trains run every quarter of an hour with every second train beginning in Hochheim. Regional and long distance services run through the station without stopping.

=== Buses ===
The Hattersheim Bahnhof Süd bus stop is served by the buses of Stadtverkehrs Hattersheim. These connect the station with central Hattersheim, Eddersheim and Okriftel.

The station also has a park and ride facility.
