= Flörsheim (Main) station =

Railway station in Flörsheim am Main, Germany

Flörsheim (Main)
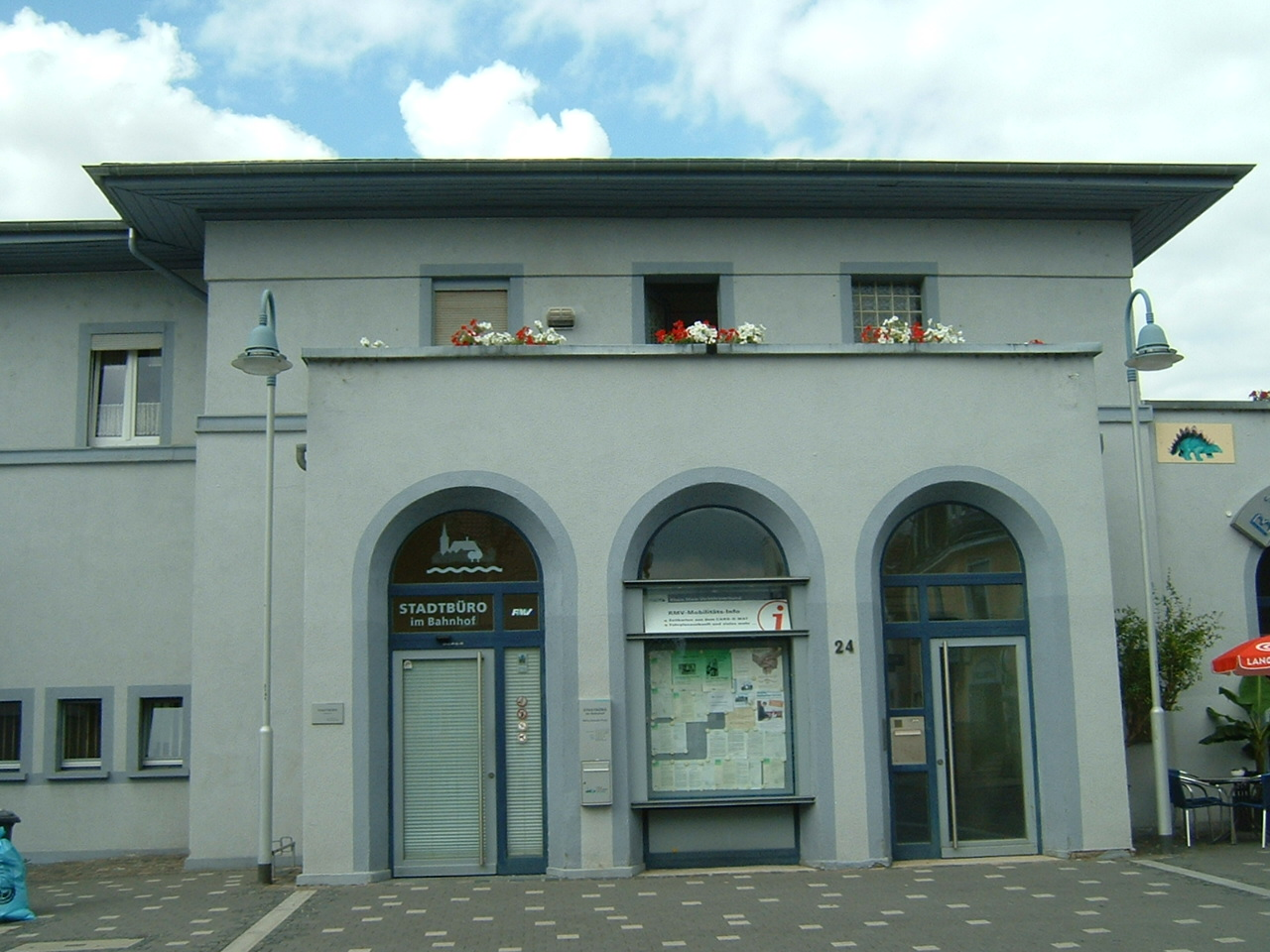
- Entrance building

General information
- Location: Bahnhofstr. 24, 50181 Flörsheim am Main, Hesse; Germany
- Coordinates: 50°01′02″N 8°25′53″E
- Lines: Taunus Railway (km 21.9) (KBS 645.1)
- Platforms: 3

Construction
- Accessible: Yes (but low platforms)
- Architect: Ignaz Opfermann
- Architectural style: Neoclassical

Other information
- Station code: 1818
- DS100 code: FFH
- IBNR: 8002013
- Category: 4
- Fare zone: : 6673
- Website: www.bahnhof.de

History
- Opened: 13 April 1840

Services
Preceding station	Rhine-Main S-Bahn	Following station
Hochheim towards Wiesbaden Hbf	S1 (Rhine-Main S-Bahn)	Hattersheim am Main towards Rödermark-Ober Roden
Location
- Location within Hesse

Flörsheim (Main) station is the station of Flörsheim am Main in the German state of Hesse. It lies on the Taunus Railway, which connects Frankfurt and Wiesbaden.

== History ==
Florsheim station was opened on 13 April 1840 with the Taunus Railway, which was one of the first railways in Germany and ran between the Free City of Frankfurt and the capital of the Duchy of Nassau, Wiesbaden.

Services on line S1 of the Rhine-Main S-Bahn have stopped in Flörsheim since the network started operating in May 1978.

== Entrance building ==
The core of the Neoclassical entrance building at Florsheim dates back to the construction of the station. It was built in 1839 to a design of the Mainz district architect Ignaz Opfermann, but it was altered later. Thus its core forms one of the oldest preserved entrance buildings in Germany. The original building was a functional building with a symmetrical design and a gabled roof, which is typical of the old stations on the Taunus Railway.

In 1875, the upper floor was added as the station master's apartment and a wooden goods shed with a typical cantilevered roof was also built. On the ground floor there was a ticket office, a supervisor's room and an office for handling goods. The pedestrian subway was built around 1910. The station precinct is part of the Route of Industrial Heritage of the Rhine-Main: Hessian Lower Main (Route der Industriekultur Rhein-Main Hessischer Unterer Main).

After the renovation of the building, the Flörsheim municipal offices moved into the historic station building. It also contains a shop and an apartment. The former goods shed now houses a club for children and youth.

The entrance building is listed as a cultural monument under the Hessian heritage law.

== Infrastructure ==
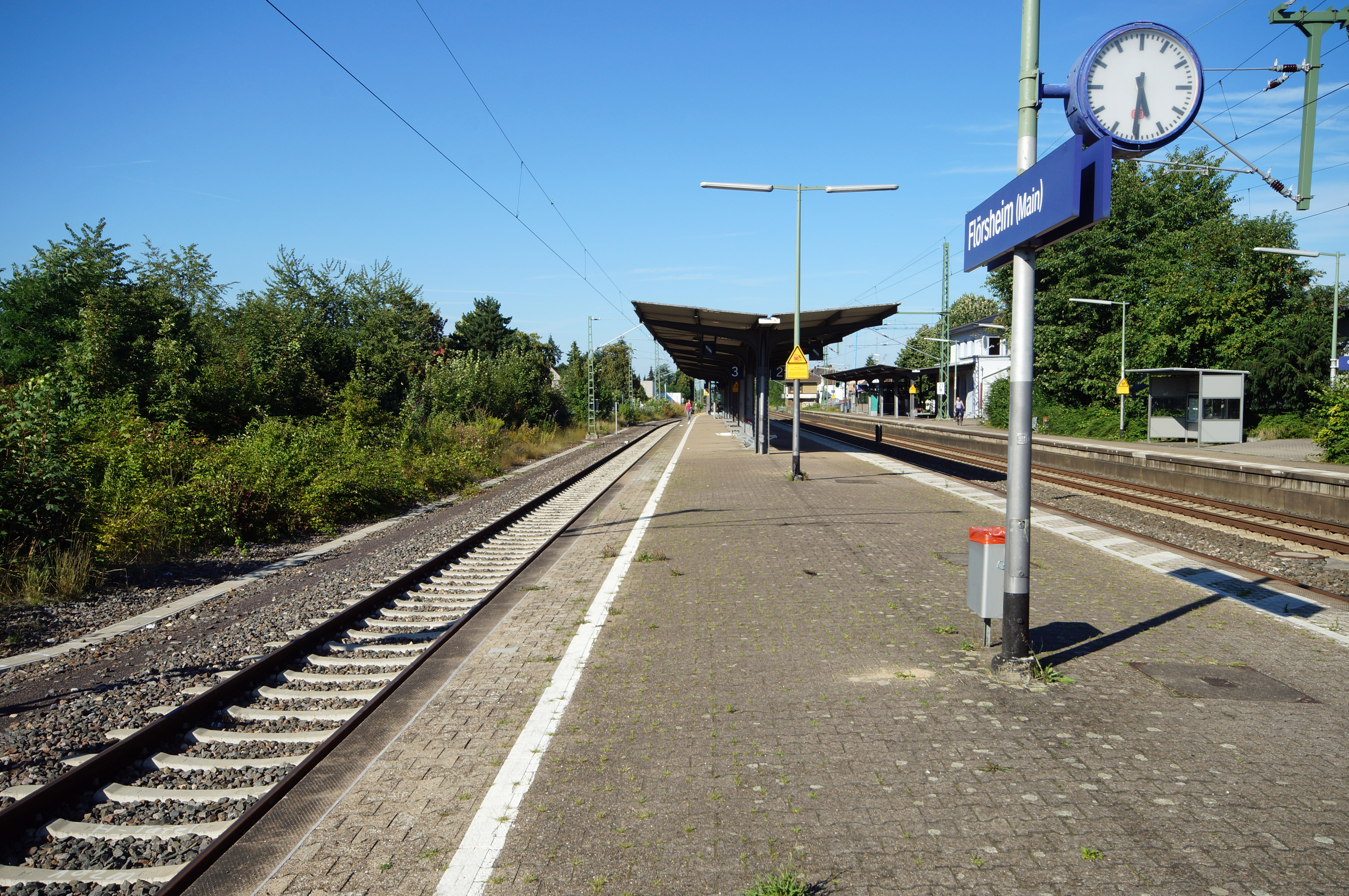
Platforms of Flörsheim station

Only trains of the S1 of Rhine-Main S-Bahn stop on the three platform tracks of Flörsheim station. It has a "house" and an island platform. Tracks 1 and 2 are used by S-Bahn services running via Hattersheim, Frankfurt-Höchst, Frankfurt Hauptbahnhof, the Frankfurt and Offenbach city tunnels, Obertshausen and Rodgau to Ober-Roden (track 1) and to Wiesbaden Hauptbahnhof via Hochheim and Mainz-Kastel (track 2). Track 3 serves is only used for unscheduled over-taking movements or as a diversion route during track work.

Flörsheim station is barrier-free as there is a lift on the platforms. However, the platforms are too low for the Class 430 multiple units used: wheelchair users still need assistance boarding and alighting.

The access to additional sidings (which were often used for trains running to/from a tank farm) and the loading ramp and the loading road were separated during the construction of an underpass between 2011 and 2013.

== Operations ==
Fares in Flörsheim are set by the Rhein-Main-Verkehrsverbund (RMV).

=== S-Bahn ===
S-Bahn services run on the S1 line every half hour from Monday to Friday on the Wiesbaden – Rödermark-Ober-Roden route. During the peak, services run every quarter of an hour, with every second train beginning or ending in neighbouring Hochheim.

=== Bus services ===
There are two bus stops at Flörsheim station:

- the Flörsheim Bahnhof Südseite bus stop is on the south side in Willy-Brandt-Platz, which is served by Rüsselsheim municipal bus route 1 (Flörsheim – Rüsselsheim) as well as regional bus routes 809 (Hofheim – Flörsheim – Hochheim) and AST route 818 (Flörsheim – Wicker – Weilbach).
- the smaller Flörsheim Bahnhof Nordseite bus stop on the north side of the station at the commuter parking area, which is served by regional bus routes 809 (Hofheim – Flörsheim – Hochheim) and 819 (Flörsheim – Wicker – Weilbach) as well as AST routes 818 and 819 (both to/from Flörsheim – Wicker – Weilbach).
