= Frankfurt-Nied station =

Railway station in Frankfurt, Germany

Frankfurt Nied
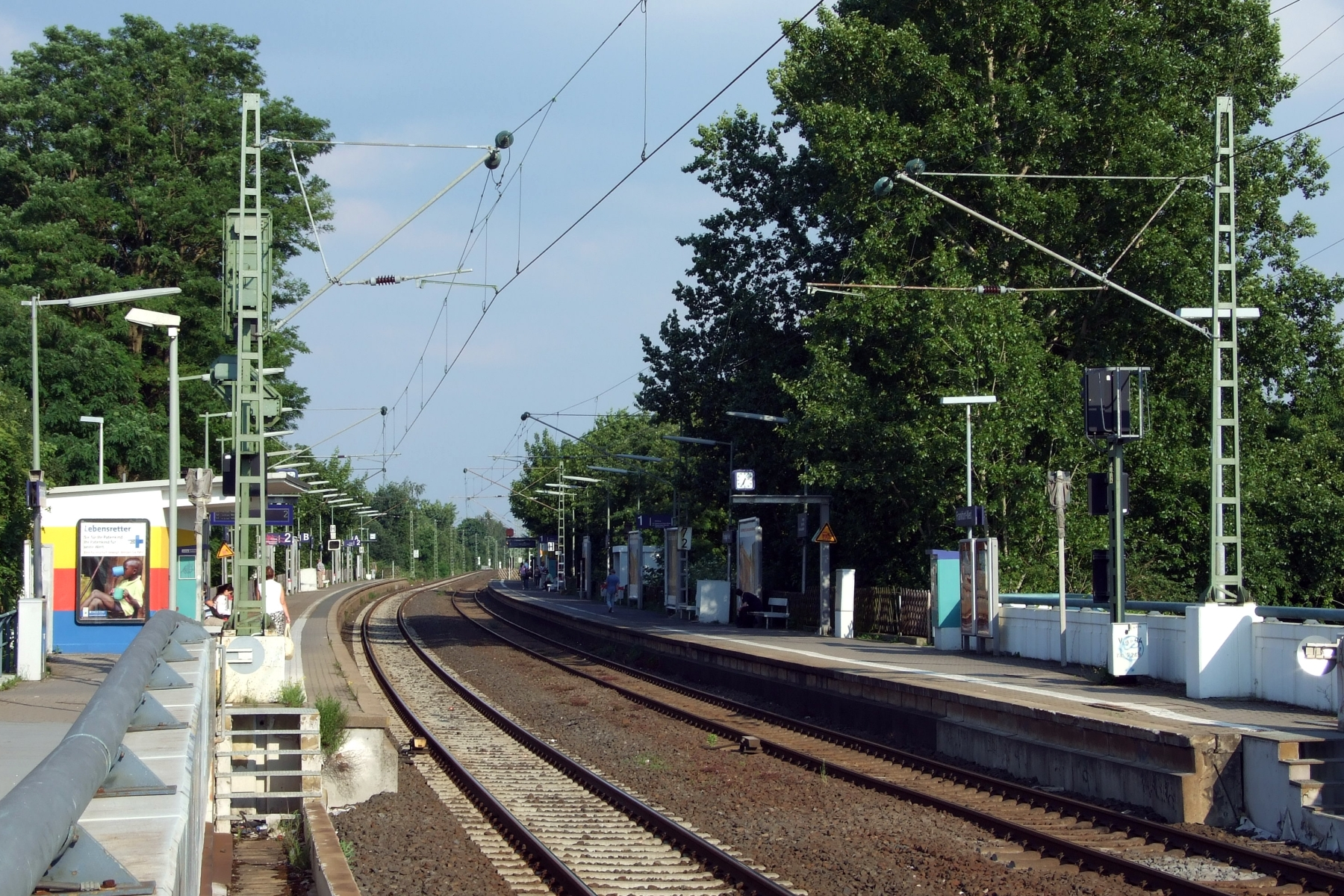
- Platform 1 (city-bound)

General information
- Location: Oeserstr. 12; Nied, Hesse; Germany
- Coordinates: 50°6′10″N 8°34′12″E
- Lines: Main-Lahn Railway (7.3 km) (KBS 627/645.2; (Taunus Railway) (KBS 645.1)
- Platforms: 2

Construction
- Accessible: Yes

Other information
- Station code: 1875
- DS100 code: FFND
- IBNR: 8002049
- Category: 5
- Fare zone: : 5001
- Website: www.bahnhof.de

History
- Opened: 1888

Services
Preceding station	Rhine-Main S-Bahn	Following station
Frankfurt-Höchst towards Wiesbaden Hbf	S1 (Rhine-Main S-Bahn)	Frankfurt-Griesheim towards Rödermark-Ober Roden
Frankfurt-Höchst towards Niedernhausen	S2 (Rhine-Main S-Bahn)	Frankfurt-Griesheim towards Dietzenbach
Location
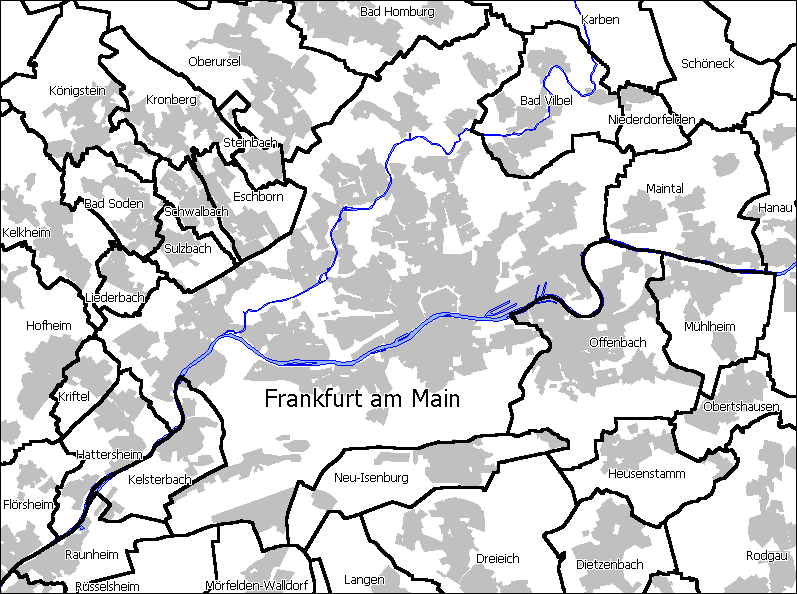
- Location within Frankfurt am Main Location within Hesse Location within Germany Location within Europe

Frankfurt-Nied station is a station in the district of Nied of the city of Frankfurt in the German state of Hesse on the Main-Lahn Railway. It is now served only by lines S1 and S 2 of the Rhine-Main S-Bahn. The station is classified by Deutsche Bahn as a category 5 station.

== Location ==
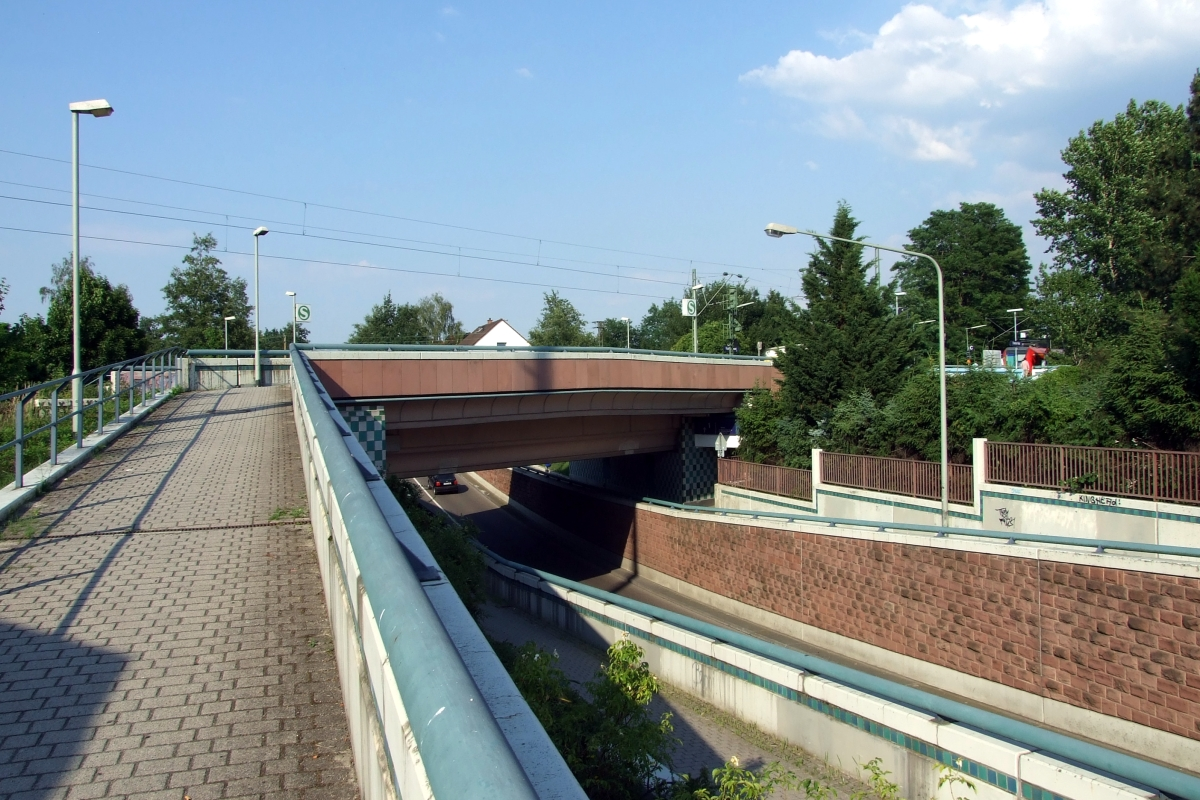
Oeserstraße underpass

The station is located in the district of Nied at the crossing of the Main-Lahn railway over the street of Oeserstraße. It forms the border between the boroughs of Nied-Nord and Nied-Süd and thus separates new developments to the south and traditional village architecture to the north. North-west of the station is Kahnplatz and Nied Cemetery.

The station has a structural resemblance to Frankfurt-Sindlingen station: Oeserstraße passes through an underpass under the railway tracks, while foot traffic reaches the platforms by separate walkways and steps.

There is a long-term plan to relocate the station from Oeserstraße to Mainzer Landstrasse to create a better connection to tram line 11.

== History ==
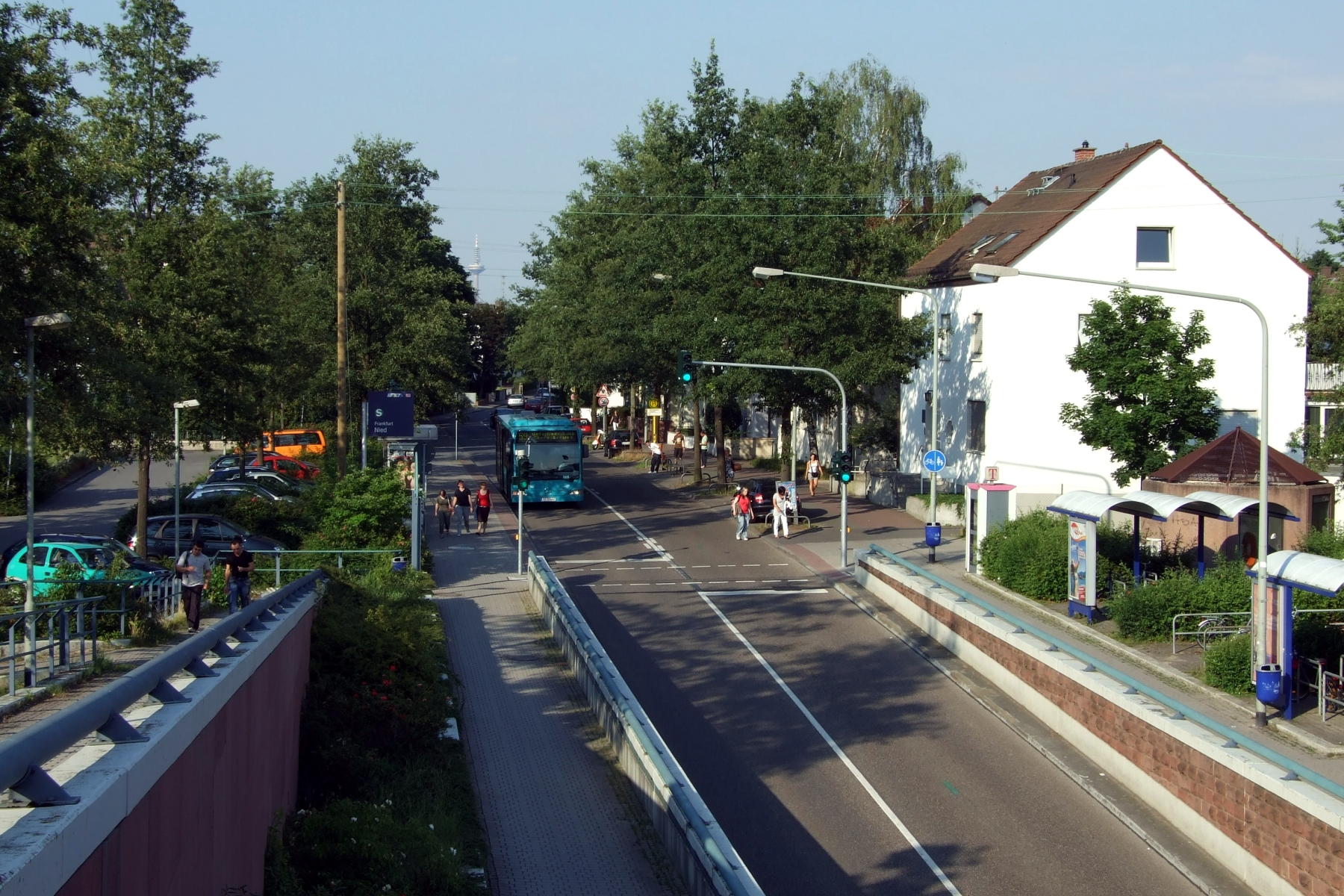
Bus stop and covered bicycle rack

The Main-Lahn Railway was opened through Nied in 1879. In 1888, the station was opened in the then independent village at the intersection with Rödelheimer Straße (now Oeserstraße). The small station building was soon insufficient and it was replaced in 1915 by a larger, prestigious building to the north-west of Oeserstraße. At the establishment of the Rhine-Main S-Bahn, the platforms were moved to the southeastern side of Oeserstraße and the station building lost its function. The level crossing on Oeserstraße was replaced by an underpass in 1988.

The first covered bicycle rack in Frankfurt was established at Nied station in 1990; this launched the new concept of "bike and ride" for the promotion of the combination of public transport and cycling in Frankfurt. Since April 2008, the platforms have been equipped with digital passenger information displays.

== Operations ==
The station is served by S-Bahn lines S 1 and S 2. The station is also served by bus line 59, which stops at the Nied Bahnhof/Lotzstraße and Nied Bahnhof/Friedhof bus stops.

The lines S1 and S2 normally operate at 30-minute intervals and hourly at times of low traffic, so that in combination trains run at 15 or 30 minute intervals. Both lines are reinforced during peak hours by services running from the west, which terminate above ground at Frankfurt Central Station, rather than running through the Frankfurt City Tunnel. Line S1 is also reinforced by such services at lunch time. The travel time to the city centre is about ten minutes.
