= Deutsche Bank Twin Towers =

Twin tower skyscraper complex in Germany

- Hauptverwaltung Deutsche Bank AG
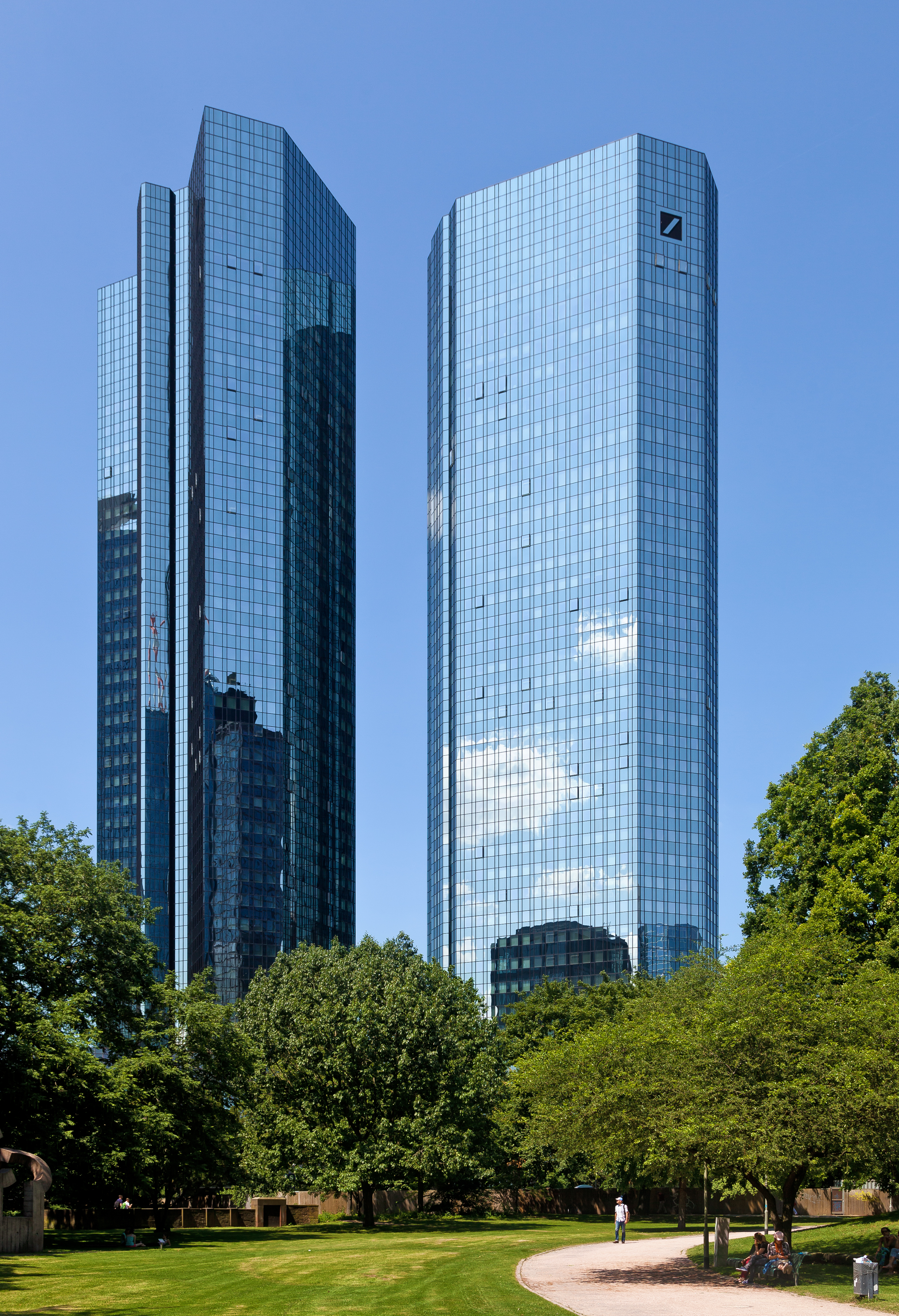
- The Deutsche Bank Twin Towers in the central business district of Frankfurt
- Alternative names: Credit und Debit; Hauptverwaltung Deutsche Bank AG; Zwillingstürme der Deutschen Bank

General information
- Location: Taunusanlage 12; Frankfurt; Hesse, Germany
- Coordinates: 50°06′49″N 8°40′05″E
- Construction started: 1978
- Completed: 1984

Height
- Roof: Tower I: 155 m (509 ft); Tower II: 155 m (509 ft)

Technical details
- Floor count: Tower I: 40; Tower II: 38
- Floor area: 645,834 sq ft (60,000 m^{2})

Design and construction
- Architects: Walter Hanig; Heinz Scheid; Johannes Schmidt
- Structural engineer: Grontmij BGS Ingenieursozietät

Other information
- Public transit: Taunusanlage

The Deutsche Bank Twin Towers, also known as Deutsche Bank Headquarters (German: Zwillingstürme der Deutschen Bank or Hauptverwaltung Deutsche Bank AG), is a twin tower skyscraper complex in the Westend-Süd district of Frankfurt, Germany. Both towers rise to 155 m (509 ft) and serve as headquarters for Deutsche Bank, the largest bank in Germany.

== Location ==
The Deutsche Bank Twin Towers are prominently located at the borders of the city districts of Westend-Süd, the Bahnhofsviertel and the Innenstadt, near a series of baroque-era-fortifications-gone-parks (Wallanlagen) and the Opernplatz. This area forms Frankfurts central business district called Bankenviertel.

The twin towers are part of a chain of high-rise buildings at Mainzer Landstraße which stretches from the Opernplatz in the east to the Platz der Republik in the west. The towers have direct access to an underground S-Bahn station (Taunusanlage). The largest man-shaped monolith of the world, created by the Swiss sculptor Max Bill, is located in front of the entrance.

== Architecture ==
The towers were built from 1979 to 1984 originally to house a hotel for the Hyatt Hotel Group. The buildings were already under construction when Hyatt cancelled its plans and Deutsche Bank decided to locate its headquarters there. The complex consists of three parts: a four-storey base building and the two towers. The buildings are complete reinforced concrete structures with reflective glass facades.

In contrast to the neighboring high-rise Trianon, built a few years later, the pedestal of the Deutsche Bank skyscraper adapts to the urban environment. It is lower than the neighboring buildings, but spread out over a large base area. From the center of the plant, between the two towers, stretch on an irregular floor plan three components to the east, southwest and northwest.

The towers are irregular trapezoidal shapes, but both feature identical floors plans that have symmetric 45-degree angles arranged 13 m (43 ft) from the center of the plant around.

The buildings have become a popular backdrop in print media and television as a symbol for the German economy because of the role that Deutsche Bank plays as one of the most important global banking and financial services companies.

== Construction ==
The towers share a 4,660 m^{2} (50,200 ft^{2}; 0.466 ha; 1.15 acres) foundation slab, which is 4 m (13 ft) thick in the middle and tapers towards the edges to 2.5 m (8 ft 2 in). The panel consists of 16,122 m^{3} (569,300 cu ft) of reinforced concrete. The formation depth is approximately 13 m (43 ft) below ground level.

== Renovation ==
In 2006, Deutsche Bank decided that the towers would undergo a major renovation after 22 years due to changes in fire regulations. The renovation took place from 2007 until 2011. The work improved the fire protection systems and replaced the entire climate, water and lighting technology. This reduced energy consumption and CO_{2} emissions in the building at least 50 percent. A re-glazing with opening windows improved the energy balance further. The goal was to certify the building as a green building according to American standard LEED certification with the highest platinum for existing buildings, and the German seal of approval DGNB. The towers were the first high-rises to be given this certification by the U.S. Green Building Council. For the interior, the Bank chose Milanese architect Mario Bellini. During the work, approximately 2,500 employees were relocated to three other sites in Frankfurt, including the Investment Banking Center near the trade fair.

After a three-year renovation period, the 155 m (509 ft) Deutsche Bank towers were officially re-opened on 14 February 2011 in a ceremony attended by guests from politics, business and society. Almost 26 years ago to the day, in February 1985, Deutsche Bank’s headquarters at Taunusanlage 12 were formally opened for the first time. Since then, the towers have become landmarks of Frankfurt and symbols of Germany as a financial centre. Josef Ackermann, Chairman of the Management Board of Deutsche Bank AG, explained that “These towers are not just Frankfurt landmarks, they are also trademarks of a Deutsche Bank that is strong, aware of its social responsibility, and globally-oriented but still has its roots in Frankfurt and Germany. These towers stand, in the truest sense of the word, for Deutsche Bank. We are truly at home here.” Prof. Mario Bellini, designer and architect from Milan: “The towers are symbols of a very solid company that has grown over many years, one that is built on strong foundations but at the same time remains highly dynamic.”

Deutsche Bank used the renovation of the towers to implement many innovative and progressive ideas, primarily in the field of ecology. For example, the bank has cut its energy supply by a half, water consumption by over 70 percent and CO_{2} emissions by almost 90 percent, making the new towers one of the most eco-friendly high-rise buildings in the world.

The towers received the highest possible certifications of LEED Platinum and DGNB Gold for their resource and energy efficiency. Scot Horst (U.S. Green Building Council) and Professor Manfred Hegger (German Sustainable Building Council) presented the two certificates to Hermann-Josef Lamberti who, as Chief Operating Officer, was the Deutsche Bank Management Board member responsible for the renovation. Petra Roth, Mayor of the City of Frankfurt am Main, emphasized in her welcoming remarks the importance of green and sustainable buildings in urban development. “We are delighted that the modernization of the Deutsche Bank towers has attracted interest worldwide. Frankfurt deserves its reputation as a 'green city' in many ways. This is a goal that we have been working towards for many years, and one that we have further highlighted by applying for the 2014 European Green Capital Award.”

== Ownership ==
In 2007, Deutsche Bank purchased the complex for approximately €271 million from a closed-end fund which owned it since 1984. Estimates say work on the building cost the bank €200 million. In March 2011, the bank announced it would sell the towers to DWS Investments, another closed-end real estate fund owned by the bank's asset-management division for €600 million.

== Gallery ==
Deutsche Bank Twin Towers
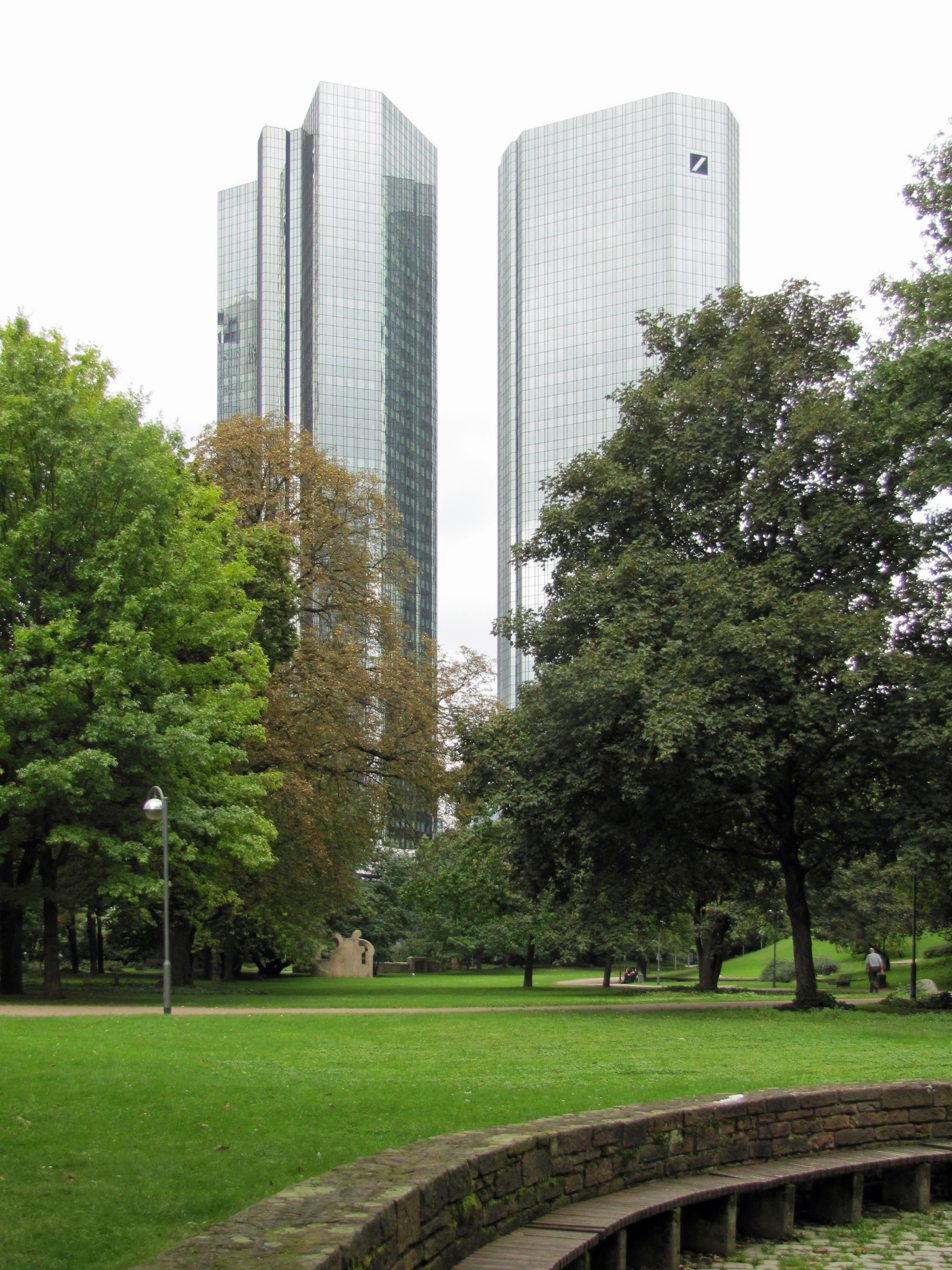

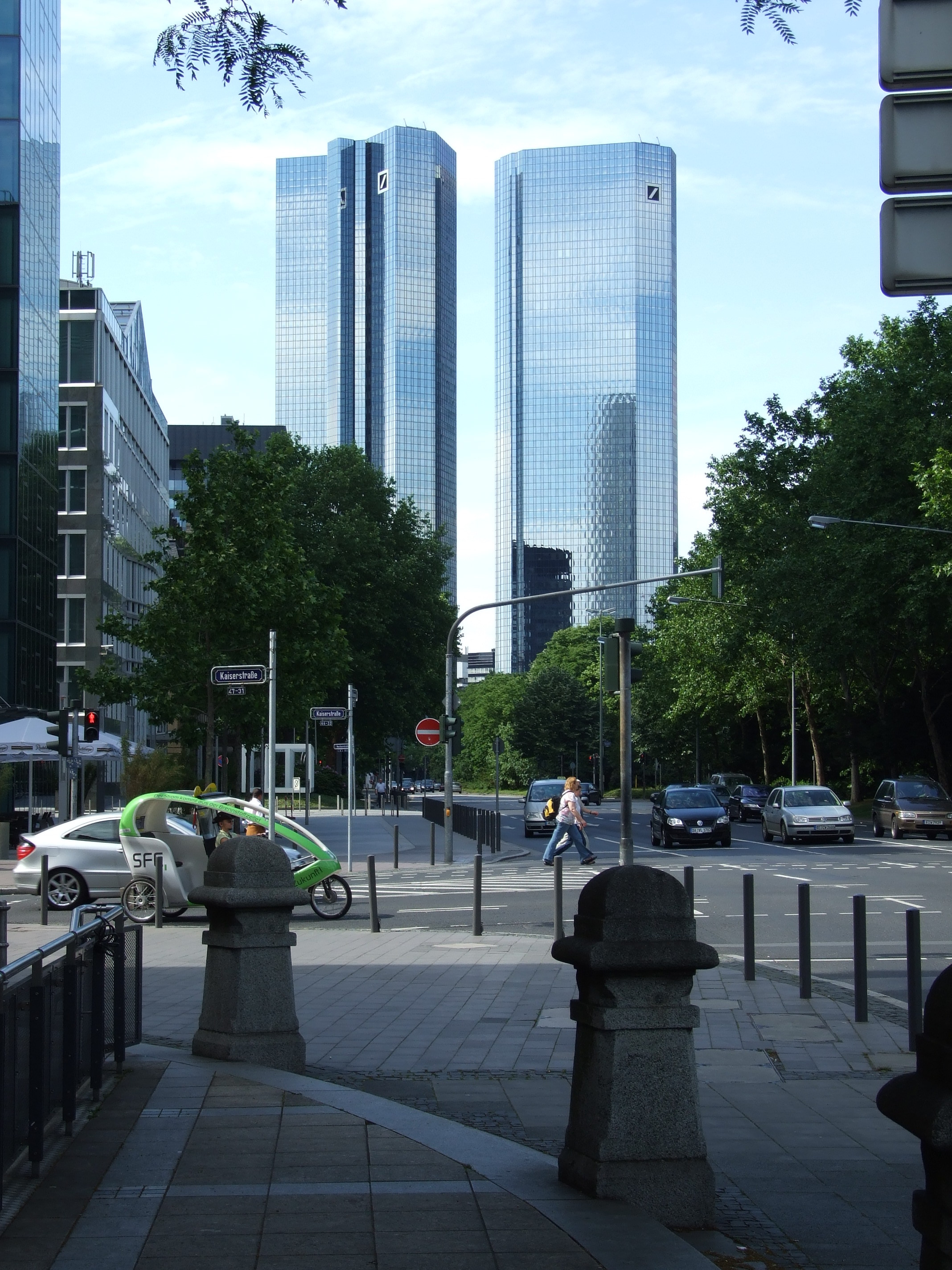

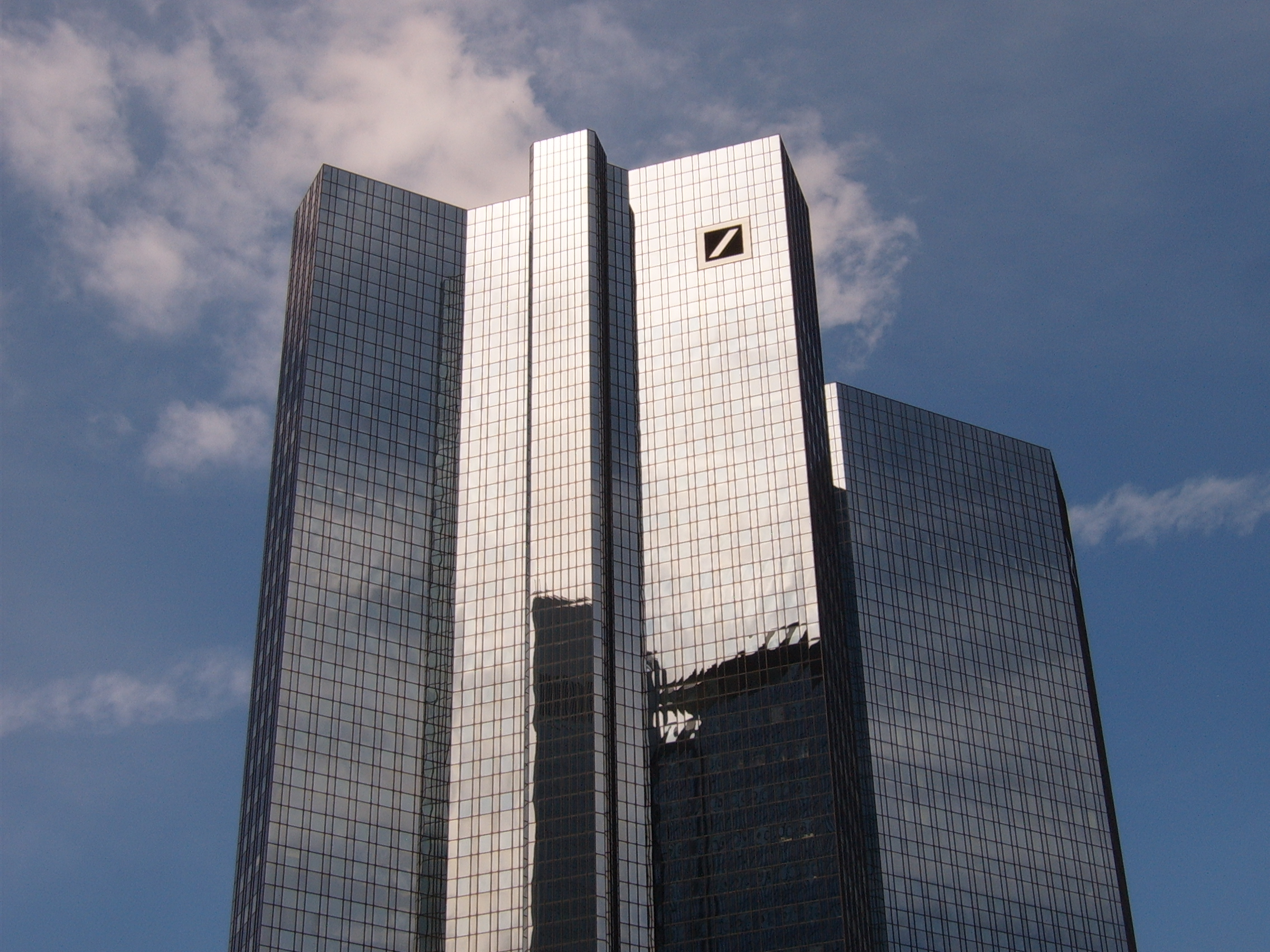

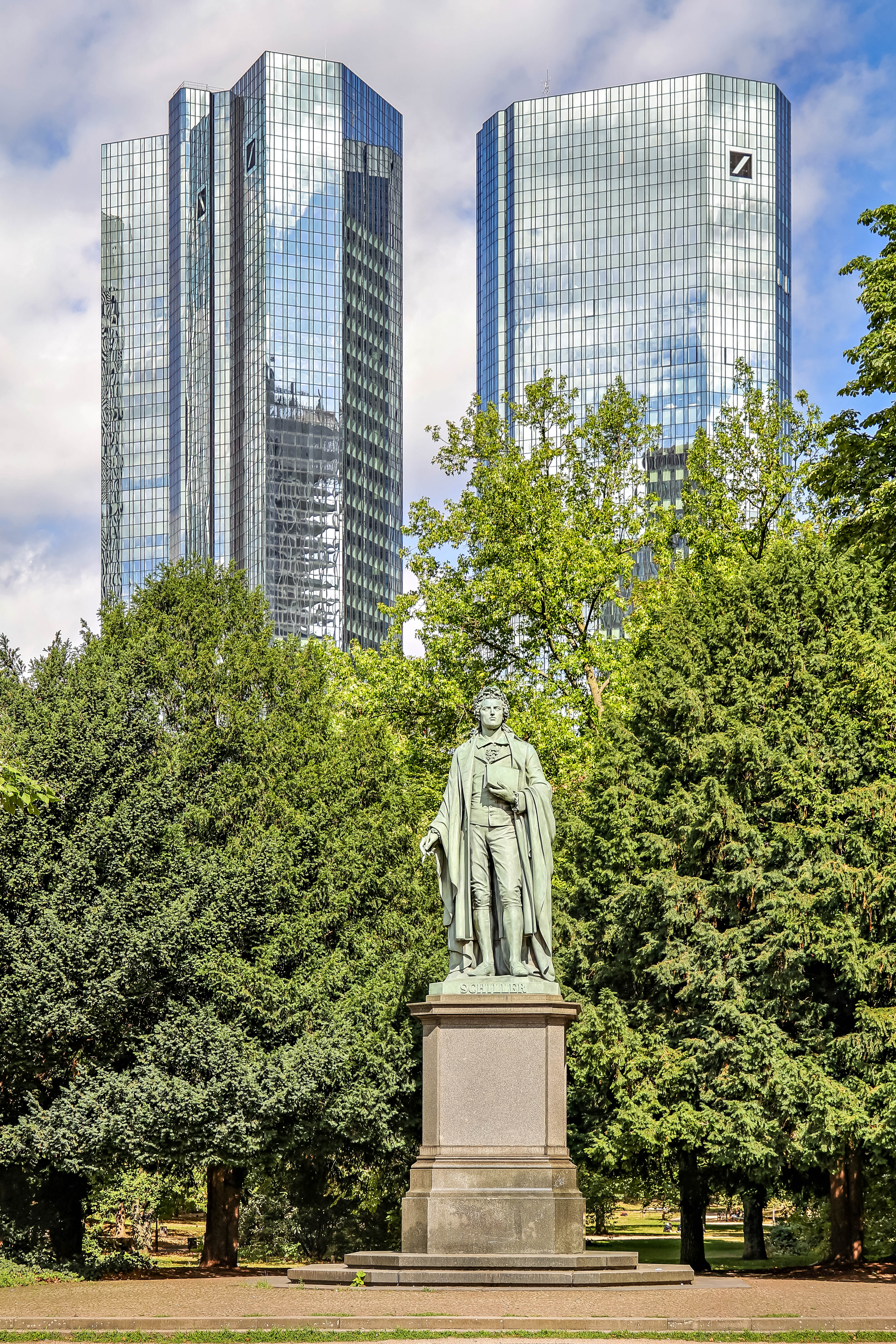

== In popular culture ==
- In the second season of Supergirl the twin towers were used as the Department of Extranormal Operations (D.E.O.).

== Trivia ==
- The opposing towers are sometimes jokingly referred to as "Soll und Haben" – "credit and debit".

== See also ==
- List of tallest buildings in Frankfurt
- List of tallest buildings in Germany
- List of tallest buildings in Europe
