= Frankfurt-Griesheim station =

Railway station in Frankfurt, Germany

Frankfurt Griesheim
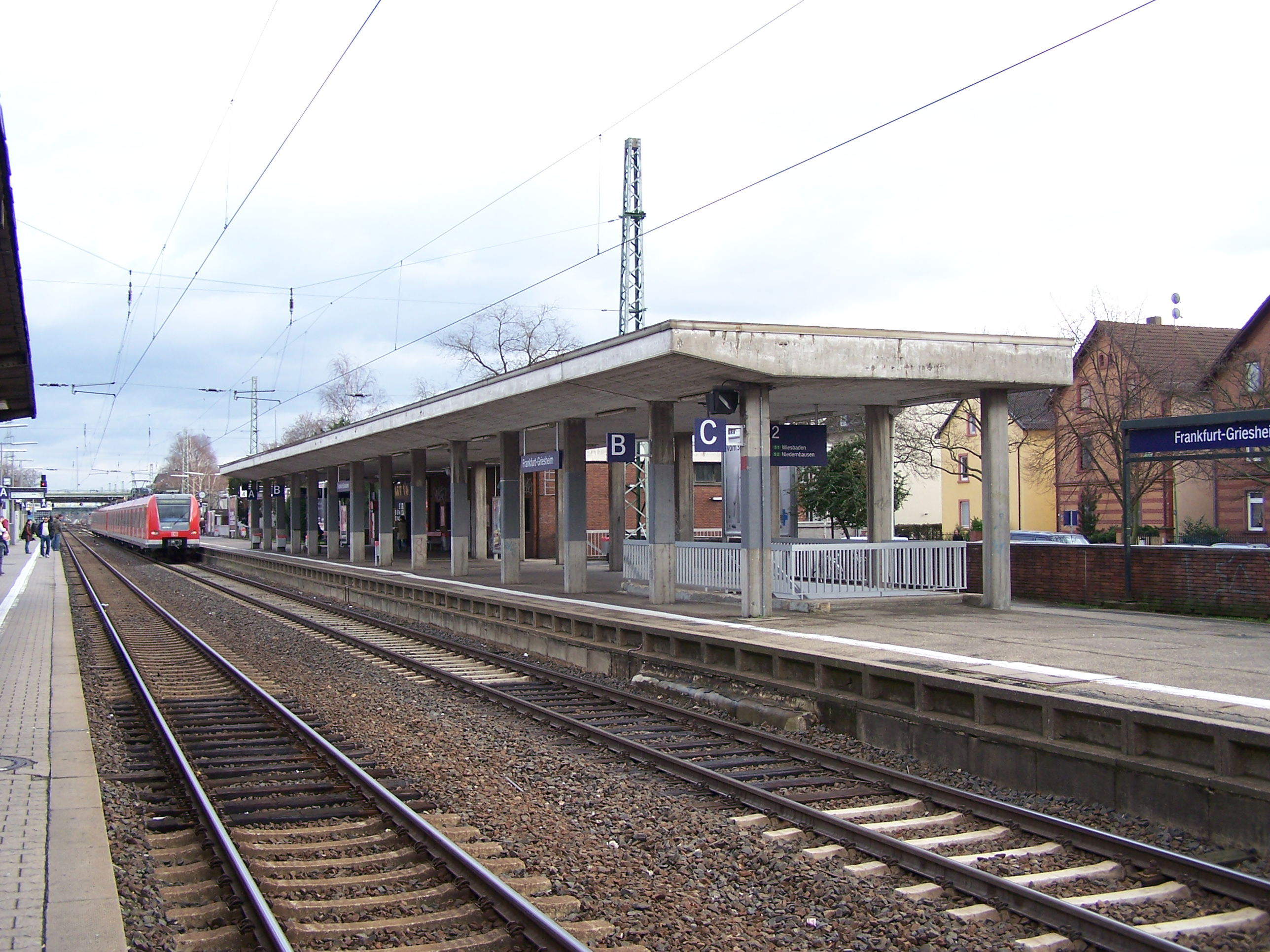
- Home platform looking towards Frankfurt Hbf

General information
- Location: Autogenstr. 13; Frankfurt, Hesse; Germany
- Coordinates: 50°5′39″N 8°36′22″E
- Lines: Main-Lahn Railway (4.5 km) (KBS 627/645.2); (Taunus Railway) (KBS 645.1); Frankfurt City Link Line
- Platforms: 3

Other information
- Station code: 1871
- DS100 code: FGM
- IBNR: 8002046
- Category: 4
- Fare zone: : 5001
- Website: www.bahnhof.de

History
- Opened: 1871

Services
Preceding station	Rhine-Main S-Bahn	Following station
Frankfurt-Nied towards Wiesbaden Hbf	S1 (Rhine-Main S-Bahn)	Frankfurt Hbf towards Rödermark-Ober Roden
Frankfurt-Nied towards Niedernhausen	S2 (Rhine-Main S-Bahn)	Frankfurt Hbf towards Dietzenbach
Location

Frankfurt-Griesheim station (German: Bahnhof Frankfurt-Griesheim) is a railway station located in the Griesheim district of Frankfurt, Germany.

The station is part of the Main-Lahn Railway. It is at the beginning of the western approach to Frankfurt Hauptbahnhof, which runs for about five kilometres and is up to 600 metres wide. The station is classified by Deutsche Bahn as a category 4 station. Today it is served only by lines S1 and S 2 of the Rhine-Main S-Bahn.

== History ==
The station was built in 1877 by the Hessian Ludwig Railway (Hessische Ludwigsbahn) along with the Main-Lahn railway to the north of the town centre of Griesheim. The current station building was built in 1968. The station is now served only by S-Bahn lines S1 (Wiesbaden–Rödermark-Ober-Roden) and S2 (Niedernhausen–Dietzenbach). The station has an island platform and a side platform, three platform tracks altogether.

Just east of the station, the Frankfurt City Link Line (Städtische Verbindungsbahn) branches to the south-east to the East Harbour (Osthafen). Freight and passenger trains are operated on the line by HFM Managementgesellschaft für Hafen und Markt mbH ("HFM Management Company for the Port and Market") and passenger trains are sometimes operated by the Historischen Eisenbahn Frankfurt ("Historic Railway, Frankfurt", CEF), using steam and diesel locomotives and railbuses.

From 1930 until the start of the operations of the Rhine-Main S-Bahn in 1978, the station was also a stop on tram line 14.

== Location ==
The station is now in the centre of Griesheim, the largest district in the western part of Frankfurt, between the Main and the Mainzer Landstraße. South of it is the historic heart of Griesheim, north of it are new estates built in the mid-20th century. The two districts are connected by a bridge to the east and a level crossing to the west.

On the opposite side of the adjacent Autogenstraße (street) there are buildings from the period of the station's construction. Some residences have been built recently at the station after Deutsche Bahn removed several sidings.

== Operations ==
Griesheim is on timetable (KBS) route 627 (Main-Lahn Railway). The regional and long distance traffic uses the parallel Taunus Railway (KBS 645.1), but, during disruptions on that line, traffic can be rerouted over the Griesheim route. The two lines separate west of Frankfurt station and rejoin east of Frankfurt Höchst station.

To the east of the passenger station is Griesheim depot, which was formerly operated by the Rhine-Main S-Bahn with a carriage shed, carriage washing facilities and workshops. With the transfer of this facility to the former post office station (Postbahnhof) near Frankfurt Galluswarte station, Griesheim depot is now used for the maintenance of ICE 3M and ICE T sets.

The line is now controlled from the Frankfurt signalling centre. The old Griesheim pushbutton signal box on platform 1 is now used as an operations room.

== Renovations ==
The second and third plattform are being renovated, for that reason the S1 and S2 only stop at the first plattform when going torwards Frankfurt, while in the opposite direction the train does not stop at Griesheim. The Station is temporarily being served by an Bus.
