= Frankfurt Taunusanlage station =

Railway station in Frankfurt, Germany

Taunusanlage
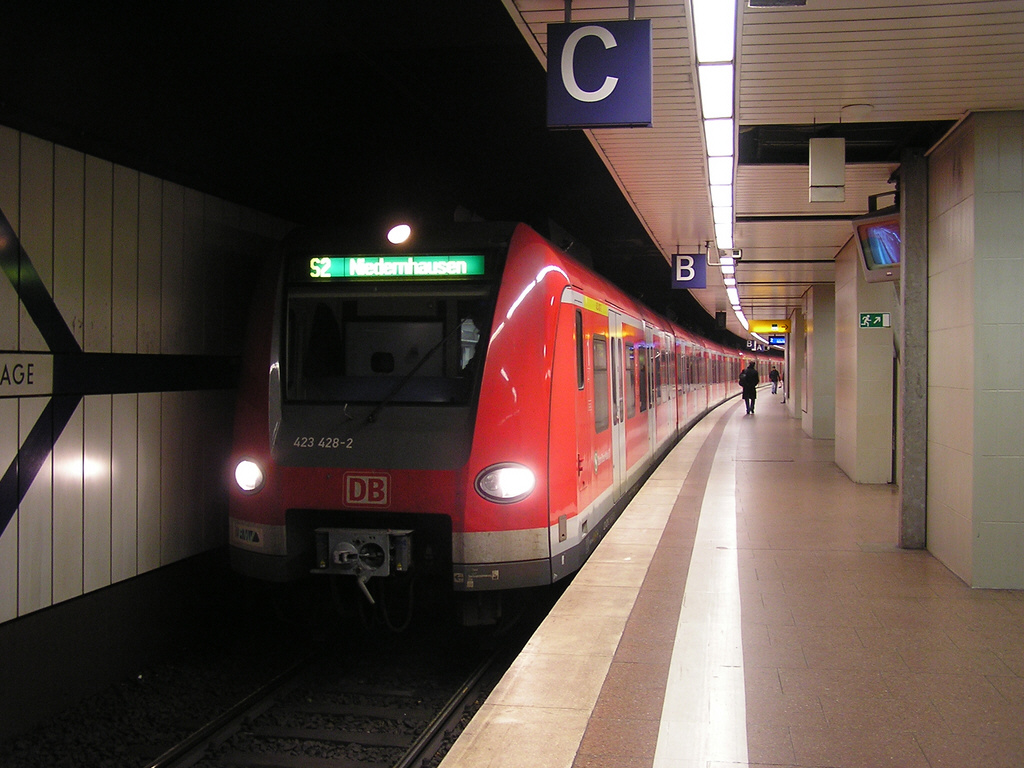
- S2 train at Taunusanlage station

General information
- Location: Taunusanlage 33, Frankfurt, Hesse; Germany
- Coordinates: 50°6′50″N 8°40′11″E
- Line: Frankfurt City Tunnel
- Platforms: 1
- Tracks: 2

Construction
- Accessible: Yes

Other information
- Station code: 1857
- DS100 code: FFTA
- IBNR: 8006691
- Category: 3
- Fare zone: : 5001
- Website: www.bahnhof.de

History
- Opened: 1978

Services
Preceding station	Rhine-Main S-Bahn	Following station
Frankfurt Hbf (tief) towards Wiesbaden Hbf	S1 (Rhine-Main S-Bahn)	Hauptwache towards Rödermark-Ober Roden
Frankfurt Hbf (tief) towards Niedernhausen	S2 (Rhine-Main S-Bahn)	Hauptwache towards Dietzenbach
Frankfurt Hbf (tief) towards Bad Soden	S3 (Rhine-Main S-Bahn)	Hauptwache towards Südbahnhof
Frankfurt Hbf (tief) towards Kronberg	S4 (Rhine-Main S-Bahn)	Hauptwache towards Südbahnhof
Frankfurt Hbf (tief) towards Friedrichsdorf	S5 (Rhine-Main S-Bahn)	Hauptwache towards Südbahnhof
Frankfurt Hbf (tief) towards Friedberg (Hess)	S6 (Rhine-Main S-Bahn)	Hauptwache towards Darmstadt Hbf
Frankfurt Hbf (tief) towards Wiesbaden Hbf	S8 (Rhine-Main S-Bahn)	Hauptwache towards Hanau Hbf
Frankfurt Hbf (tief) towards Wiesbaden Hbf	S9 (Rhine-Main S-Bahn)	Hauptwache towards Hanau Hbf
Location
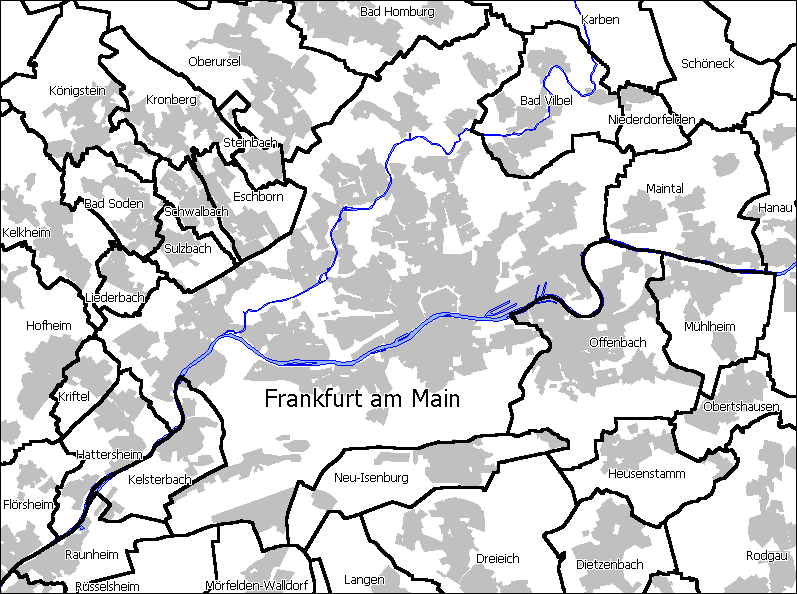
- Location within Frankfurt am Main Location within Hesse Location within Germany Location within Europe

Frankfurt (Main) Taunusanlage station (German: Bahnhof Frankfurt (Main) Taunusanlage) is a train station in the city centre of Frankfurt, Germany. It is served by eight S-Bahn lines (S1–S6, S8, S9).

The station was opened with the first section of the Frankfurt City Tunnel in May 1978. It consists of two tracks, surrounding a central platform.

== Name ==
The name Taunusanlage refers to a section of the now demolished city walls, named in the 19th century after the nearby Taunusbahnhof (Taunus station) of the Taunus Railway.

== Location ==
Taunusanlage station is located in Frankfurt's Westend district, close to Taunusanlage Park and the Bankenviertel, Frankfurt's financial district. Its entrance escalators are next to the Deutsche Bank Twin Towers. The station is a major hub for commuters and is in the immediate vicinity of several major banks.
