= Frankfurt (Main) Hauptbahnhof (low level) =

Railway station level in Germany

Frankfurt am Main Hbf
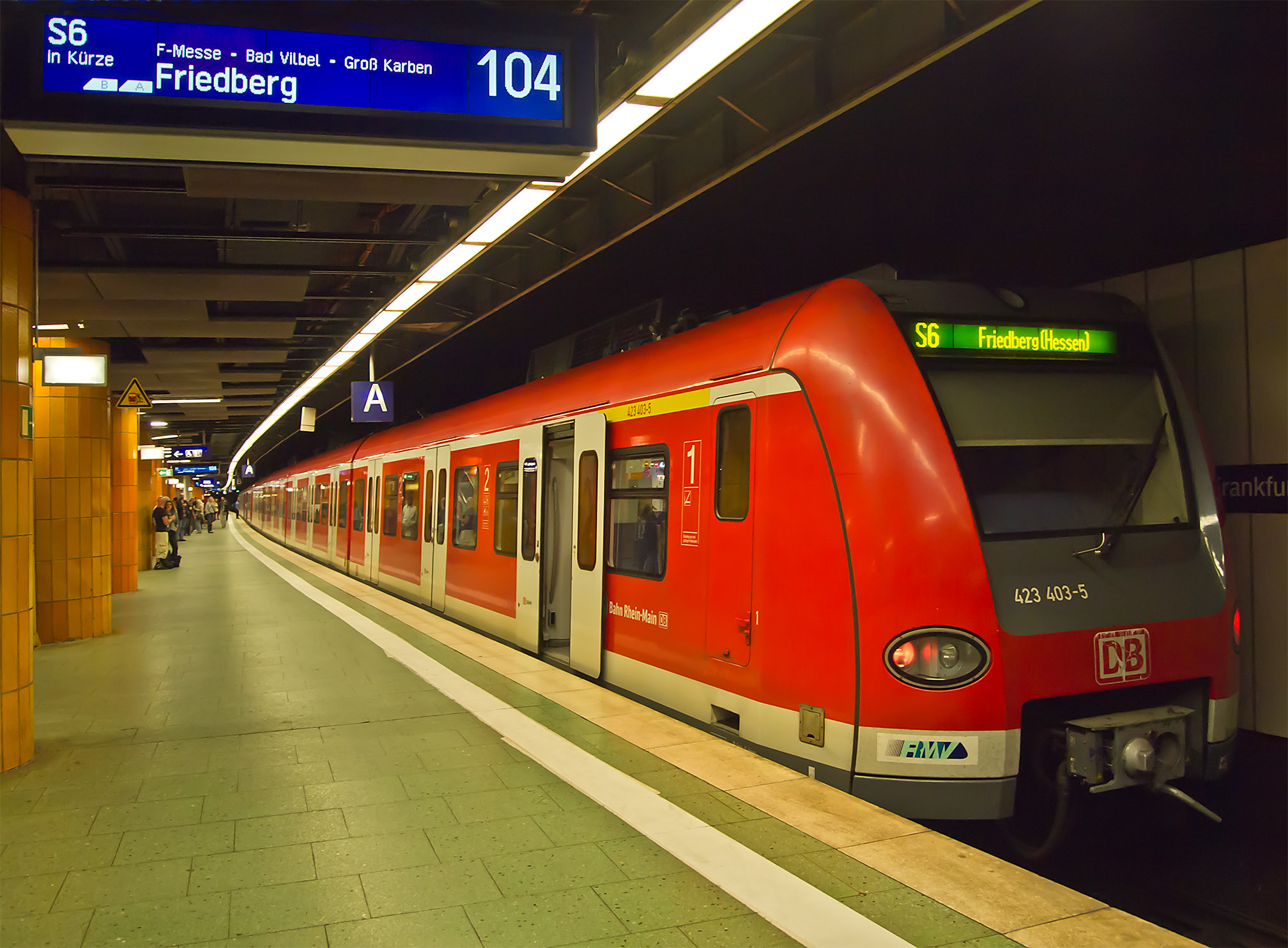
- S6 train to Friedberg in the underground station

General information
- Location: Im Hauptbahnhof, Frankfurt, Hesse; Germany
- Coordinates: 50°6′25″N 8°39′45″E
- Owner: Deutsche Bahn
- Operator: DB Netz; DB Station&Service
- Line: Frankfurt City Tunnel
- Platforms: 2 island platforms
- Tracks: 4
- Train operators: S-Bahn Rhein-Main

Construction
- Accessible: Yes

Other information
- Station code: 1866
- DS100 code: FFT
- IBNR: 8098105
- Category: 3
- Fare zone: : 5001
- Website: www.bahnhof.de

History
- Opened: 1978; 48 years ago

Services
Preceding station	Rhine-Main S-Bahn	Following station
Griesheim towards Wiesbaden Hbf	S1 (Rhine-Main S-Bahn)	Taunusanlage towards Rödermark-Ober Roden
Griesheim towards Niedernhausen	S2 (Rhine-Main S-Bahn)	Taunusanlage towards Dietzenbach
Galluswarte towards Bad Soden	S3 (Rhine-Main S-Bahn)	Taunusanlage towards Südbahnhof
Galluswarte towards Kronberg	S4 (Rhine-Main S-Bahn)	Taunusanlage towards Südbahnhof
Galluswarte towards Friedrichsdorf	S5 (Rhine-Main S-Bahn)	Taunusanlage towards Südbahnhof
Galluswarte towards Friedberg (Hess)	S6 (Rhine-Main S-Bahn)	Taunusanlage towards Darmstadt Hbf
Niederrad towards Wiesbaden Hbf	S8 (Rhine-Main S-Bahn)	Taunusanlage towards Hanau Hbf
Niederrad towards Wiesbaden Hbf	S9 (Rhine-Main S-Bahn)	Taunusanlage towards Hanau Hbf
Location
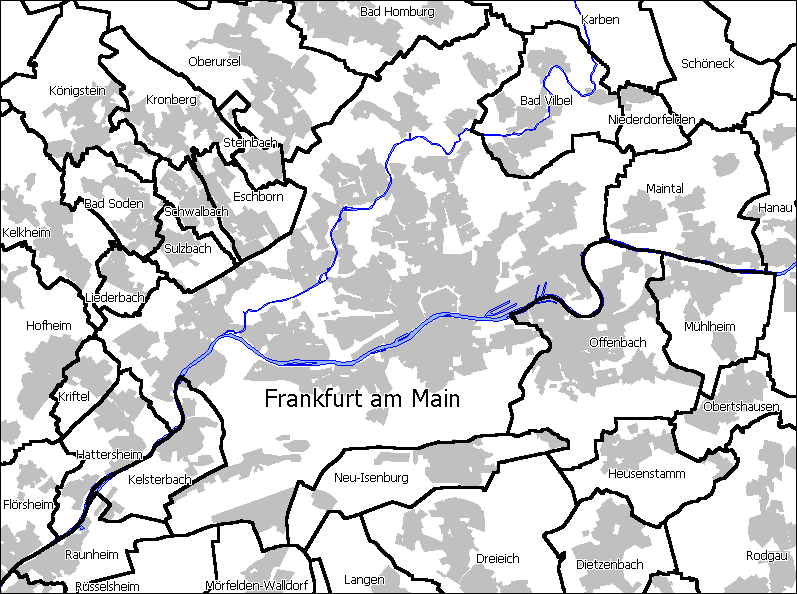
- Location within Frankfurt am Main Location within Hesse Location within Germany Location within Europe

Frankfurt (Main) Hauptbahnhof (low level) (German: Frankfurt (Main) Hauptbahnhof Tiefbahnhof, officially Frankfurt (Main) Hbf (tief)) is a four-track S-Bahn station below Frankfurt (Main) Hauptbahnhof and as such part of the busiest railway station in Frankfurt, Germany. It is also the busiest rapid transit station in Frankfurt.

The underground station forms together with Hauptwache station and Konstablerwache station the key nodes in the network of the Rhine-Main S-Bahn, a rail network that serves the Frankfurt/Rhine-Main region. It connects with the surface platforms of regional and long-distance services and also interchanges with the U-Bahn and trams.

== Station ==
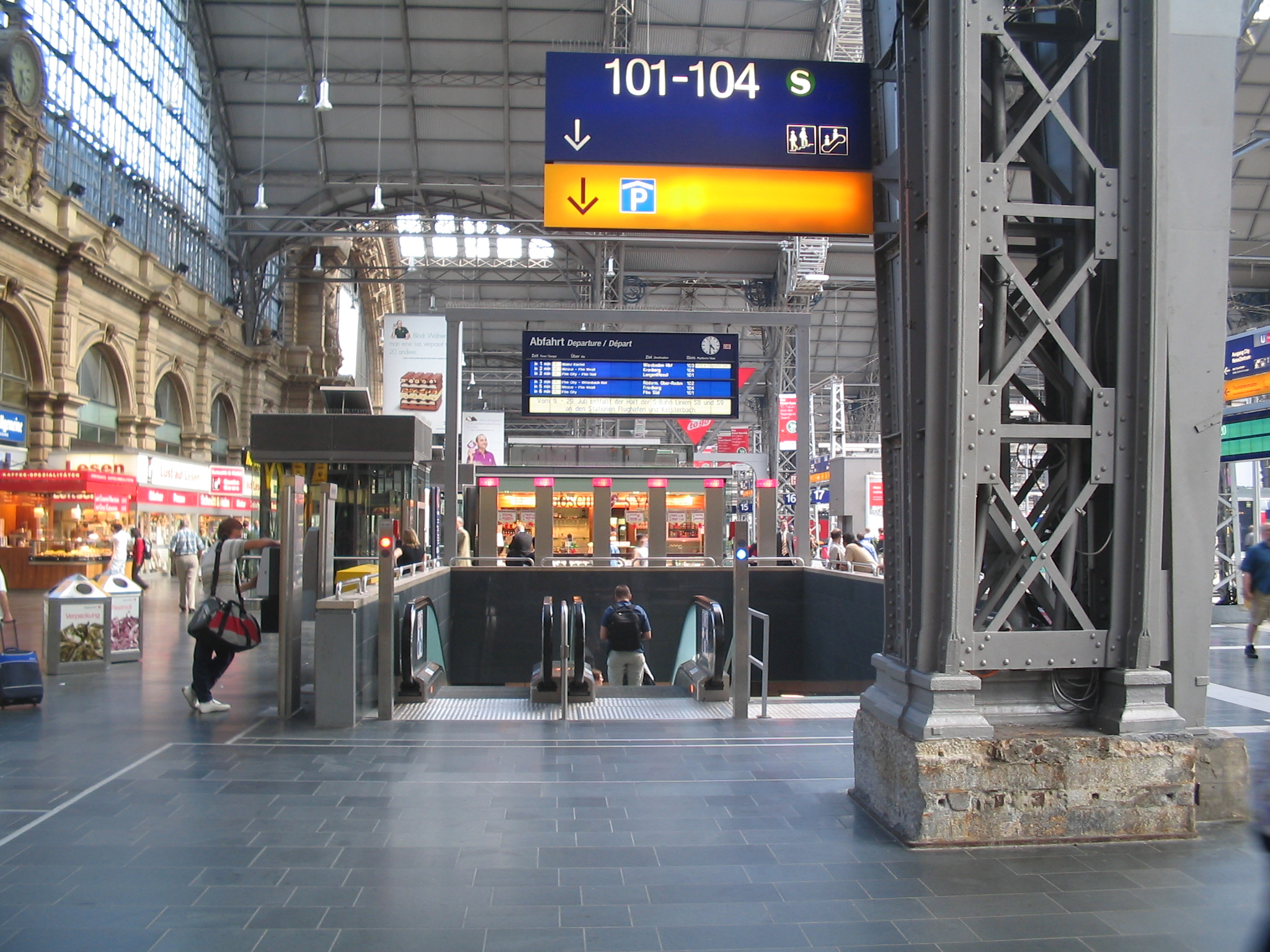
Entrance to the underground station in main station concourse

The underground station is located under the northern part of Frankfurt central station and its forecourt in the Gutleut district, west of central Frankfurt. The station is part of the City Tunnel line. Located above the S-Bahn station is the U-Bahn station, which was built at the same time. The station consists of two very wide and 210 m long island platforms.

== History ==
A line linking the western suburban lines through the city was first planned in the early 1960s. In 1962 the city of Frankfurt and the German Federal Railways approved plans for the line. Construction of the City Tunnel began in 1969 and construction of the Hauptbahnhof underground station commenced in 1971. The S-Bahn station, together with the underground station and a single-level shopping arcade was built in an excavation. The north wing of the station building was dismantled and its original stones were stored, so that the historical building could be rebuilt after the completion of the underground station.

After seven years of construction, the S-Bahn station, together with the first section of a City Tunnel to Hauptwache station was opened on 28 May 1978. On the same day, U-Bahn line B (over which lines U4 and U5 operate) was also extended to the central station.

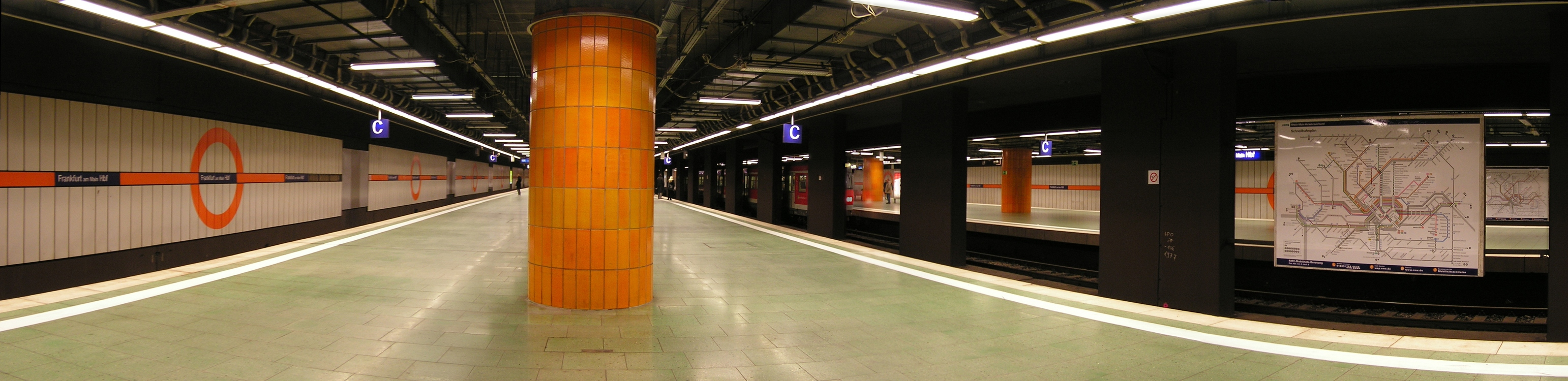
Underground station for S-Bahn
