= Niederhöchstadt station =

Railway station in Eschborn, Germany

Niederhöchstadt
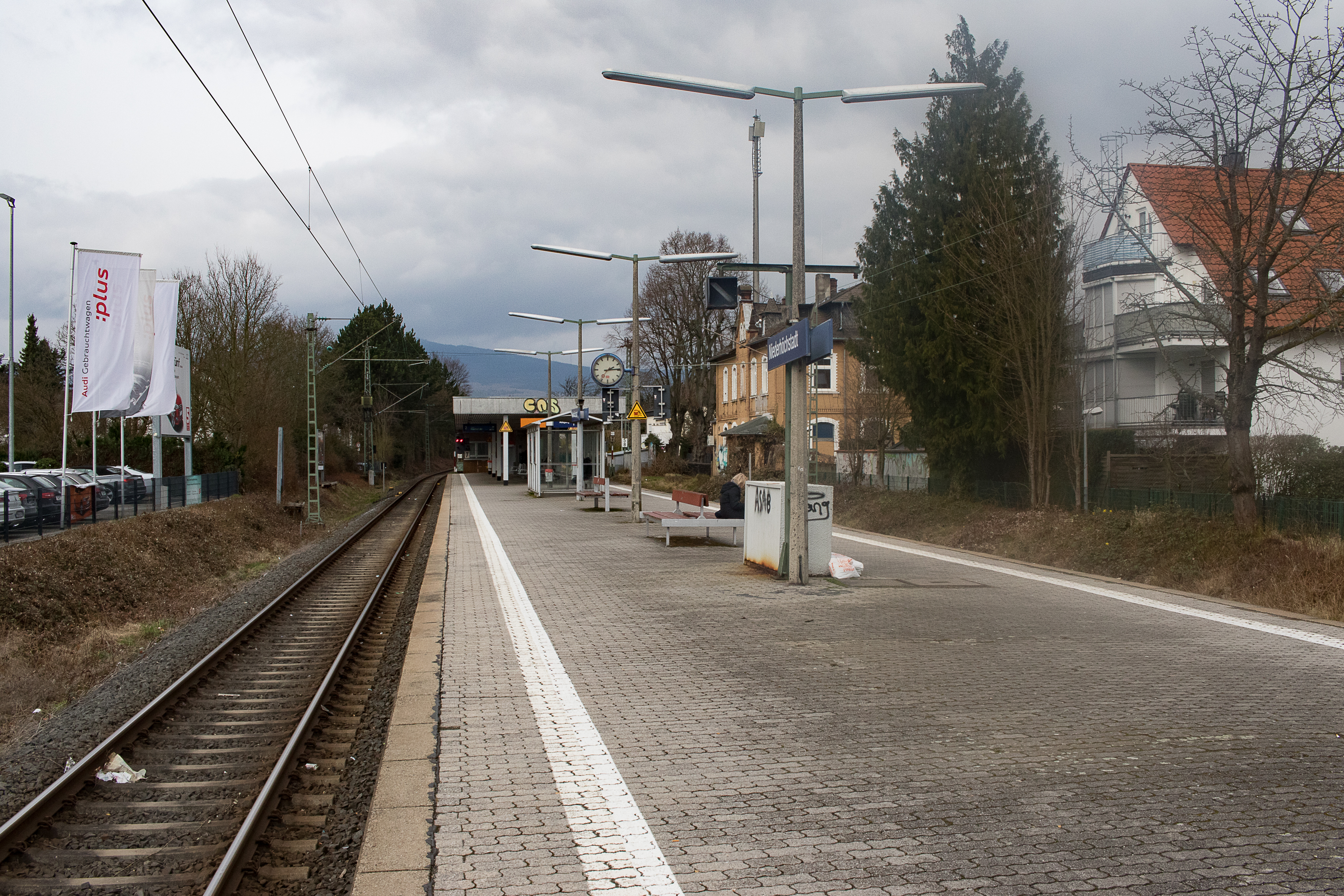
- 2018

General information
- Location: Eschborn, Hesse; Germany
- Coordinates: 50°09′14″N 8°32′51″E
- Owner: DB Netz
- Operator: DB Station&Service
- Lines: Limes Railway (5.8 km) (KBS 645.3); Kronberg Railway (0.0 km) (KBS 645.4)
- Platforms: 2

Construction
- Accessible: No

Other information
- Station code: 4500
- DS100 code: FNHS
- IBNR: 8004380
- Category: 5
- Fare zone: : 6655
- Website: www.bahnhof.de

History
- Opened: 1 November 1874

Services
Preceding station	Rhine-Main S-Bahn	Following station
Schwalbach Nord towards Bad Soden	S3 (Rhine-Main S-Bahn)	Eschborn towards Südbahnhof
Kronberg Süd towards Kronberg	S4 (Rhine-Main S-Bahn)	Eschborn towards Südbahnhof
Location
- Location within Hesse Location within Germany Location within Europe

Niederhöchstadt station is a junction station in the Niederhöchstadt district of the town of Eschborn in the German state of Hesse. The stations of Eschborn and Eschborn Süd are nearby. Just north-west of the station the Limes Railway to Bad Soden separates from the Kronberg Railway to Kronberg. The station is classified by Deutsche Bahn as a category 5 station.

== History ==
Niederhöchstadt station was opened by the Kronberg Railway Company (German: Cronberger Eisenbahn-Gesellschaft, using the old spelling of Kronberg) along with the line to Kronberg on 1 November 1874. The station building dates from the turn of the century in 1900 and is a heritage-listed building. It is a two-storey brick building with a shallow hipped roof with a small tented roof covered with dormers. The platform side of the building has a complex structure with a central projection covered by a gable, wall panels and cornices. A polygonal bay window was later added on the ground floor for supervisory personnel and an annex was built on the north side.

On 22 December 1970, the first section of the Limes railway was opened between Niederhöchstadt and the Schwalbach Limes station on the edge of Eschborn and opened as a shuttle service. Almost 2 years later, on 6 November 1972, the gap to Bad Soden was closed. Up to that time Bad Soden only had a rail connection via the Soden Railway to Frankfurt-Höchst, which is now operated as Rhein-Main-Verkehrsverbund line RB 13.

Since 28 May 1978, line S3 of the Rhine-Main S-Bahn has operated over the Limes Railway, and line S4 has operated over the Kronberg Railway, at first running only to Frankfurt Central Station. They were later extended to Langen (S4) and Darmstadt Central Station (S3) but from December 2024 both lines terminate at Frankfurt South.

== Services ==
The station is served by S-Bahn lines S3 and S4, running from Bad Soden (S3) and Kronberg (S4) to Frankfurt Central underground station and Frankfurt South.
