= Frankfurt Lokalbahnhof =

Railway station in Frankfurt, Germany

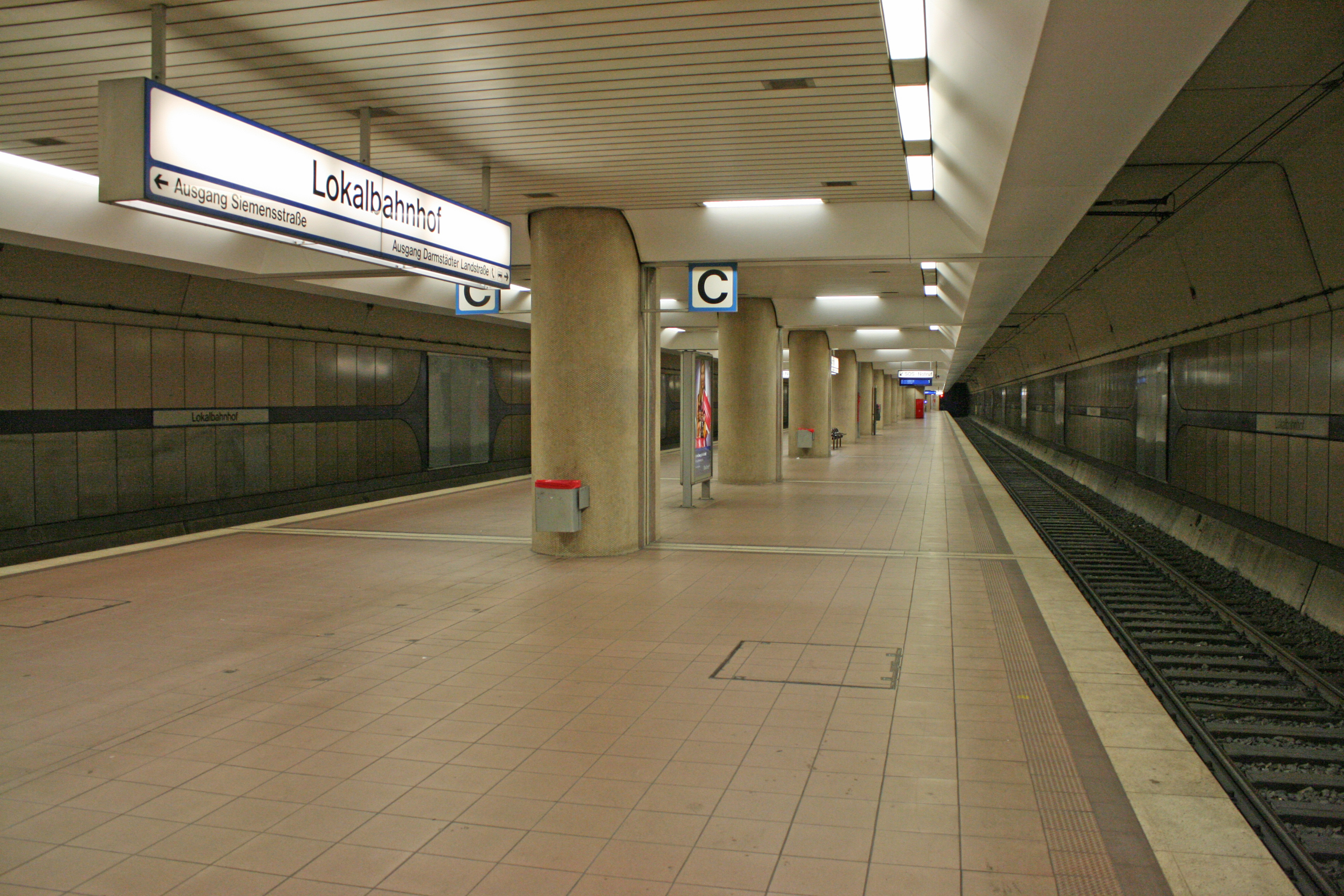

General information
- Location: Mühlbruchstraße 39, Frankfurt am Main, Hesse; Germany
- Coordinates: 50°6′11″N 8°41′32″E
- Owner: DB Netz
- Operator: DB Station&Service
- Line: City-Tunnel
- Platforms: 1 island platform
- Tracks: 2

Construction
- Accessible: No

Other information
- Station code: 1850
- DS100 code: FLBF
- IBNR: 8002038
- Category: 4
- Fare zone: : 5010
- Website: www.bahnhof.de

History
- Opened: 1990

Services
Preceding station	Rhine-Main S-Bahn	Following station
Ostendstraße towards Bad Soden	S3 (Rhine-Main S-Bahn)	Südbahnhof Terminus
Ostendstraße towards Kronberg	S4 (Rhine-Main S-Bahn)	Südbahnhof Terminus
Ostendstraße towards Friedrichsdorf	S5 (Rhine-Main S-Bahn)	Südbahnhof Terminus
Ostendstraße towards Friedberg (Hess)	S6 (Rhine-Main S-Bahn)	Südbahnhof towards Darmstadt Hbf
Location

Frankfurt Lokalbahnhof is an underground S-Bahn station in the district of Sachsenhausen of Frankfurt am Main, Germany. The station was opened when the City Tunnel was extended to Frankfurt South station in 1990. It consists of two tracks, surrounding a central platform.

The station is an important public transport interchange and is served by S-Bahn, tram and bus routes. The S-Bahn station is located underground, while the trams and buses run on the surface.

The station is named after the old Lokalbahnhof, the terminus of the former Frankfurt-Offenbach Local Railway (German: Frankfurt-Offenbacher Lokalbahn), which served the neighbourhood from 1848 until 1955, with breaks at the end of World War I and II. Its terminus in Frankfurt was called the Lokalbahnhof (literally: "Local Railway station").

In 1990, the S-Bahn station was built about 250 metres south of the site of the historic Lokalbahnhof and the modern Lokalbahnhof tram stop. It is on the City Tunnel S-Bahn line that runs south from central Frankfurt and continues southeast towards Frankfurt South station.

== Operations ==
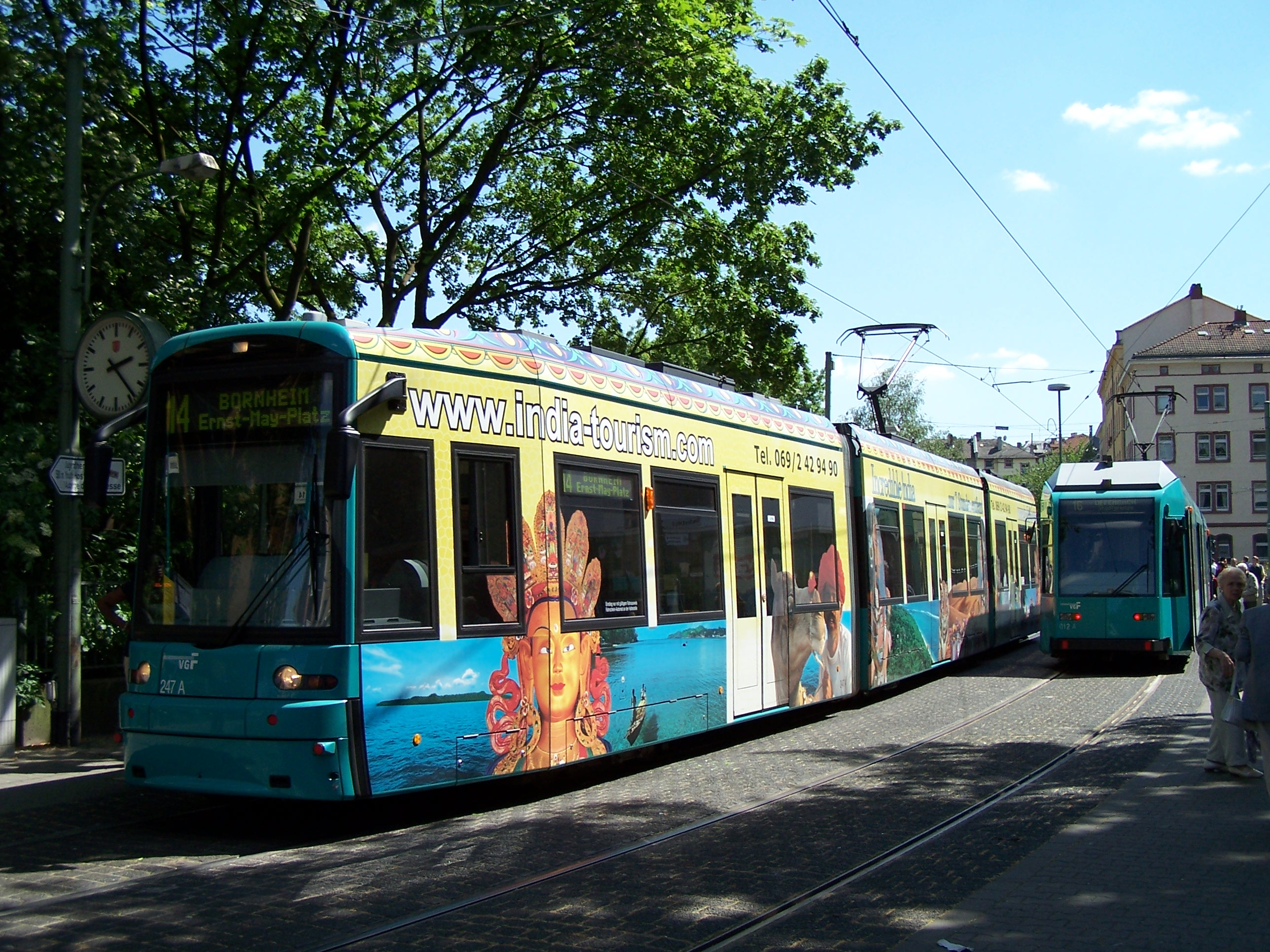
Lokalbahnhof tram stop

The following lines stop at the station:

- S-Bahn lines: S3, S4, S5 and S6,
- tram lines: 14, 15 and 16,
- bus routes: 36, 30, 45, 47, 653, OF-50.
