= Miriam Dahlke =

German politician

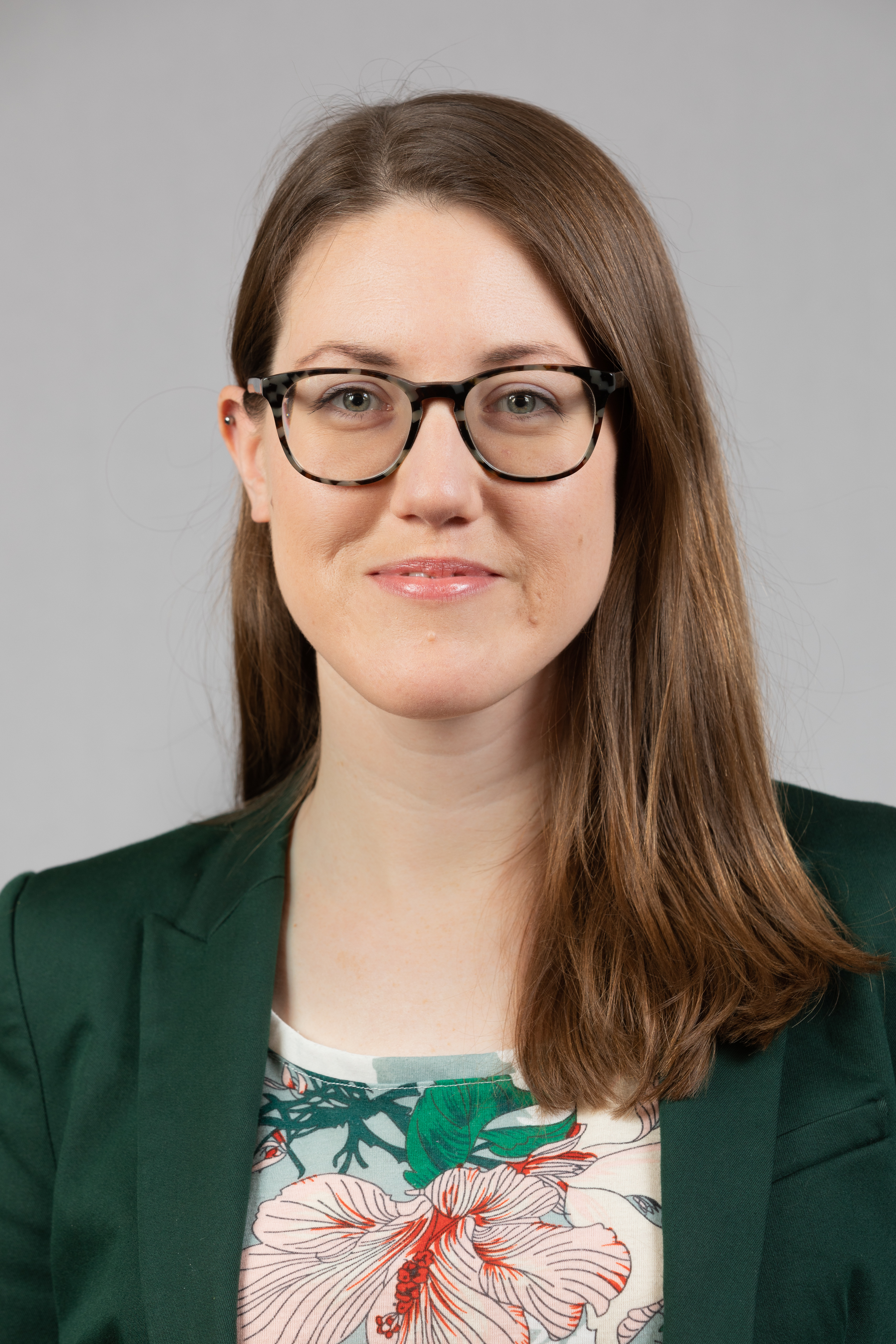
- Dahlke in 2019

Members of the Landtag of Hesse
- Incumbent
- Assumed office January 2019

Personal details
- Born: Miriam Dahlke; 1989 (age 36–37) Rödelheim, Germany
- Party: Alliance 90/The Greens

Miriam Dahlke (born 13 February 1989 in Frankfurt am Main) is a German politician (Alliance 90/The Greens). In the 2018 Hessian state election Dahlke won the electoral district mandate in Frankfurt am Main II.

== Life ==
Dahlke grew up in Rödelheim and finished her high school in 2008 at the Liebigschule in Frankfurt-Westhausen and subsequently completed a dual course of study in Business administration. In 2014, she completed her part-time master's degree in economics at the University of Hagen. From 2011 until her election to the state parliament in 2018, she worked as an employee of the German Agency for International Cooperation GmbH.

In 2012, Dahlke became a member of Alliance 90/The Greens. She ran in 2016 for the local elections in Hesse and was elected to the local council of Frankfurt's Mitte-West district. There, she took over the chairmanship of the Green Party.

In 2018, with the suggestion of Marcus Bocklet, she ran as candidate in the Frankfurt Main II district and surprisingly prevailed over her CDU and SPD competitors.

In 2021, Dahlke ran for chairwoman ("spokeswoman") of the Frankfurt Green Party. She lost in the first round of voting to Julia Frank.
