= Kronberg (Taunus) Süd station =

Railway station in Kronberg im Taunus, Germany

Kronberg (Taunus) Süd
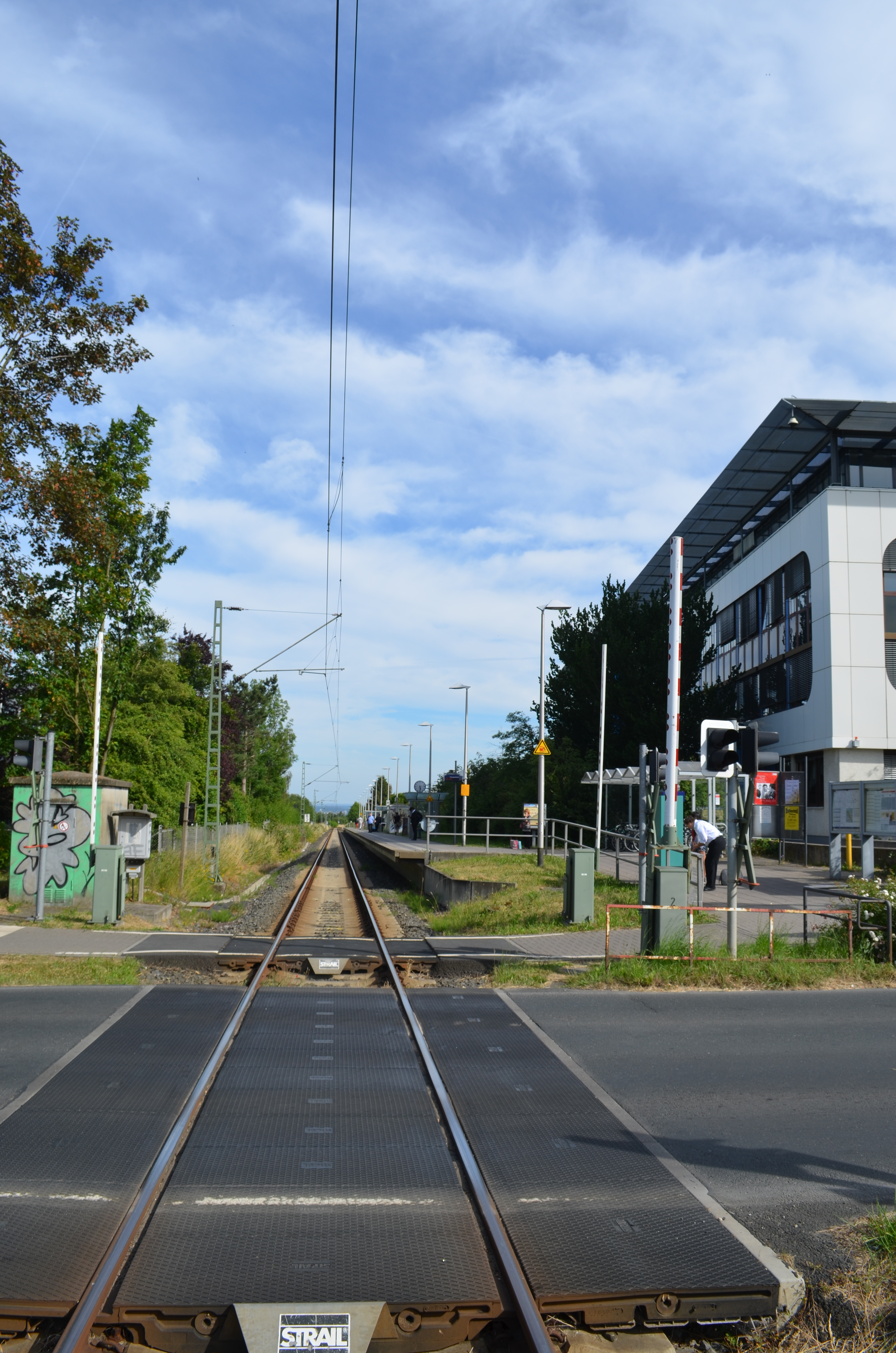
- 2014

General information
- Location: Am Schanzenfeld; 61476 Kronberg im Taunus; Hesse; Germany
- Coordinates: 50.1735°N 8.5287°E
- System: Hp
- Owner: DB Netz
- Operator: DB Station&Service
- Lines: Kronberg Railway (KBS 645.4)
- Platforms: 1 side platform
- Tracks: 1
- Train operators: S-Bahn Rhein-Main

Construction
- Parking: yes
- Cycle facilities: yes
- Accessible: yes

Other information
- Station code: 7986
- DS100 code: FKRS
- IBNR: 8087063
- Category: 6
- Fare zone: : 5171
- Website: www.bahnhof.de

Services
| Preceding station | Rhine-Main S-Bahn | Following station |
|---|---|---|
| Kronberg (Taunus) towards Kronberg | S4 (Rhine-Main S-Bahn) | Niederhöchstadt towards Südbahnhof |
Location
- Location within Hesse Location within Germany Location within Europe

Kronberg (Taunus) Süd station is a railway station in the municipality of Kronberg im Taunus, located in the Hochtaunuskreis in Hesse, Germany.
