= Limes Railway =

Railway line in Germany

Niederhöchstadt–Bad Soden
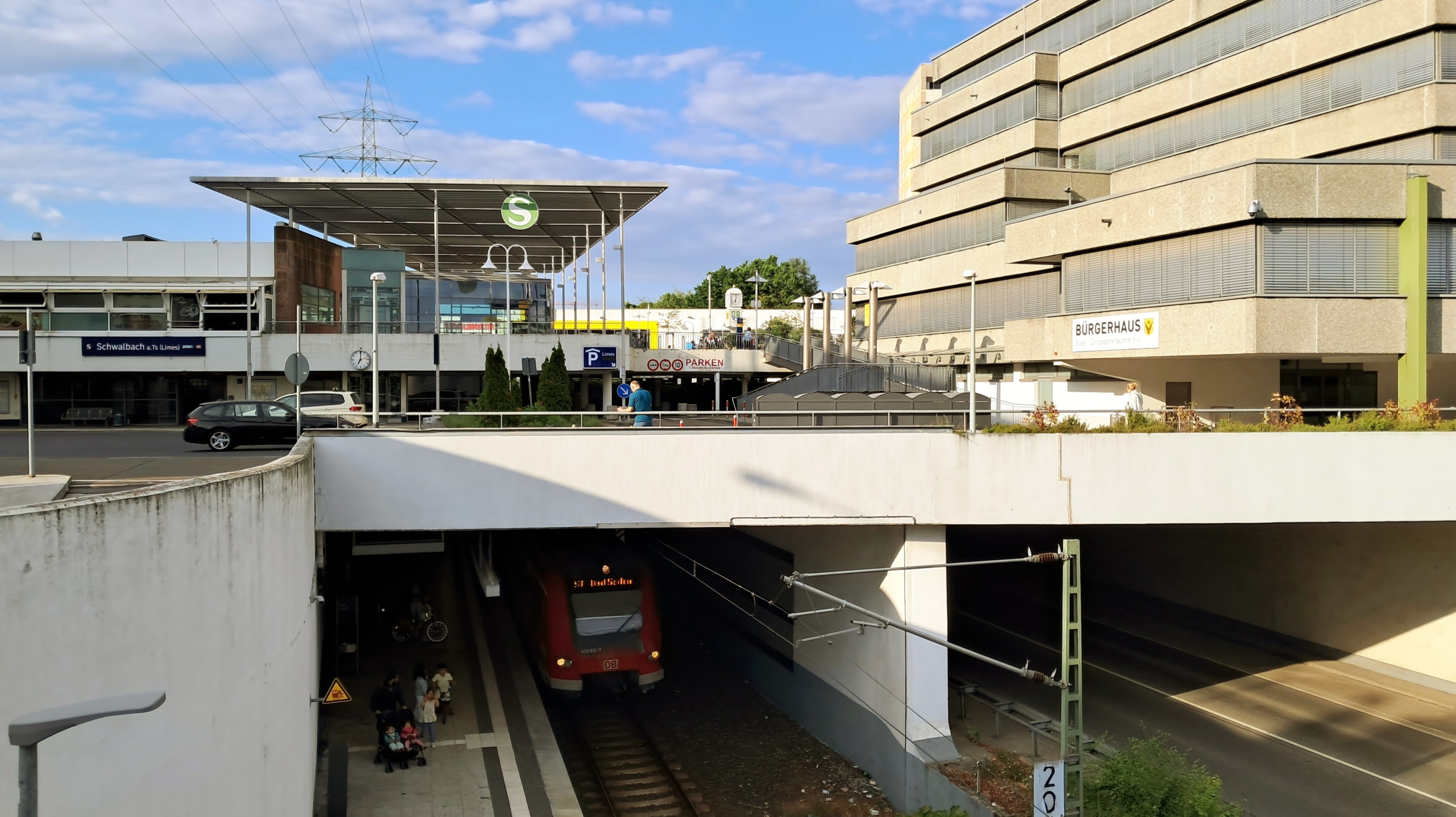
- S-Bahn tunnel Schwalbach am Taunus (Limes)

Overview
- Line number: 3641
- Locale: Hesse, Germany

Service
- Route number: 645.3

Technical
- Line length: 5.2 km (3.2 mi)
- Track gauge: 1,435 mm (4 ft 8 1/2 in) standard gauge
- Electrification: 15 kV/16.7 Hz AC overhead

The Limes Railway (German: Limesbahn) is a continuously electrified and single-track railway that runs on the southern edge of the Taunus in the German state of Hesse, connecting the towns of Niederhöchstadt and Bad Soden am Taunus. It is named after Limesstadt, 'Limes city', a housing development.

The line is only 5.2 kilometres long and is served by S-Bahn line S3, connecting Bad Soden station—which is a terminus also used by the Soden Railway—via Frankfurt (Main) Hauptbahnhof to Frankfurt South station.

== Past and Present ==
Beginning in 1964 a large greenfield housing development was built on the outskirts of Schwalbach am Taunus called Limesstadt, 'Limes city' (named after the Roman fortifications of the Limes Germanicus, which laid approximately 10 kilometres north of this site). It was considered that this development needed the kind of public transport access that could only be provided by rail. This idea was adopted by Georg Leber, the Federal Minister for Transport from 1966 to 1972 and the local member of the Bundestag. This led to the building of an electrified branch line to serve the area.

On 22 December 1970, a shuttle service opened between Niederhöchstadt station on the Kronberg Railway and the new Schwalbach Limes station. On 6 November 1972, the gap was closed to Bad Soden (Taunus) station, which until then was only connected by the Soden Railway to Frankfurt-Höchst.

On 28 May 1978 the line began to be used by S-Bahn line S3, initially to Hauptwache.

== Schwalbach North ==
DBAG Class 423 at station Schwalbach (North) in direction to Darmstadt

Since 31 October 2008, S3 services have served Schwalbach Nord station. This is located between the Schwalbach Limes and Niederhöchstadt stations and serves the industrial park Nord (Am Kronberger Hang) in Schwalbach am Taunus. The station consists of a 210-metre-long platform and is barrier-free.

The estimated construction cost of the new station was €1.5 million and planning costs amounted to €300,000.
