= S4 (Rhine-Main S-Bahn) =

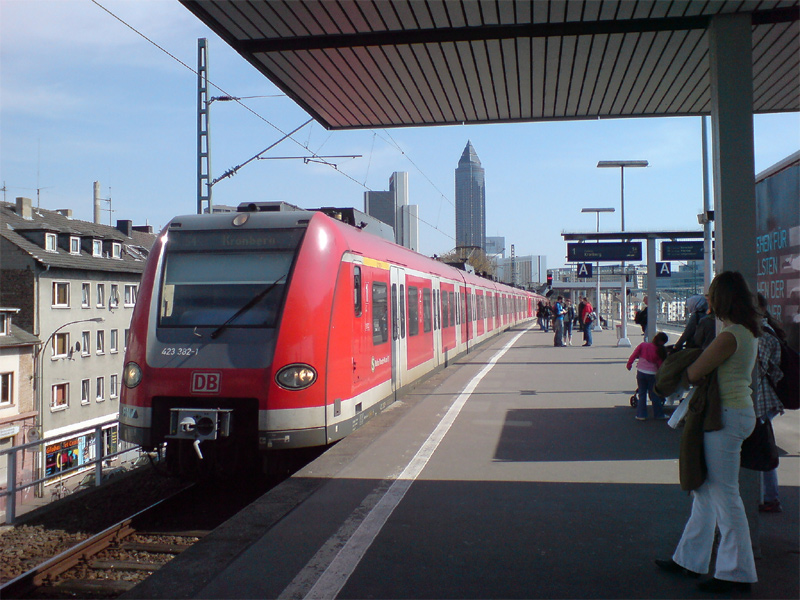
- S4 at Frankfurt West station, bound for Kronberg

Overview
- Status: Operational
- Owner: Rhein-Main-Verkehrsverbund
- Line number: 4
- Locale: Frankfurt Rhine-Main
- Termini: Kronberg; Frankfurt Süd
- Stations: 22

Service
- Type: Rapid transit, Commuter rail
- System: S-Bahn Rhein-Main
- Services: Kronberg Railway; Homburg Railway; Citytunnel Frankfurt; Frankfurt Schlachthof–Hanau railway
- Route number: 645.4
- Operator(s): DB Regio
- Depot(s): Frankfurt Hbf
- Rolling stock: DBAG Class 423, DBAG Class 430 (since March 2025)

History
- Opened: 28 May 1978

Technical
- Track gauge: 1,435 mm (4 ft 8 1/2 in) standard gauge
- Electrification: Overhead line

The S4 service of the S-Bahn Rhein-Main system bearing the KBS (German scheduled railway route) number 645.4

== Routes ==
=== City tunnel ===
The city tunnel is an underground, pure S-Bahn route used by almost all services (except for the S7 service which terminates at the central station). In a short section between Mühlberg and Offenbach-Kaiserlei the South Main railway is used.

== History ==
Year	Stations	Route
1974 (R4)	6	Kronberg – Frankfurt Hbf
1978	10 (+4)	Kronberg – Hauptwache
1983	11 (+1)	Kronberg – Konstablerwache
1990	14 (+3)	Kronberg – Frankfurt Süd
1997	19 (+5)	Kronberg – Langen
1999	21 (+2)	Kronberg – Langen
2002	22 (+1)	Kronberg – Langen
2024	16 (-6)	Kronberg – Frankfurt Süd

The S4 was one of the first six services of the Rhine-Main S-Bahn system. In a prior test operation it ran between Kronberg and Frankfurt Central Station. The service was then called R4 where the letter "R" stands for regional. After the opening of the Frankfurt Citytunnel the service was renamed to S4 and extended to the new Hauptwache underground station. Further extensions of the tunnel followed in 1983 (Konstablerwache) and 1990 (Ostendstraße and Lokalbahnhof) so that the Südbahnhof (South station) became the service's souther terminal.

From 1997 until 2024 the S4 rode from Kronberg to Langen.

== Operation ==
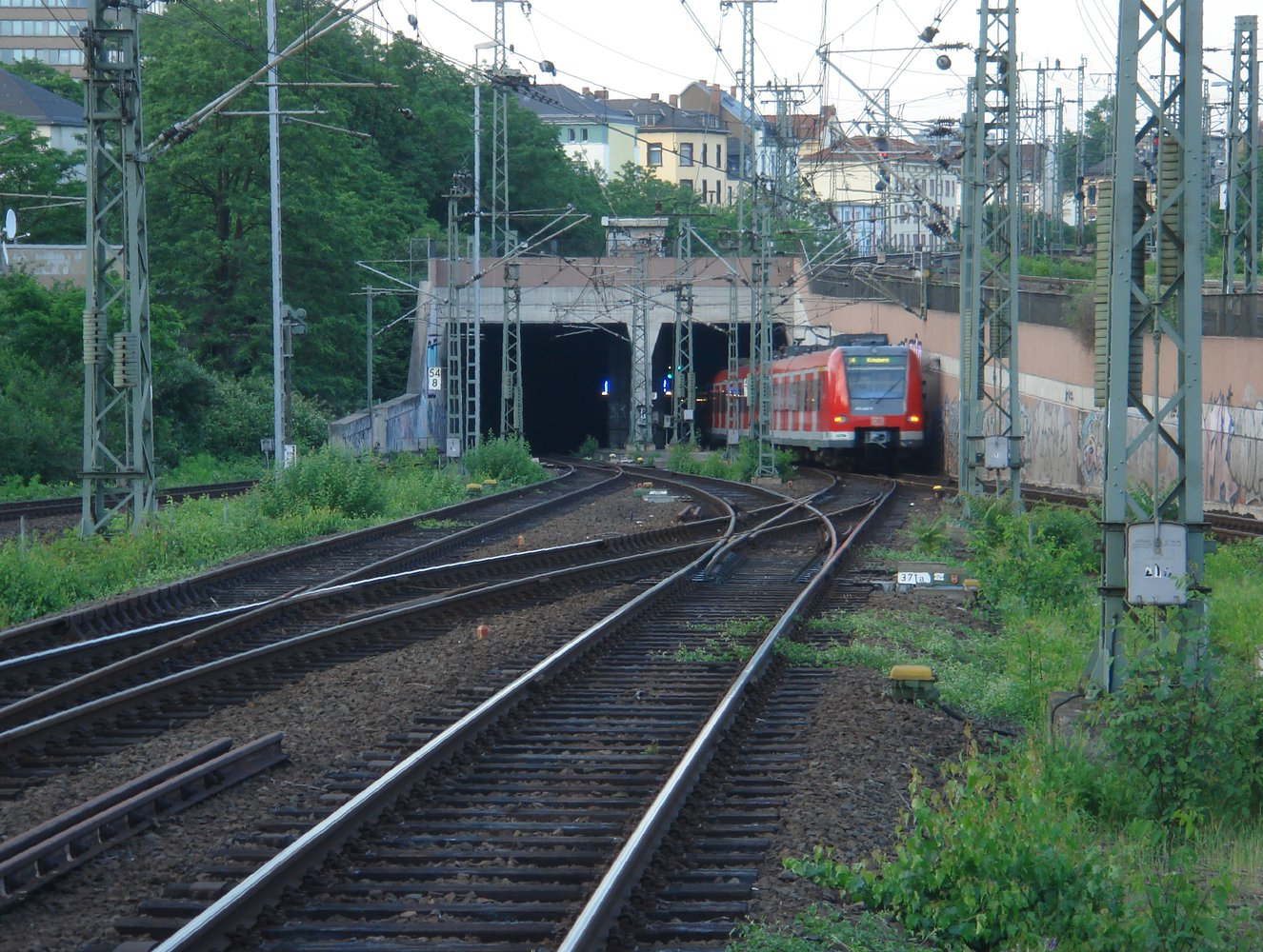
S4 entering the Frankfurt Citytunnel

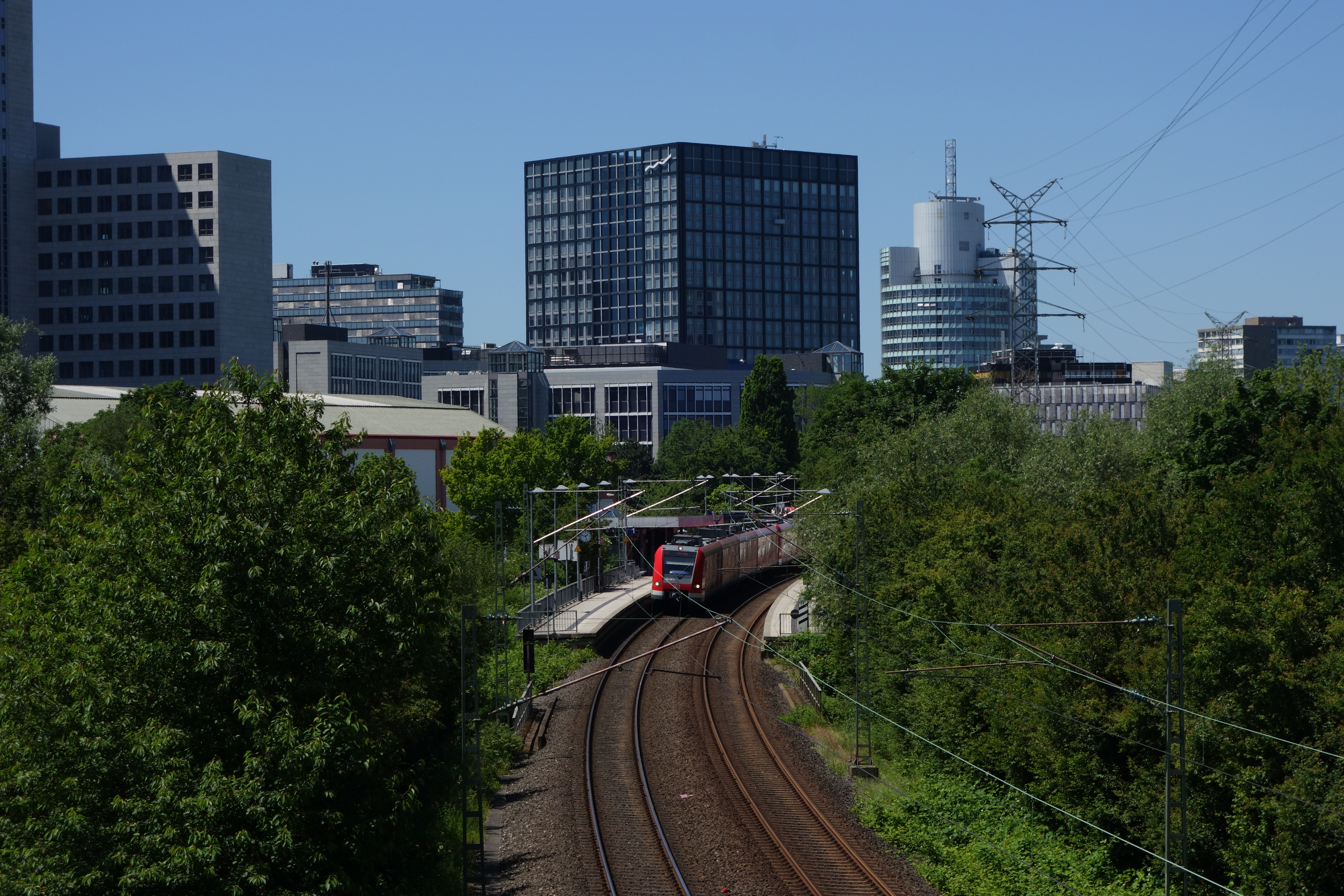
S-train station Eschborn-Süd with DB class 423 as S 4, heading for Langen. (Above the new building of Deutsche Börse called The Cube)

S4 (Rhine-Main S-Bahn)	Journey time		Station	Transfer	S-Bahn service since
=== Main-Taunus-Kreis ===
	0		Kronberg		1978
	2	+2	Kronberg Süd		1999
	5	+3	Eschborn-Niederhöchstadt	S3 (Rhine-Main S-Bahn)	1978
	7	+2	Eschborn	S3 (Rhine-Main S-Bahn)	1978
	9	+2	Eschborn-Süd	S3 (Rhine-Main S-Bahn)	1978
=== Frankfurt am Main ===
	12	+3	Frankfurt-Rödelheim	S3 (Rhine-Main S-Bahn) S5 (Rhine-Main S-Bahn)	1978
	16	+4	Frankfurt West	S3 (Rhine-Main S-Bahn) S5 (Rhine-Main S-Bahn) S6 (Rhine-Main S-Bahn)	1978
	18	+2	Frankfurt Messe	S3 (Rhine-Main S-Bahn) S5 (Rhine-Main S-Bahn) S6 (Rhine-Main S-Bahn)	1999
	20	+2	Frankfurt Galluswarte	S3 (Rhine-Main S-Bahn) S5 (Rhine-Main S-Bahn) S6 (Rhine-Main S-Bahn)	1978
	23	+3	Frankfurt Hbf (tief)	U4 U5	1978
	25	+2	Taunusanlage	S1 (Rhine-Main S-Bahn) S2 (Rhine-Main S-Bahn) S3 (Rhine-Main S-Bahn) S5 (Rhine-Main S-Bahn) S6 (Rhine-Main S-Bahn) S8 (Rhine-Main S-Bahn) S9 (Rhine-Main S-Bahn)	1978
	27	+2	Hauptwache	U1 U2 U3 U6 U7 U8	1978
	28	+1	Konstablerwache	U4 U5 U6 U7	1983
	30	+2	Ostendstraße	S1 (Rhine-Main S-Bahn) S2 (Rhine-Main S-Bahn) S3 (Rhine-Main S-Bahn) S5 (Rhine-Main S-Bahn) S6 (Rhine-Main S-Bahn) S8 (Rhine-Main S-Bahn) S9 (Rhine-Main S-Bahn)	1990
	32	+2	Frankfurt Lokalbahnhof	S3 (Rhine-Main S-Bahn) S5 (Rhine-Main S-Bahn) S6 (Rhine-Main S-Bahn)	1990
	33	+1	Frankfurt South Station	U1 U2 U3 U8	1990
