= Aaron ben Mordecai of Rödelheim =

Aaron ben Mordecai HaLevi of Rödelheim was a German-Jewish translator, who flourished early in the eighteenth century.

Born in around 1695 in Rödelheim, Germany. In his early years, Rabbi Aaron studied in Frankfurt, where he translated the two Targums on Esther into Yiddish. With the first edition, bearing the title Mezah Aharon, being published in 1718.
