= Maximilian Leopold Langenschwarz =

- Born: Meyer Hoffmann; 23 March 1808; Rödelheim, Holy Roman Empire
- Died: after 1867
- Occupations: Author, performer, hydropathist
- Writing career
- Pen name: Langenschwarz-Rubini, N. Z. Charleswang, Jakob Zwangsohn, Karl Zwangsohn
- Language: German

Maximilian Leopold Langenschwarz (23 March 1808 – after 1867) was a German writer, performer, and hydropathist.

== Biography ==
Langenschwarz was born as Meyer Hoffmann into a poor Jewish family in Rödelheim. Wealthy local residents financed his education at the gymnasia in Darmstadt and Frankfurt.

He later joined several travelling theatrical troupes. In 1828, while in Vienna, he converted to Catholicism and adopted the name Langenschwarz. In 1830, he appeared in Munich, where he gained recognition as a declaimer and improvisational performer. He also toured England, France, and the Russian Empire.

In 1842, he settled in Paris and worked as a hydropathist under the name Langenschwarz-Rubini. He returned to Germany in 1848, and later emigrated to the United States.

== Selected publications ==
- Arnoldo. Vienna. 1829.
- Die Fahrt in's Innere. Vienna, 1830.
- Der Hofnarre. 1832. A collection of poetry.
- Schneider Kitz. Das Buch des Jahrhunderts. 1842. A novel in four volumes.

He also edited the periodical Satirische Brille für Alle Nasen (1830).
