= Eschborn =

- Town
- Coat of arms

- Location of Eschborn within Main-Taunus-Kreis district
- Interactive map of Eschborn
- Location within Germany Location within Hesse
- Coordinates: 50°08′37″N 08°34′12″E
- Country: Germany
- State: Hesse
- Admin. region: Darmstadt
- District: Main-Taunus-Kreis

Government
  - Mayor (2019–25): Adnan Shaikh (CDU)

Area
  - Total: 12.13 km^{2} (4.68 sq mi)
- Elevation: 138 m (453 ft)

Population (2025-12-31)
  - Total: 22,478
  - Density: 1,853/km^{2} (4,799/sq mi)
- Time zone: UTC+01:00 (CET)
  - Summer (DST): UTC+02:00 (CEST)
- Postal codes: 65760
- Dialling codes: 06196, 06173
- Vehicle registration: MTK
- Website: www.eschborn.de

Eschborn (German pronunciation: [ˈɛʃbɔʁn]) is a town in the Main-Taunus district, Hesse, Germany. It is part of the Frankfurt Rhein-Main urban area and has a population of 21,488 (2018). Eschborn is home to numerous corporations due to its proximity to Frankfurt and relatively low business tax rate.

== Geography ==
=== Location ===
Most of "old" Eschborn is on the streets Hauptstraße, near the Eschborn S-Bahn station, and Unterortstraße, including the Rathaus (Town Hall) and some old churches. The village of Niederhöchstadt is part of Eschborn, but with a different phone area code (same as the adjacent community of Kronberg). Between Eschborn and the communities to the north and west incorporates greenery with housing and trail access to the foothills of the Taunus mountains. Eschborn is also near some popular supermarkets such as Globus, but there also some smaller shops like Nahkauf, and a frequented Ice Cream cafe.

=== Landscape ===
Eschborn provides direct views of the Taunus mountain ranges, especially the 'Altkönig' and behind it the 'Feldberg' up to elevations of around 880 m above sealevel. From Eschborn to the north, there are numerous hiking and biking trails leading up to these green mountain zones. In winter, along and up those hills, there are also several cross country skiing slopes and downhill sled runs used by large crowds of people, typically on weekends.

== History ==
Eschborn was first mentioned at the beginning of the reign of Charlemagne as king of the Franks. The reason for this first written mention of Eschborn, spelled 'Aschenbrunne', was a deed of donation (in the name of the martyr Nazarius) to the Benedictine Lorsch Abbey, which is about 60 km (37 mi) south of Eschborn.

The name Aschenbrunne means "well at the ash tree".

== Buildings and architecture ==
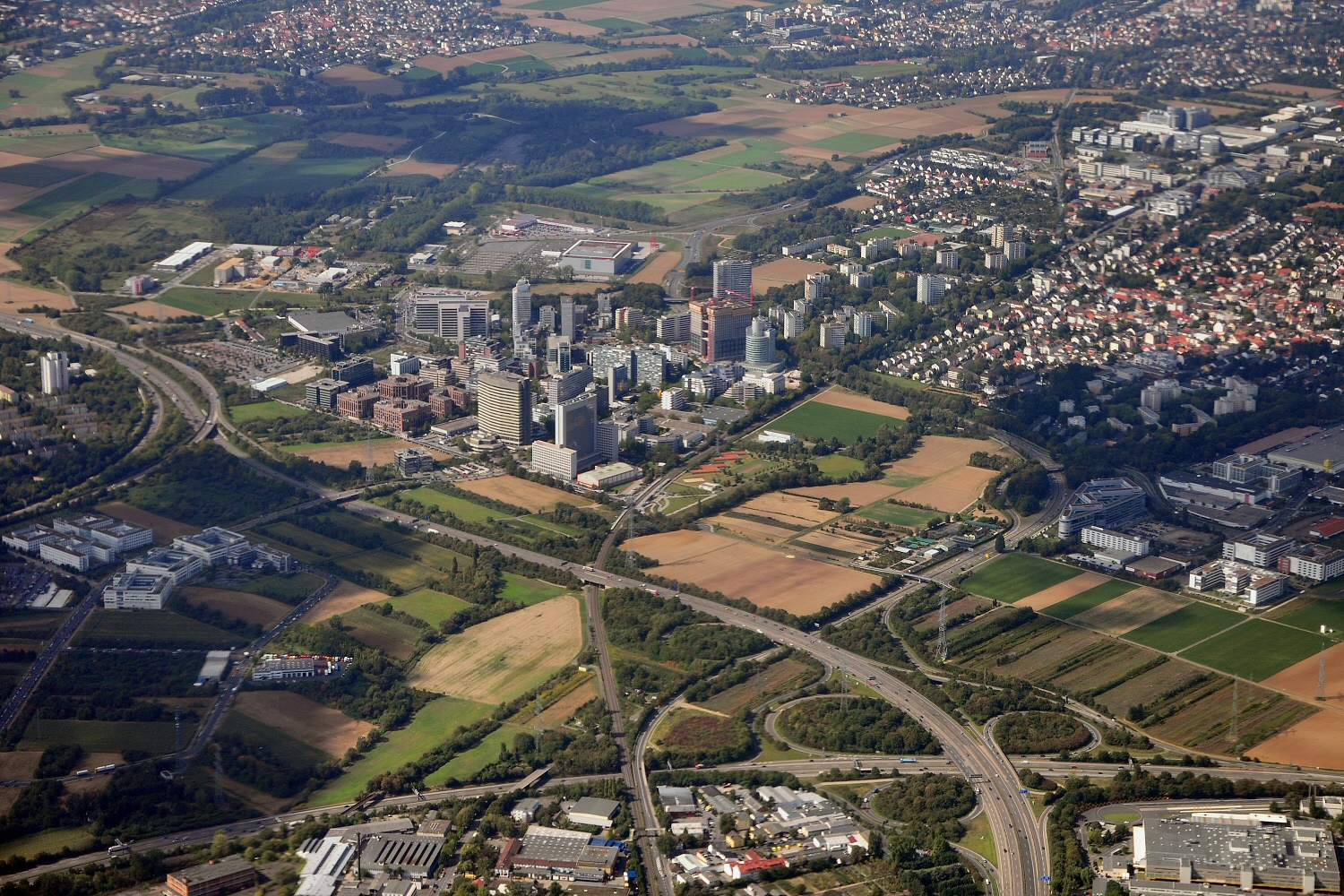
"Bürostadt Eschborn" office district of Eschborn seen from a Lufthansa B737

Large areas of the town are still undeveloped and green expanses fuse in with several high-rises, with a brook passing by the Rathaus (Town Hall) and running close to the S-Bahn railway line, that joins the river Nidda (which in turn is a tributary of the River Main that flows through Frankfurt am Main). Housing large corporations that have chosen Eschborn, the high-rises of Deutsche Bank, LG (formerly occupied by Vodafone (formerly Arcor)), Deutsche Telekom (T-Systems), Ernst & Young, Deutsche Börse Group (building named "The Cube") and newly SAP, are unmissable.

The street housing the Deutsche Bank offices is named Alfred-Herrhausen-Allee, after Alfred Herrhausen, former chairman of Deutsche Bank who was killed on 30. November 1989 by the RAF (Red Army Faction, the Baader-Meinhof Group) assailants near his home in Bad Homburg.

== Town partnerships ==
Eschborn is twinned with 4 towns in Europe:

- Montgeron, France since 1985
- Póvoa de Varzim, Portugal since 2010
- Żabbar, Malta since 2010
- Viernau, Germany

== Transport ==
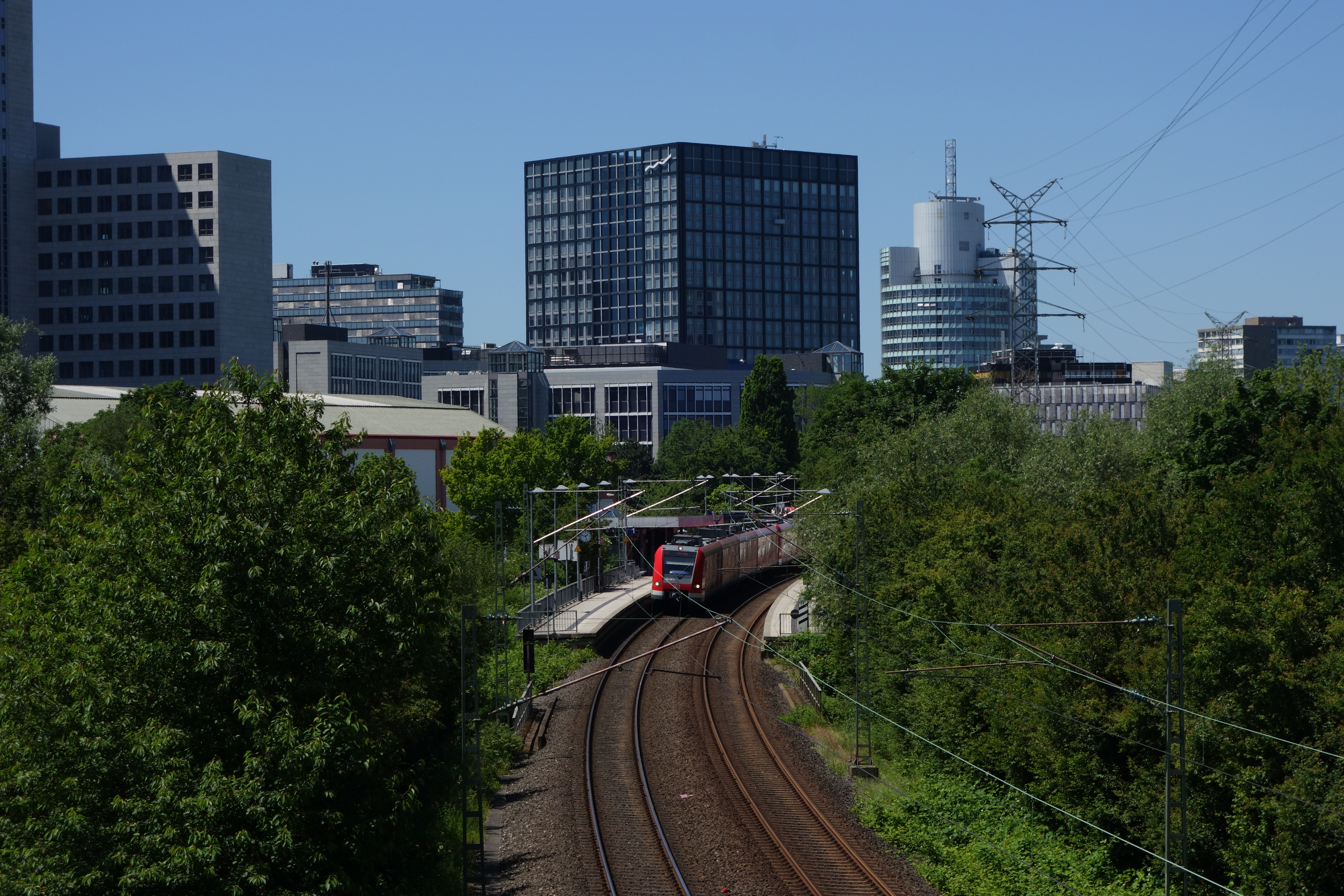
S-train station Eschborn Süd with DB class 423 as S4, heading for Langen (above the new building of Deutsche Börse called The Cube)

The S-Bahn train station Eschborn Süd (south) is the last stop on the route still considered within Zone 50, which covers Frankfurt (excluding suburbs), making it popular to employees who can commute using the same monthly pass. Two S-Bahn lines (S 3 and S4) operate to Eschborn. They both connect to Frankfurt Central Station and end at Frankfurt South station. Frankfurt Airport is located 15 km (9 mi) which is 15 minutes drive from the town.

== Education ==
Eschborn has 4 schools in total:

- Hartmutschule (Elementary)
- Süd-West-Schule (Elementary)
- Westerbach-Schule (Elementary), in Niederhöchstadt
- Heinrich-von-Kleist-Schule (High School)

== Economy and business ==
Following Government offices are located in Eschborn:

- Bundesamt für Wirtschaft und Ausfuhrkontrolle (BAFA) - The Federal Office of Economics and Export Control
- Bundesnetzagentur (vormals RegTP; Außenstelle Hessen) - (The Federal Network Agency)
- Bundesrechnungshof - (Branch of the federal financial management)
- Deutsche Gesellschaft für Internationale Zusammenarbeit (GIZ) - English

Many common companies have headquarters or branches located in Eschborn. Other Companies with branches in Eschborn are: Deutsche Bank AG, Siemens SE, Deutsche Telekom AG, Ernst & Young, Continental AG, and Vodafone Germany.

Nissin Foods GmbH has its offices in Eschborn.

== Sport ==
The FC Eschborn football team was established in 1930. The chess club SC Eschborn 1974 was founded in 1974.

== Points of interest ==
- Arboretum Main-Taunus

== Notable people ==
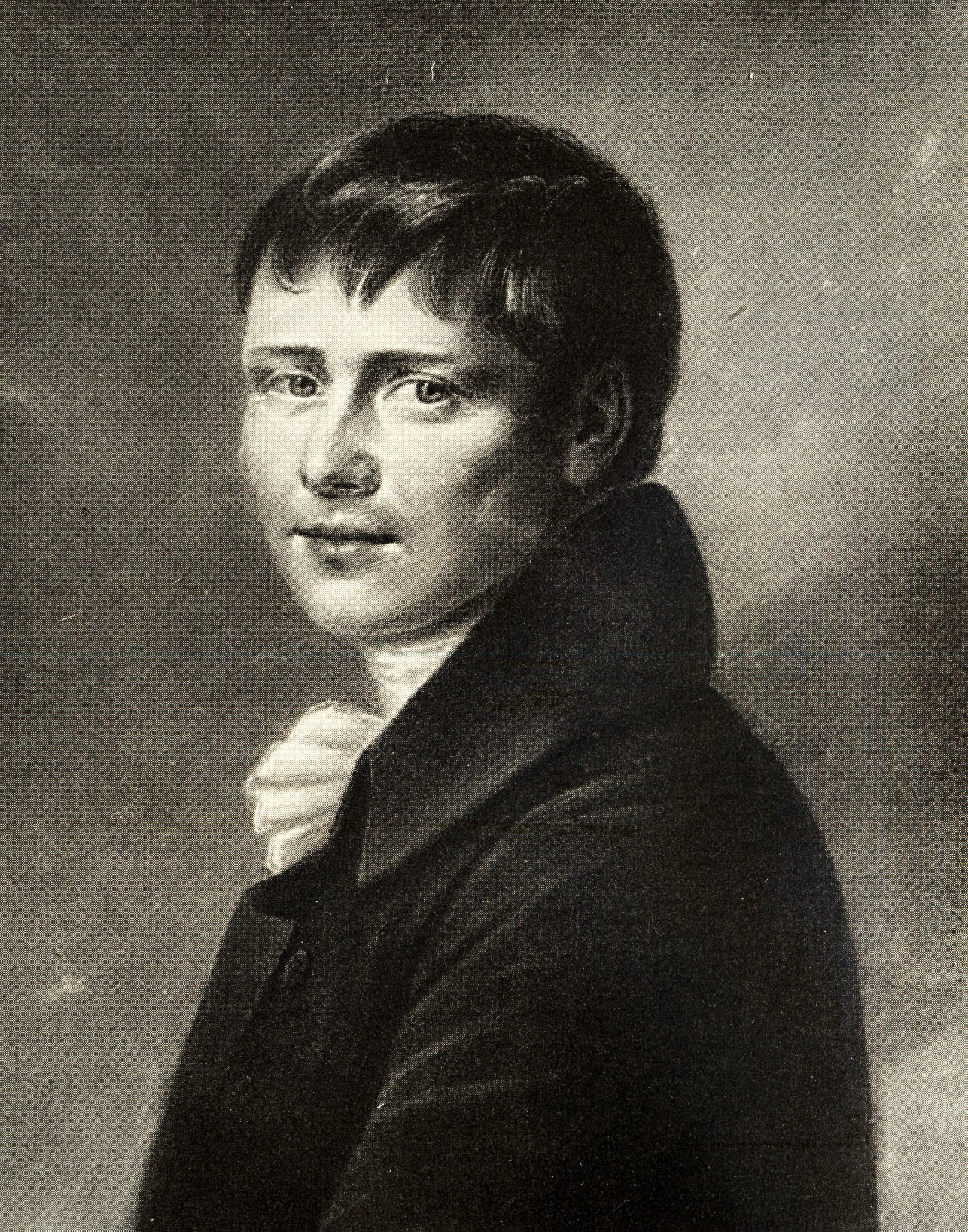
Heinrich von Kleist

- Heinrich von Kleist (1777–1811), was quartered on 25 February 1795 as a young lieutenant in Eschborn. He wrote two letters to his sister
- Karl-Heinz Koch (1924–2007), former Hessian minister of justice (CDU), father of Roland Koch
- Roland Koch (born 1958), politician, former Hessian prime minister (CDU), grew up in Eschborn and still lives there today
