= Kronberg (Taunus) station =

Railway station in Germany

Kronberg (Taunus) Kronberg
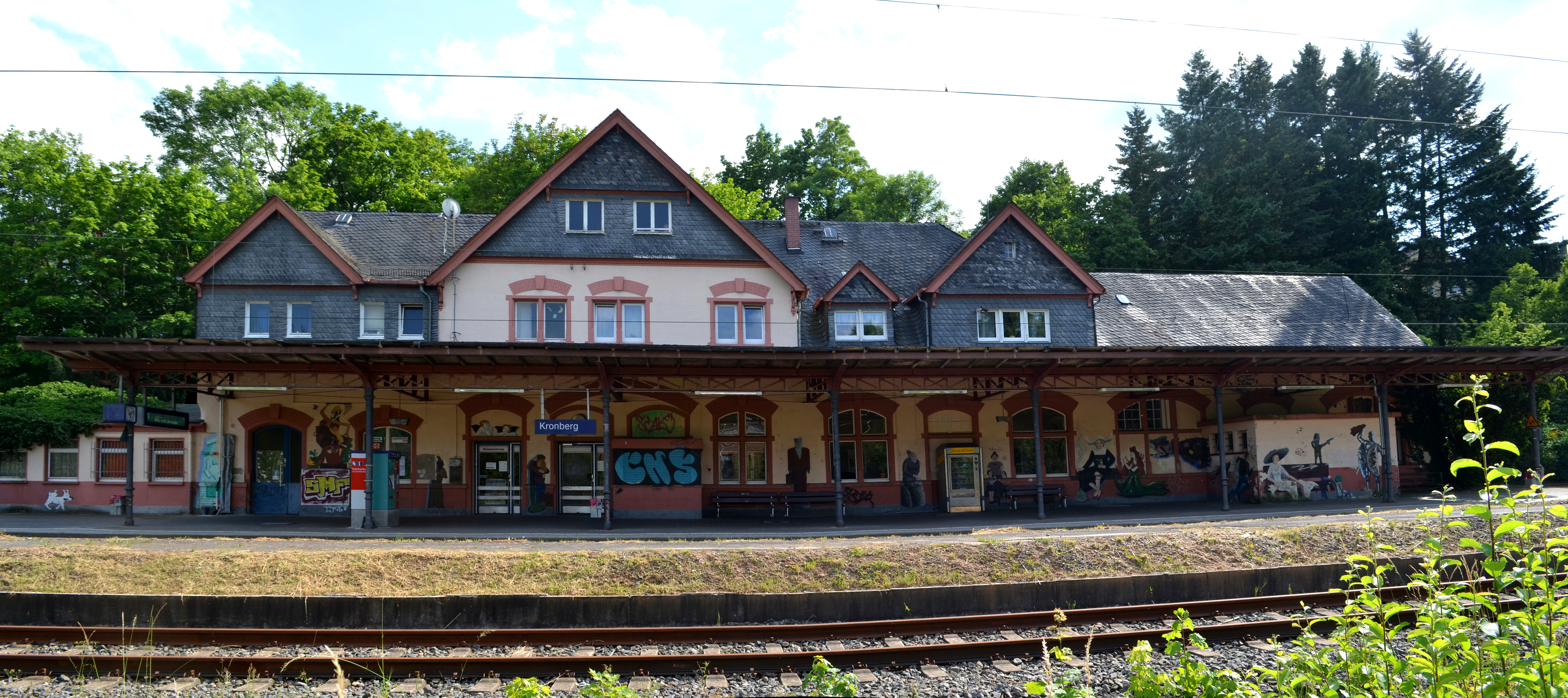
- 2014

General information
- Location: Bahnhofstraße 36; 61476 Kronberg im Taunus; Hesse; Germany
- Coordinates: 50.1800°N 8.5162°E
- System: Bf
- Owner: DB Netz
- Operator: DB Station&Service
- Lines: Kronberg Railway (KBS 645.4)
- Platforms: 2 side platforms
- Tracks: 2
- Train operators: S-Bahn Rhein-Main

Other information
- Station code: 3428
- DS100 code: FKRO
- IBNR: 8003447
- Category: 5
- Fare zone: : 5144
- Website: www.bahnhof.de

History
- Opened: 1 November 1875; 150 years ago

Services
Preceding station	Rhine-Main S-Bahn	Following station
Terminus	S4 (Rhine-Main S-Bahn)	Kronberg (Taunus) Süd towards Südbahnhof
Location
- Location within Hesse Location within Germany Location within Europe

Kronberg (Taunus) station is a railway station in Kronberg im Taunus, located in the Hochtaunuskreis, Hesse, Germany. It is served by line S4 of the Rhine-Main S-Bahn.
