= Bad Soden (Taunus) station =

Railway station in Bad Soden, Germany

Bad Soden (Taunus)
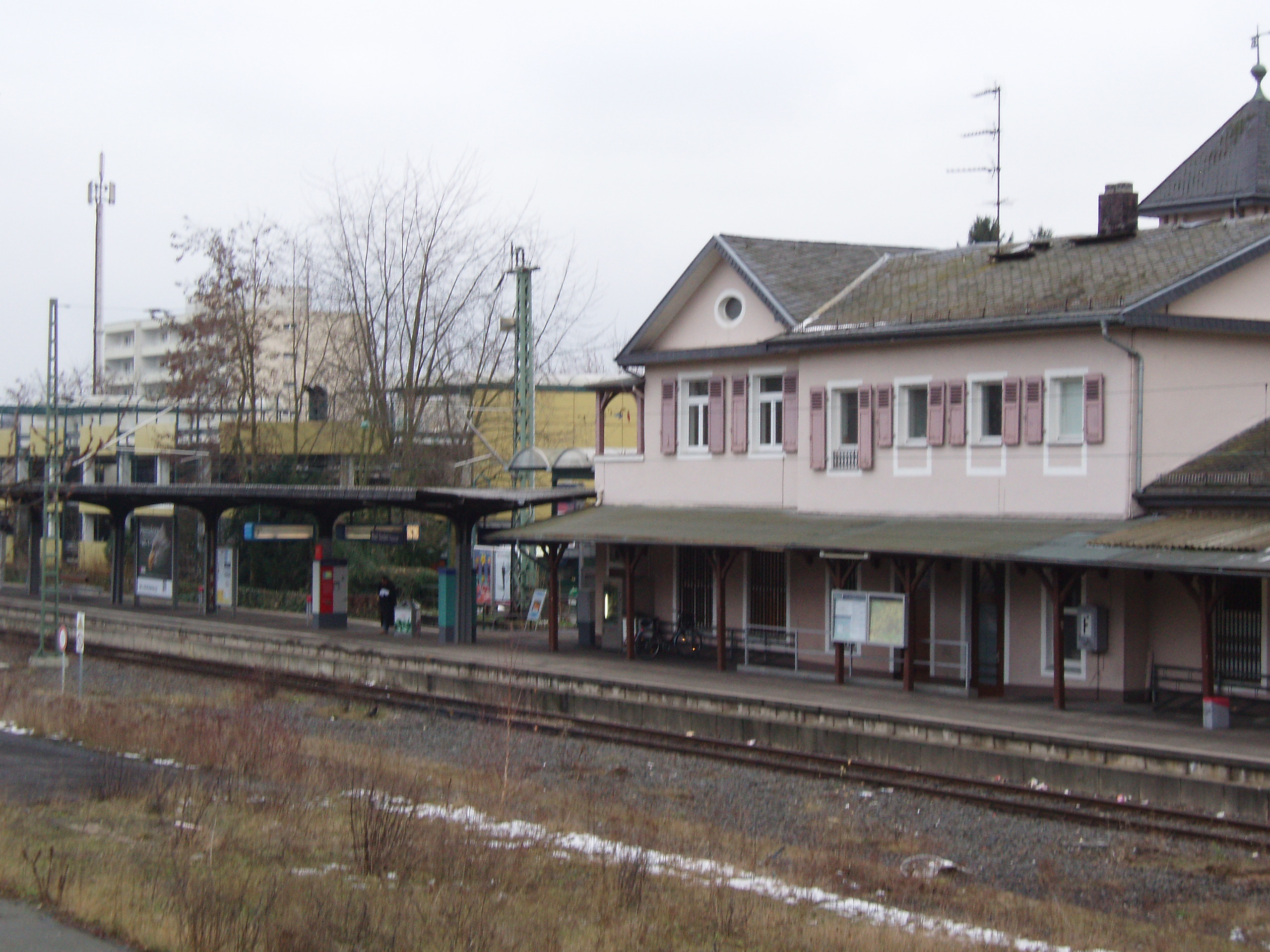

General information
- Location: Am Bahnhof 3, Bad Soden am Taunus, Hesse; Germany
- Coordinates: 50°8′36″N 8°30′12″E
- Lines: Soden Railway (KBS 643); Limes Railway (KBS 645.3)
- Platforms: 5
- Train operators: Regionalverkehre Start Deutschland; S-Bahn Rhein-Main

Construction
- Accessible: Yes

Other information
- Station code: 346
- DS100 code: FBSO
- IBNR: 8000752
- Category: 5
- Fare zone: : 6637
- Website: www.bahnhof.de

History
- Opened: 1847

Services
Preceding station	Start	Following station
Terminus	RB 11	Sulzbach Nord towards Höchst
Preceding station	Rhine-Main S-Bahn	Following station
Terminus	S3 (Rhine-Main S-Bahn)	Sulzbach (Taunus) towards Südbahnhof
Location

Bad Soden (Taunus) station is the northern terminus of the Soden Railway (German: Sodener Bahn) in the German state of Hesse. It is also the northern terminus of line S3 of the Rhine-Main S-Bahn over the Limes Railway (Limesbahn).

== Location and facilities ==
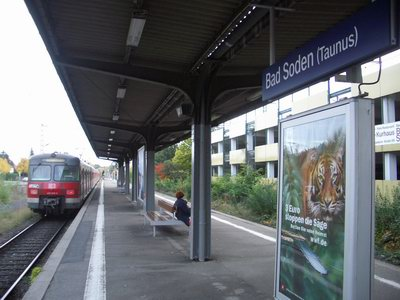
Platform with S3 service to Darmstadt Hbf

The station is located in the centre of Bad Soden. The entrance building was built in 1847 and the middle part of the building dates from this time. The southern gable of the northern wing and the attached sheds were added in the second decade of the last century. The entrance building is listed as a monument under the Hessian Heritage Act. Next to the platform, there was a long freight shed with its own sidings. These facilities have been removed in the last few years.

== History ==
The station was opened on 22 May 1847 as the terminus of the Soden Railway. This joined Soden with the nearest large town, Höchst, where it connected with the Taunus Railway from Frankfurt to Wiesbaden opened in 1839. The line and associated works were taken over by the Prussian state railways on 3 May 1872.

The station was rebuilt in its present form with two tracks as part of the construction of the connection to the Rhine-Main S-Bahn in 1978. At the same time, the new Limes line was built for the S-Bahn from Bad Soden station to Niederhöchstadt via Schwalbach, connecting to Frankfurt via Eschborn.

== Services ==
Line S3 of the Rhine-Main S-Bahn runs over the Limes line from Bad Soden to Frankfurt South station via Frankfurt Hauptbahnhof. Between 1979 and 1997, it also reversed at Bad Soden and continued over the Soden line to Frankfurt-Hoechst. Since 1997, the Frankfurt-Königsteiner Eisenbahn (now rebranded as the Hessische Landesbahn—Hessian State Railways) has operated the Soden line. Despite the fact that the line is electrified, it is operated, along with the Hessische Landesbahn's other routes through the Taunus, by a diesel multiple unit (usually a VT 2E, sometimes a LINT).

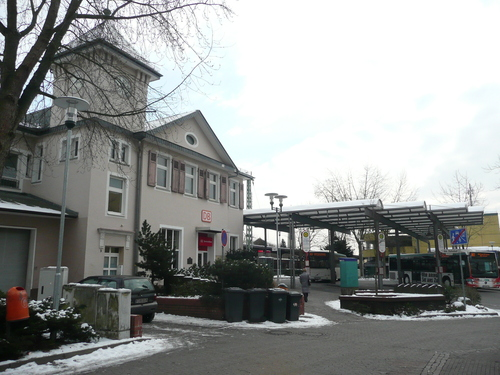
Station forecourt with bus station

The bus stop at the station is served by local bus routes 253, 803, 810, 811, 812 and 828.

== Prospects ==
The line of the S3 between Niederhöchstadt and Bad Soden has only one track, which allows maximum services at 30-minute intervals. Bad Soden has considered building another platform in order to allow operations at 15-minute intervals.
