= Rödelheim =

- Quarter of Frankfurt am Main
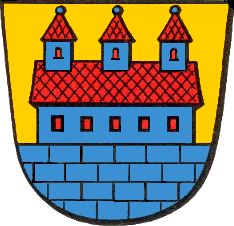
- Coat of arms

- Location of Rödelheim (red) and the Ortsbezirk Mitte-West (light red) within Frankfurt am Main
- Interactive map of Rödelheim
- Location within Germany Location within Hesse
- Coordinates: 50°07′54″N 08°36′35″E
- Country: Germany
- State: Hesse
- Admin. region: Darmstadt
- District: Urban district
- City: Frankfurt am Main

Area
  - Total: 5.145 km^{2} (1.986 sq mi)

Population (2020-12-31)
  - Total: 19,253
  - Density: 3,742/km^{2} (9,692/sq mi)
- Time zone: UTC+01:00 (CET)
  - Summer (DST): UTC+02:00 (CEST)
- Postal codes: 60488, 60489
- Dialling codes: 069
- Vehicle registration: F
- Website: www.roedelheim.de

Rödelheim (German pronunciation: [ˈʁøːdl̩haɪm]) is a quarter of Frankfurt am Main, Germany. It is part of the Ortsbezirk Mitte-West and is subdivided into the Stadtbezirke Rödelheim-Ost and Rödelheim-West.

The name Rödelheim became well known in Germany and beyond since the 1990s due to the success of German hip-hop act Rödelheim Hartreim Projekt established by Moses Pelham and his 3p-record label, that raised further successful acts like Sabrina Setlur, Xavier Naidoo, Glashaus, Cassandra Steen, Azad, Chima.

== Jewish history in Rödelheim ==
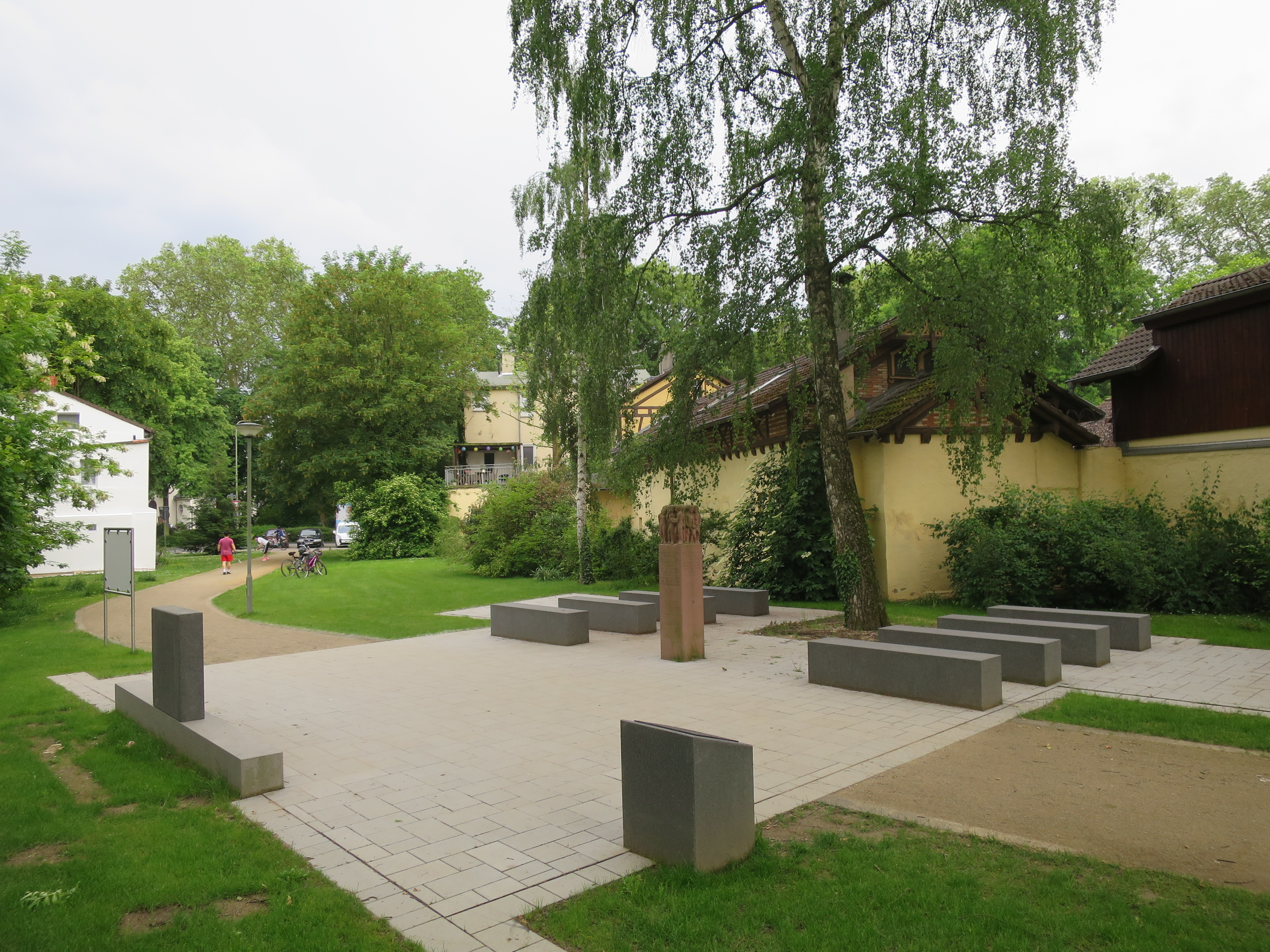
Memorial for the former synagogue

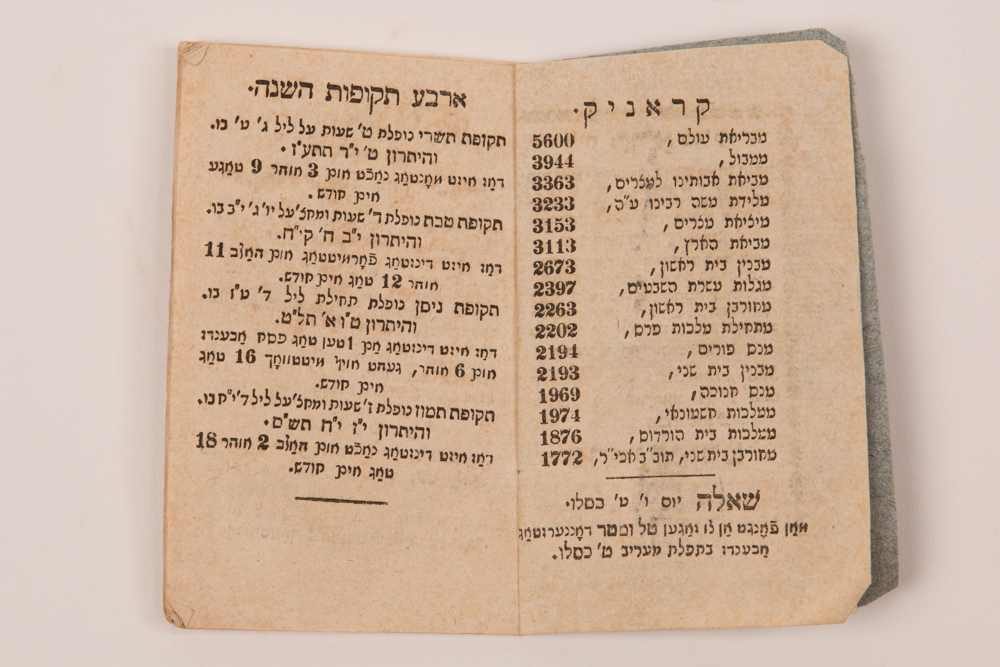
Hebrew calendar for the year 1840/41. Printed by I. Lehrberger u. Comp., Rödelheim. In the collection of the Jewish Museum of Switzerland.

From the 17th century, Rödelheim developed into a centre of Yiddish Kabbalistic folklore. An edition of the Ma'assebuch was published here in 1753 by Jona ben Josche Gamburg and printed by Karl Reich.

In 1799, the publisher and scholar Benjamin Wolf Heidenheim founded a printing press that published Jewish prayer books and theological works. Heidenheim then lived in Rödelheim until his death in 1832. Seligman Baer, a masoretic scholar and Hebrew grammarian of the modern period, also published in Rödelheim. Rödelheim had become a major center for the printing and export of Hebrew books, many of which can be found in the Jewish Museum of Switzerland’s collection.

Between 1680 and 1700, the Jewish community assembled in a barn. The first synagogue was established in 1730 at Schulstraße No. 9 (today's Inselgäßchen). At this time the Jewish community consisted of about 80 people. The Jewish community of Rödelheim was subject to the rabbinate of Gießen.

With the growth of the community, a new synagogue was built and consecrated on 29 June 1838. Ludwig Thudichum, the pastor of the Protestant Cyriakusgemeinde, gave an inauguration speech. The synagogue was built in an “oriental” style of architecture. It was damaged on the night of the 9/10 November 1938 ("Reichspogromnacht"), the interior having been set on fire. The last residents had to leave the building on 3 November 1939, after which it was used as a storage room for a car repair shop. The building was destroyed by Allied bombs on 22 March 1944.

Today, the site of the synagogue is marked with a memorial by sculptor Christof Krause, erected in 1979. An extension was added in 2015, with a row of paving stones indicating the outline of the synagogue and 8 stone blocks indicating the rows of seats. A stone with the relief of a menorah marks the site of the former Torah shrine. In addition, there are a number of Stolpersteine (stumbling stones) in Rödelheim commemorating the lives of Jews and others persecuted under National Socialist rule.

== Economics and infrastructure ==
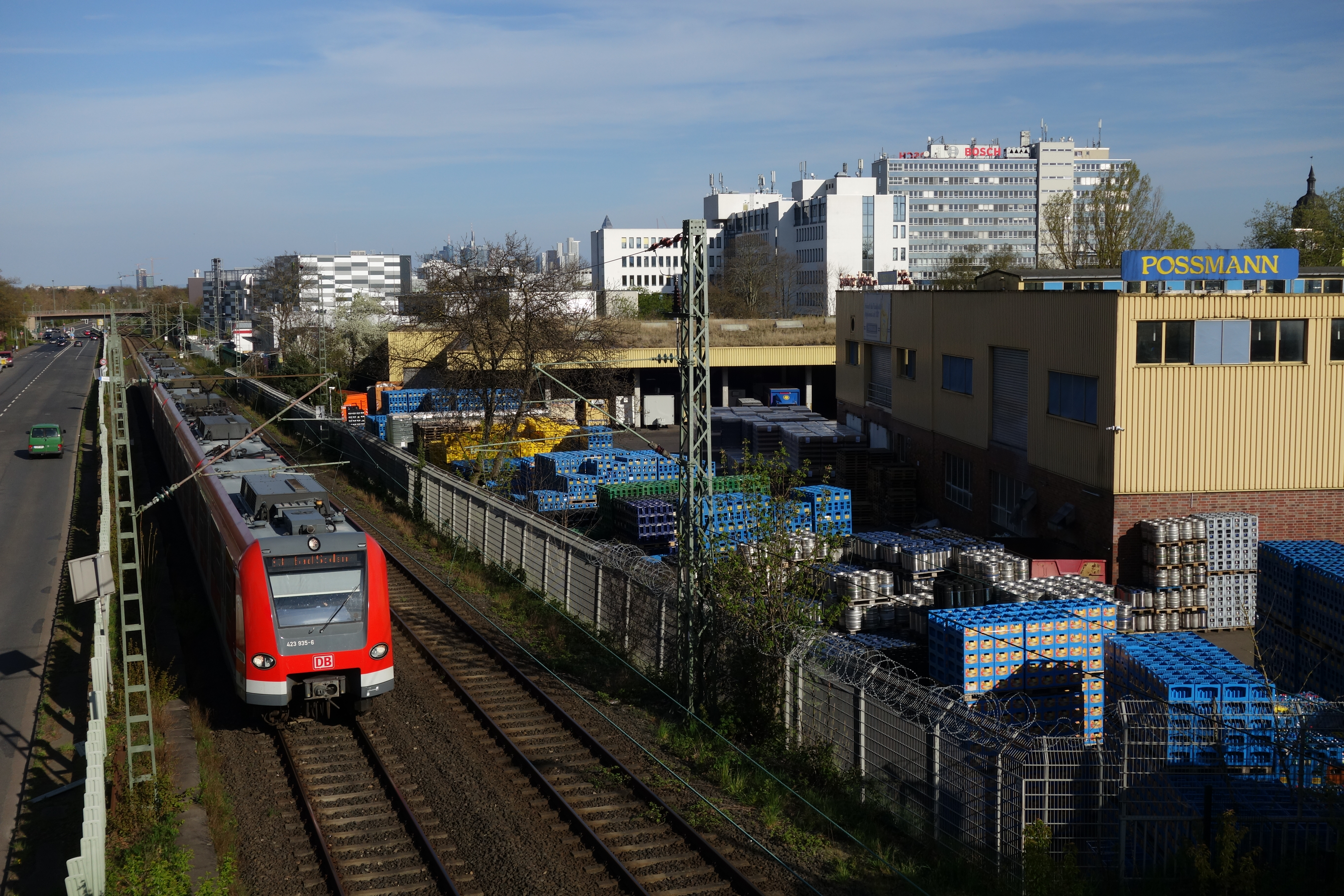
Rhine-Main S-Bahn line S3 along Kronberg Railway passing the western business park of Rödelheim with "Kelterei Possmann" in the foreground

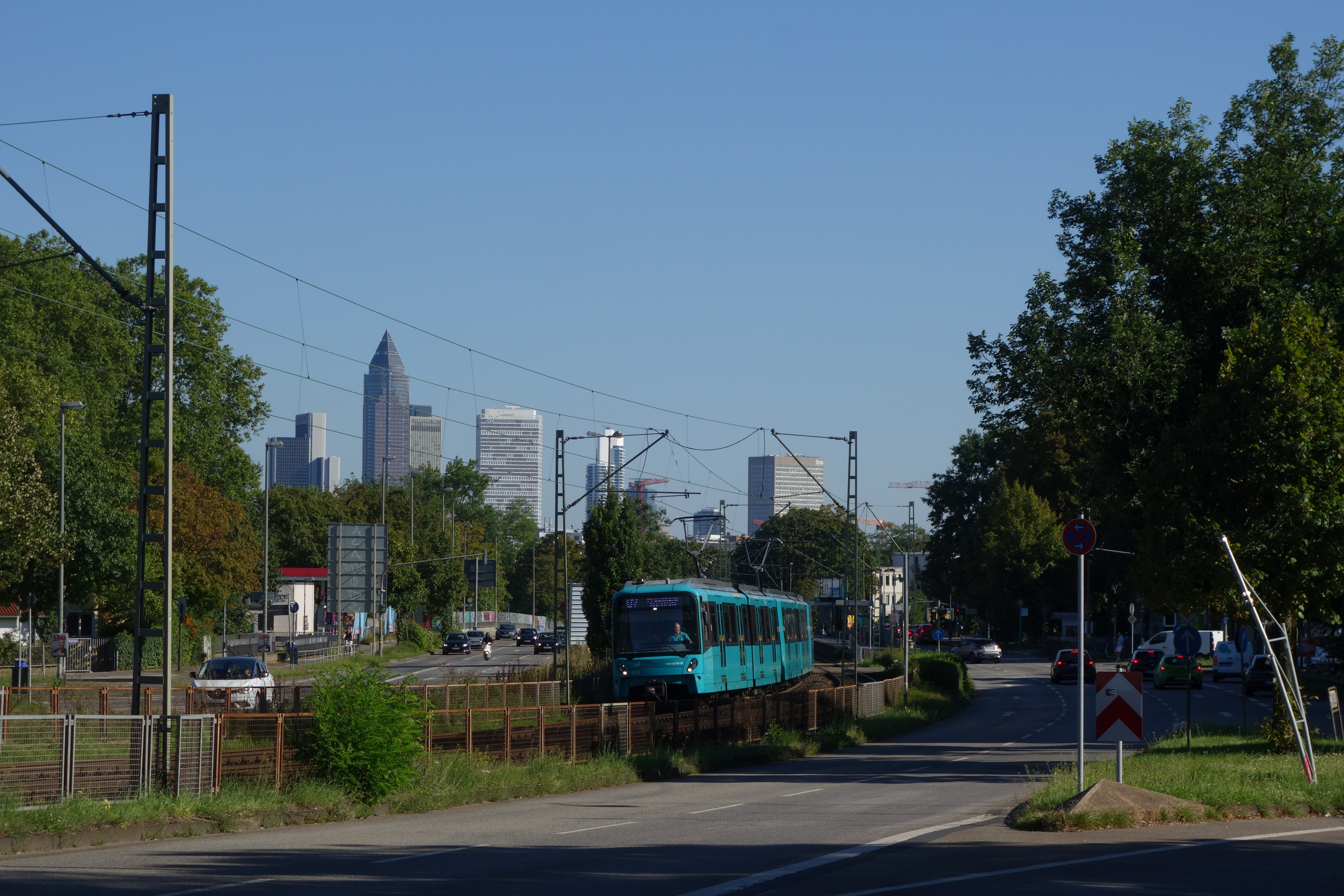
U7 train on Ludwig-Landmann-Straße (here part of Bundesstraße 44)

=== Companies ===
One of Rödelheim's biggest employers is Aumovio, an automotive-technology company spin-off by Continental AG. Further on there are a few data centers, operated by NTT Data and other companies. Well known in the region and beyond is Kelterei Possmann a traditional manufacturer of Apfelwein.

=== Transport ===
==== Public transport ====
Rödelheim station is connected to the Homburg Railway, Kronberg Railway begins here, both served by Rhine-Main S-Bahn (lines S3, S4 and S5). At rush hour additionally Regionalbahn line 15 goes to Waldsolms-Brandoberndorf via Taunus Railway as well as to Frankfurt main station.

Line U7 of Frankfurt U-Bahn (actually a Stadtbahn) runs along the eastern border of the quarter as branch of U-Bahn Line C.

In Rödelheim bus-line 56 operates as well as Metrobus lines M34, M55, M60 and M72.

==== Roads ====
The Bundesautobahn 66 motorway runs through the northern part of Rödelheim. The western boundary of the district is formed by the Bundesautobahn 5, the southwestern by the Bundesautobahn 648. The Bundesstraße (federal highway) 44 begins in the east.

== Trivia ==
In 2015 the skeletons of 200 French soldiers that had died in 1813 were discovered here.

== People ==
- Hermann Hoffmann (1819-1891), German botanist
- Karl Friedrich Freiherr von Schorlemer (1886-1936), German politician, landowner and lawyer
