= Kronberg Railway =

Railway line in Germany

Kronberg–Frankfurt-Rödelheim

Overview
- Line number: 3615
- Locale: Hesse, Germany

Service
- Route number: 645.4

Technical
- Line length: 9.5 km (5.9 mi)
- Number of tracks: 2 (Rödelheim–Niederhöchstadt)
- Track gauge: 1,435 mm (4 ft 8 1/2 in) standard gauge
- Electrification: 15 kV/16.7 Hz AC overhead

The Kronberg Railway (German: Kronberger Bahn) is now the northern part of Frankfurt S-Bahn line S4, which connects Frankfurt am Main and Kronberg im Taunus in Hesse, Germany. The route branches off the Homburg line in Rödelheim and continues via Eschborn Süd, Eschborn and Niederhöchstadt to Kronberg.

== History ==
The Kronberg Railway Company (Cronberger Eisenbahn-Gesellschaft, using the old spelling of Kronberg) opened its 9.8 km-long line from Rödelheim for passengers on 1 November 1874. The carriage of freight, which was never great, followed on 1 March 1875. The Prussian government had granted a concession for the line on 26 June 1872. The purpose of the line was to serve the then already strong tourist traffic from Frankfurt to the Anterior Taunus (Vordertaunus, the now suburbanised foothills of the Taunus near Frankfurt). Numerous wealthy citizens of Frankfurt had already established their residence (or second residence) there, leading to steadily growing commuter traffic. Soon, direct trains began running from Frankfurt to Kronberg.

On 1 January 1914, the company was taken over by the Prussian government and the line became part of the Prussian state railways.

German Federal Railways established a regular interval timetable in 1954, with services every 30 minutes on the line (as well as on the Homburg line), long before the opening of the Rhine-Main S-Bahn. Since 27 September 1970 electric trains have operated on the line. On 28 May 1978 the line began to be used by S-Bahn line S4, initially to Hauptwache.

== New construction ==
S4 (DBAG Class 430) at station in Eschborn, direction to Kronberg im Taunus

On 22 December 1970 a branch, the Limes Railway, was opened from Niederhöchstadt to Schwalbach am Taunus and it was extended to Bad Soden am Taunus on 6 November 1972. The line is now served by S-Bahn line S3 between Darmstadt and Frankfurt South Station, like S4, too.

The Kronberg Railway was at first entirely single-track, but in the course of developing the S-Bahn the section from Rödelheim to Niederhöchstadt was duplicated; only the Niederhöchstadt–Kronberg section is still single track.

== Current situation ==
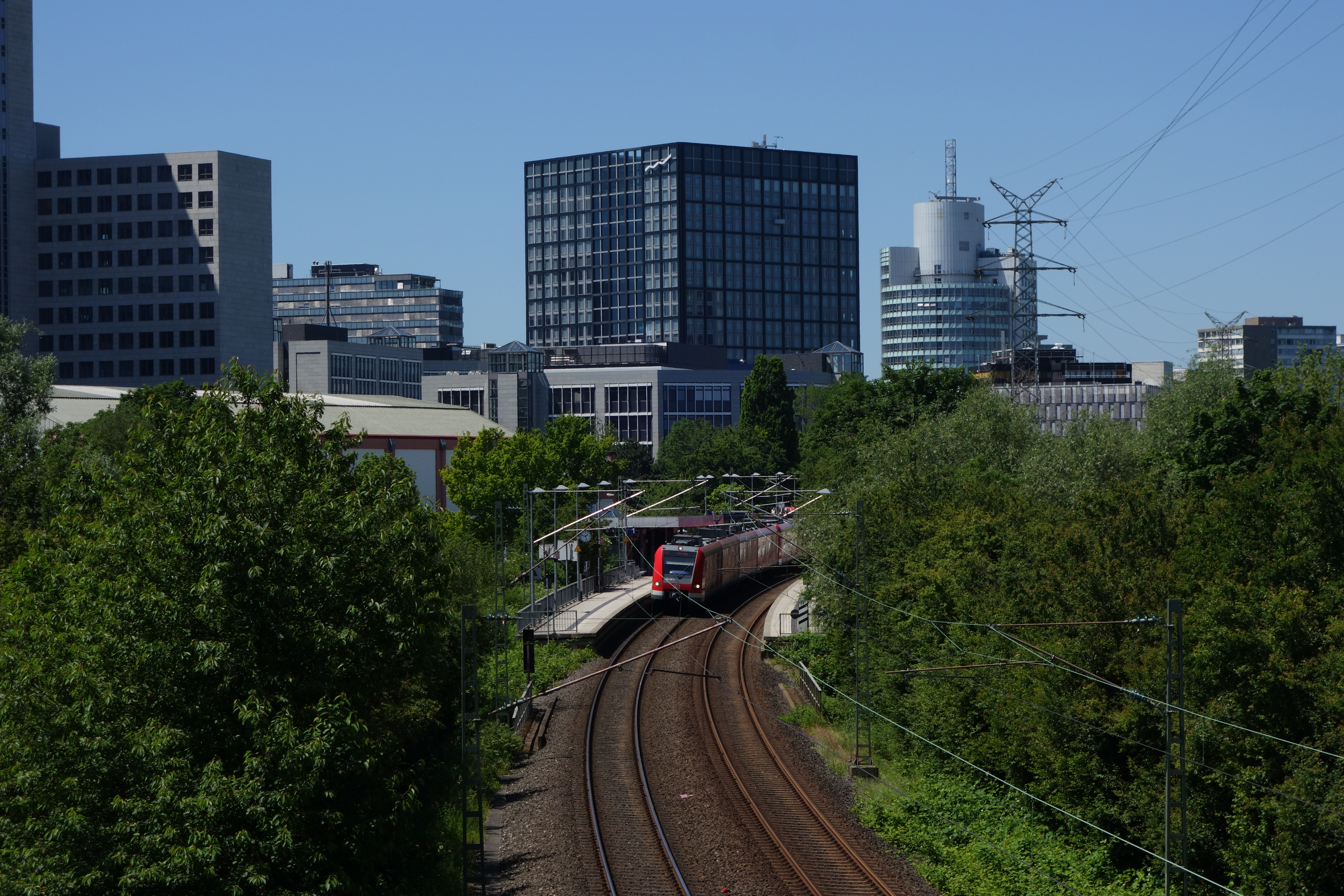
S-train station Eschborn Süd with DB class 423 as S 4, heading for Langen. (Above the new building of Deutsche Börse called The Cube)

The Eschborn Süd station was opened in 1978 during the establishment of the S-Bahn to promote an office development in Eschborn. It was rebuilt in 2007 and became barrier-free in 2008.

There was a station for many years between Niederhöchstadt and Kronberg for the Braun plant, which was only served during peak hours and only for Braun employees. This was expanded in late 1990 and incorporated into normal operations in 1999 under the name Kronberg Süd.
