= S3 (Rhine-Main S-Bahn) =

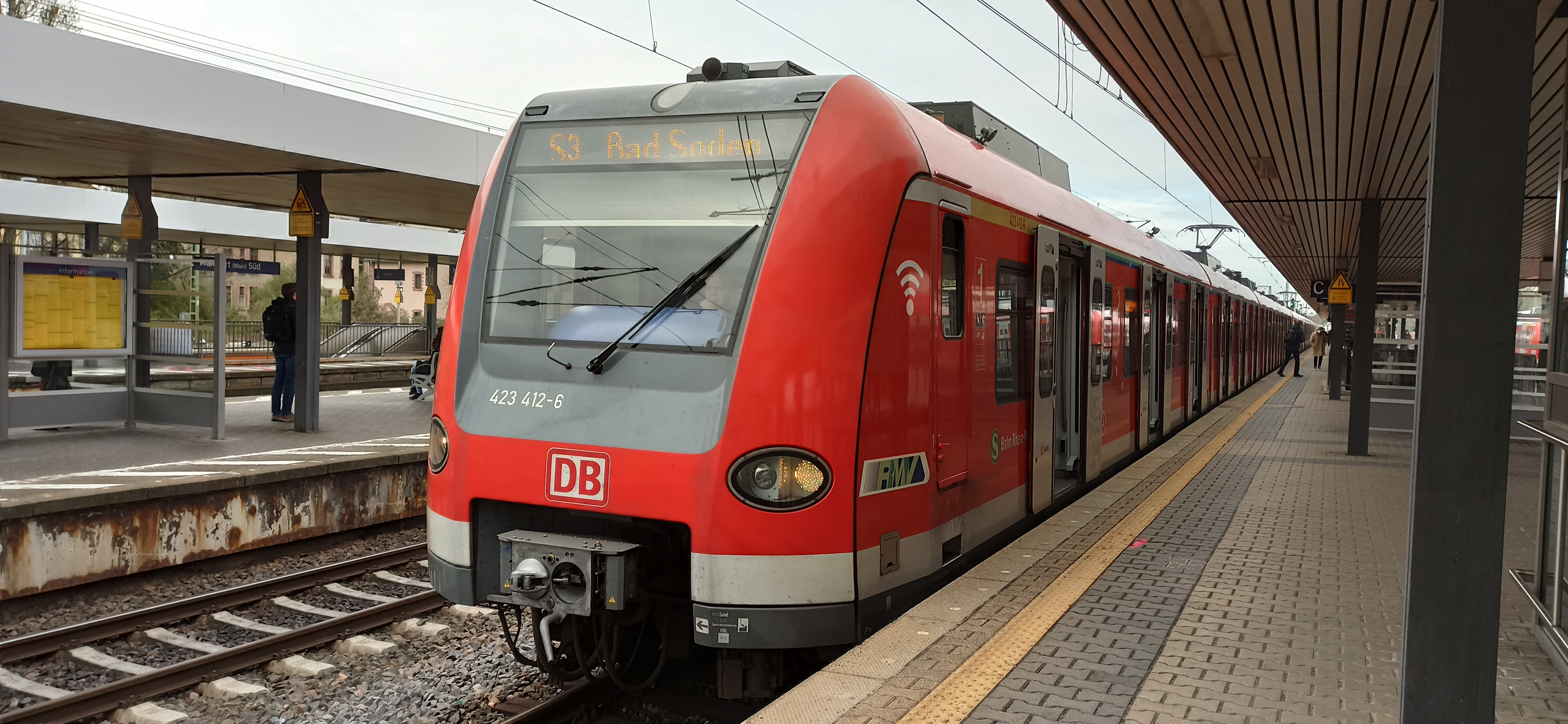
- S3 towards Bad Soden at Frankfurt (Main) Süd

Overview
- Status: Operational
- Owner: Rhein-Main-Verkehrsverbund
- Line number: 3
- Locale: Frankfurt Rhine-Main
- Termini: Bad Soden; Frankfurt Süd
- Stations: 18

Service
- Type: Rapid transit, Commuter rail
- System: S-Bahn Rhein-Main
- Services: Limes Railway, Homburg Railway, Citytunnel Frankfurt
- Route number: 645.3
- Operator(s): DB Regio
- Depot(s): Frankfurt Hbf
- Rolling stock: DBAG Class 423

History
- Opened: 28 May 1978

Technical
- Track gauge: 1,435 mm (4 ft 8 1/2 in) standard gauge
- Electrification: Overhead line

The S3 service of the S-Bahn Rhein-Main system bearing the KBS (German scheduled railway route) number 645.3

== Lines ==
=== City tunnel ===
The city tunnel is an underground, pure S-Bahn route used by almost all services (except for the S7 service which terminates at the central station).

== History ==
Year	Stations	Route
1974 (R3)	11	Frankfurt-Höchst – Frankfurt Hbf
1978	15 (+4)	Frankfurt-Höchst – Hauptwache
1983	16 (+1)	Frankfurt-Höchst – Konstablerwache
1990	19 (+3)	Frankfurt-Höchst – Frankfurt Süd
1997	26 (+10, -3)	Bad Soden – Darmstadt Hbf
1999	27 (+1)	Bad Soden – Darmstadt Hbf
2002	28 (+1)	Bad Soden – Darmstadt Hbf
2008	29 (+1)	Bad Soden – Darmstadt Hbf
2024	18 (-11)	Bad Soden – Frankfurt Süd

The S3 was one of the first six services of the Rhine-Main S-Bahn system. In a prior test operation it ran between Frankfurt-Höchst and Frankfurt Central Station. The service was then called R3 where the letter "R" stands for regional. After the opening of the Frankfurt Citytunnel the service was renamed to S3 and extended to the new Hauptwache underground station. Further extensions of the tunnel followed in 1983 (Konstablerwache) and 1990 (Ostendstraße and Lokalbahnhof) so that the Südbahnhof (South station) became the service's eastern terminal.

== Operation ==
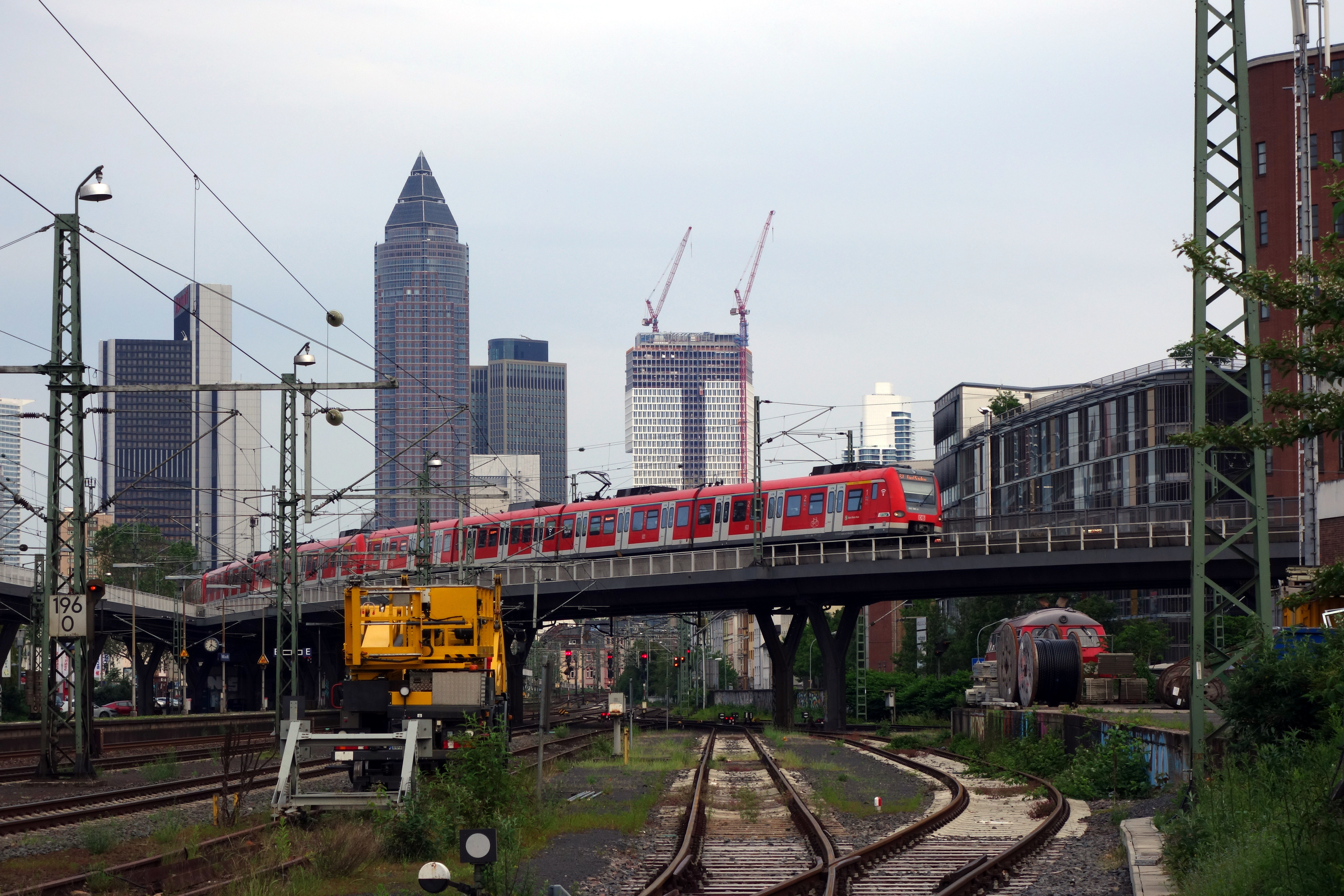
S3 to Bad Soden departing Frankfurt West

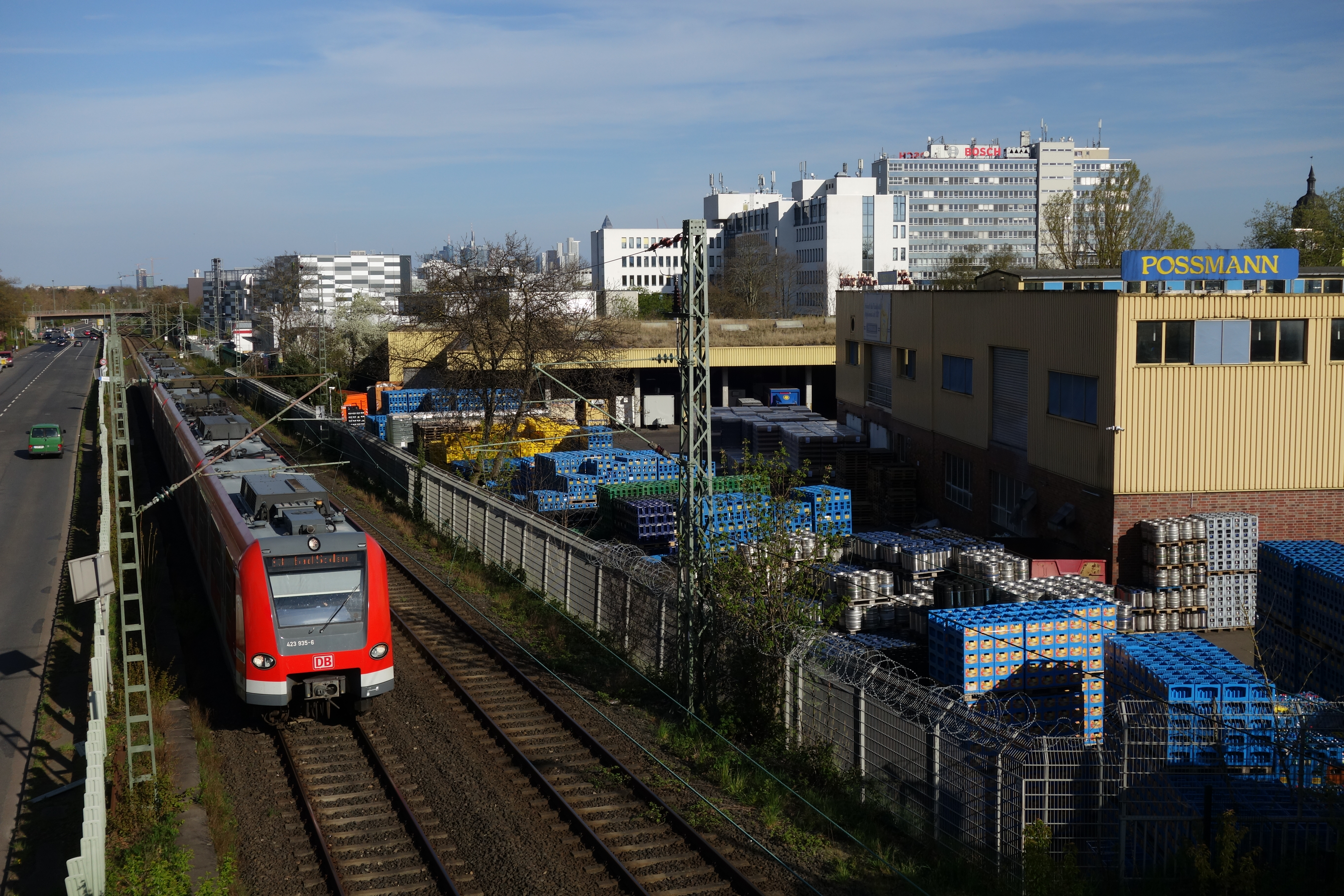
S3 in Frankfurt-Rödelheim passing the western business park

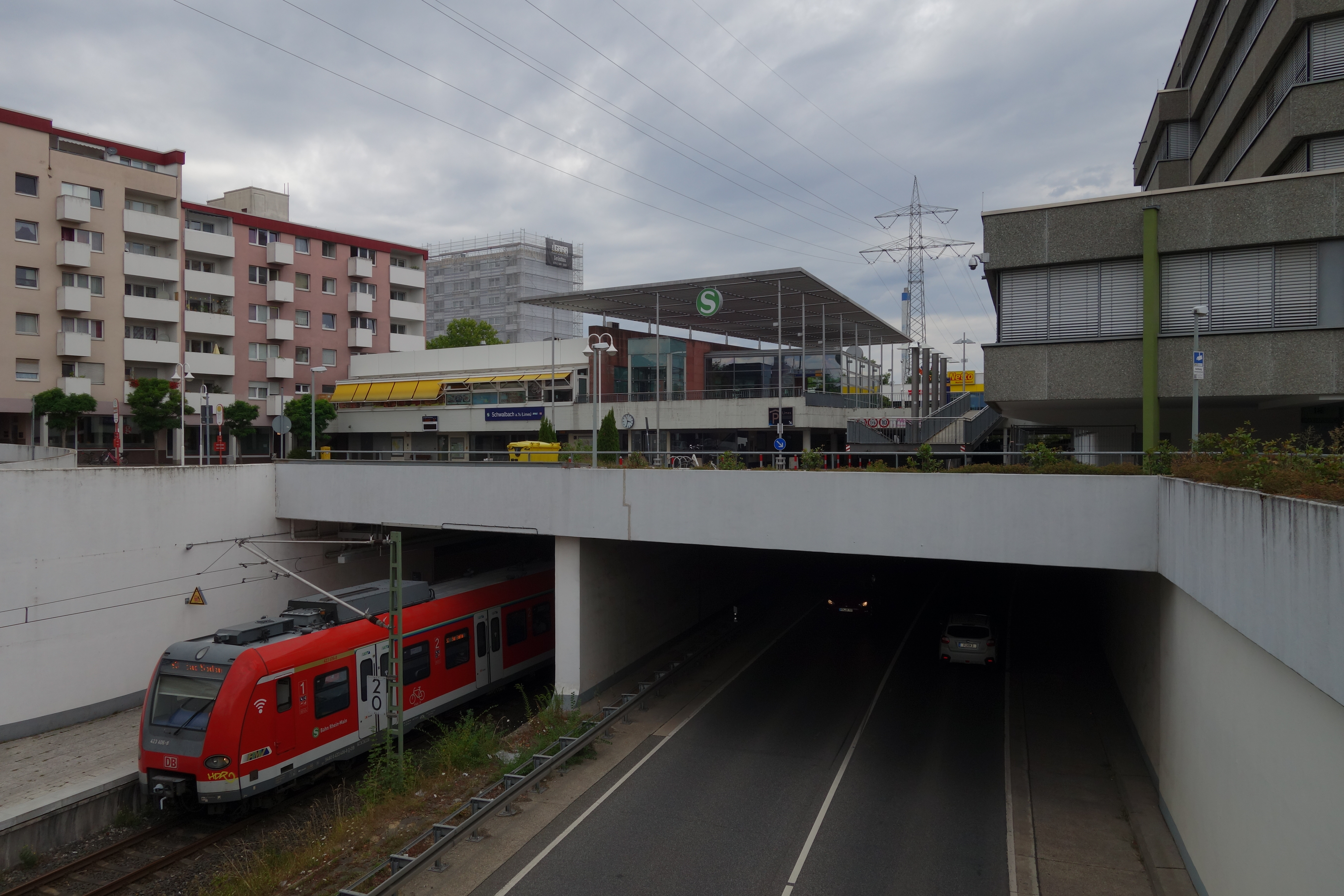
S3 departing Schwalbach Limes station

S3 (Rhine-Main S-Bahn)	Journey time		Station	Transfer	S-Bahn service since
=== Main-Taunus-Kreis ===
	0		Bad Soden		1978
	2	+2	Sulzbach Nord		1978
	4	+2	Schwalbach Limes		1978
	6	+2	Schwalbach Nord		2008
	8	+2	Eschborn-Niederhöchstadt	S4 (Rhine-Main S-Bahn)	1978
	10	+2	Eschborn	S4 (Rhine-Main S-Bahn)	1978
	12	+2	Eschborn-Süd	S4 (Rhine-Main S-Bahn)	1978
=== Frankfurt am Main ===
	15	+3	Frankfurt-Rödelheim	S4 (Rhine-Main S-Bahn) S5 (Rhine-Main S-Bahn)	1978
	19	+4	Frankfurt West	S4 (Rhine-Main S-Bahn) S5 (Rhine-Main S-Bahn) S6 (Rhine-Main S-Bahn)	1978
	21	+2	Frankfurt Messe	S4 (Rhine-Main S-Bahn) S5 (Rhine-Main S-Bahn) S6 (Rhine-Main S-Bahn)	1999
	23	+2	Frankfurt Galluswarte	S4 (Rhine-Main S-Bahn) S5 (Rhine-Main S-Bahn) S6 (Rhine-Main S-Bahn)	1978
	26	+3	Frankfurt Hbf (tief)	U4 U5	1978
	28	+2	Taunusanlage	S1 (Rhine-Main S-Bahn) S2 (Rhine-Main S-Bahn) S4 (Rhine-Main S-Bahn) S5 (Rhine-Main S-Bahn) S6 (Rhine-Main S-Bahn) S8 (Rhine-Main S-Bahn) S9 (Rhine-Main S-Bahn)	1978
	30	+2	Hauptwache	U1 U2 U3 U6 U7 U8	1978
	31	+1	Konstablerwache	U4 U5 U6 U7	1983
	33	+2	Ostendstraße	S1 (Rhine-Main S-Bahn) S2 (Rhine-Main S-Bahn) S4 (Rhine-Main S-Bahn) S5 (Rhine-Main S-Bahn) S6 (Rhine-Main S-Bahn) S8 (Rhine-Main S-Bahn) S9 (Rhine-Main S-Bahn)	1990
	35	+2	Frankfurt Lokalbahnhof	S4 (Rhine-Main S-Bahn) S5 (Rhine-Main S-Bahn) S6 (Rhine-Main S-Bahn)	1990
	36	+1	Frankfurt South Station	U1 U2 U3 U8	1990
