= Frankfurt (Main) Süd station =

Railway station in Frankfurt, Germany

Frankfurt (Main) Süd
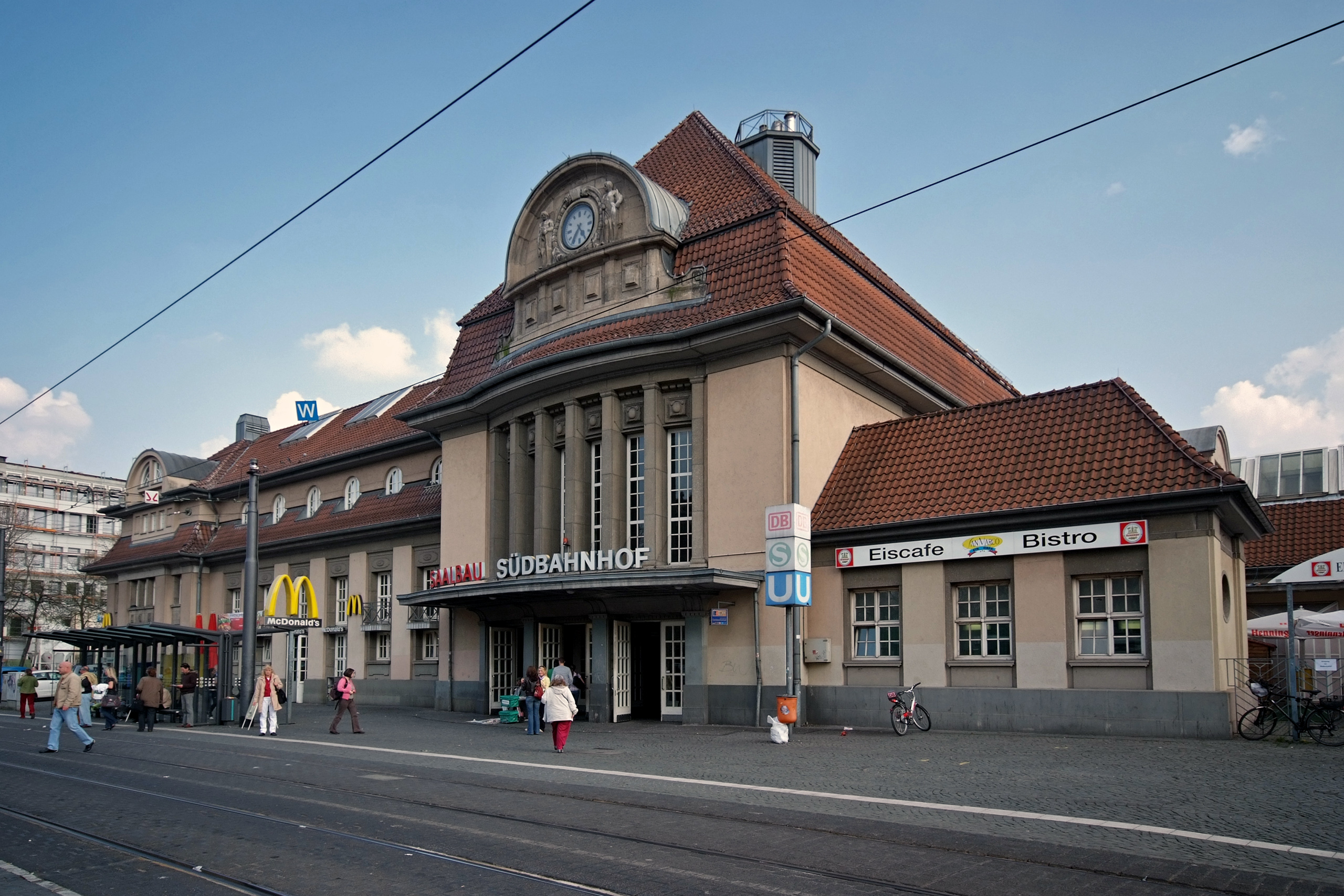
- Entrance building

General information
- Location: Hedderichstraße 51, Frankfurt, Hesse; Germany
- Coordinates: 50°5′58″N 8°41′10″E
- System: Through station
- Lines: Frankfurt–Hanau (north bank) (KBS 640, KBS 641; Frankfurt–Göttingen railway (KBS 615, KBS 641); Frankfurt Stadion–Frankfurt South (KBS 471, KBS 645.8, KBS 645.9); Frankfurt (Main) Hbf (low)–Frankfurt (Main) South KBS 645.3–6)
- Platforms: 5
- Tracks: 9

Construction
- Accessible: Yes (S-Bahn tracks only)
- Architectural style: Jugendstil

Other information
- Station code: 1856
- DS100 code: FFS
- Category: 2
- Fare zone: : 5010
- Website: www.bahnhof.de

History
- Opened: 15 November 1873

Passengers
- 22,500
Services
Preceding station	DB Fernverkehr	Following station
Frankfurt Airport One-way operation	ICE 12	Hanau Hbf towards Berlin Ostbahnhof
Frankfurt (Main) Hbf Terminus	ICE 13	Fulda towards Berlin Ostbahnhof
Frankfurt Airport Terminus	ICE 13	Fulda towards Berlin Ostbahnhof
Darmstadt Hbf towards Karlsruhe Hbf or Stuttgart Hbf	ICE 13	Fulda towards Berlin Ostbahnhof
Preceding station		Following station
Fulda towards Berlin Hbf	FLX 10	Darmstadt Hbf towards Stuttgart Hbf
Preceding station	DB Regio Mitte	Following station
Frankfurt (Main) Hbf Terminus	RE 50	Offenbach (Main) Hbf towards Bebra
Frankfurt (Main) Hbf Terminus	RB 51	Offenbach (Main) Hbf towards Wächtersbach
Preceding station	DB Regio Bayern	Following station
Frankfurt (Main) Hbf Terminus	RE 54	Frankfurt (Main) Ost towards Bamberg
Frankfurt (Main) Hbf Terminus	RE 55	Offenbach (Main) Hbf towards Würzburg Hbf
Preceding station	Hessische Landesbahn	Following station
Frankfurt Airport long-distance towards Rüsselsheim Opelwerk	RB 58	Frankfurt (Main) Ost towards Laufach
Frankfurt Airport regional Terminus	RE 59	Frankfurt (Main) Ost towards Bamberg
Preceding station	VIAS	Following station
Frankfurt (Main) Hbf Terminus	RE 85	Offenbach (Main) Hbf towards Groß-Umstadt-Wiebelsbach
Preceding station	Rhine-Main S-Bahn	Following station
Lokalbahnhof towards Bad Soden	S3 (Rhine-Main S-Bahn)	Terminus
Lokalbahnhof towards Kronberg	S4 (Rhine-Main S-Bahn)	Terminus
Lokalbahnhof towards Friedrichsdorf	S5 (Rhine-Main S-Bahn)	Terminus
Lokalbahnhof towards Friedberg (Hess)	S6 (Rhine-Main S-Bahn)	Stresemannallee towards Darmstadt Hbf
Other services
Preceding station	Frankfurt U-Bahn	Following station
Schweizer Platz towards Ginnheim	U1	Terminus
Schweizer Platz towards Bad Homburg-Gonzenheim	U2	Terminus
Schweizer Platz towards Oberursel Hohemark	U3	Terminus
Schweizer Platz towards Ginnheim	U8	Terminus
Location

Frankfurt (Main) Süd (Frankfurt (Main) South) or Frankfurt Südbahnhof is one of three railway stations for long-distance train services in Frankfurt, Germany. Unlike Frankfurt Hauptbahnhof it is not a terminus but a through station, and has nine tracks with five platforms. It is a stopping station for some long-distance routes (ICE, IC) and for regional traffic (Regional-Express and RegionalBahn). It is also one of the major rapid-transit railway hubs in the city with S-Bahn and U-Bahn services.

== Environment ==
The station is located in the district of Sachsenhausen south of the Main. From the station forecourt, the Diesterwegplatz, five streets radiate: Hedderichstraße to the southwest and northeast, Diesterweg to the northwest, leading to Schweizer Platz, Stegstraße to the north (leading to the Eiserner Steg—Iron Bridge—for pedestrians) and Brückenstraße to the northeast (leading to the Alte Brücke—Old Bridge). On Diesterwegplatz, there is a market on Tuesdays and Fridays.

A block west of the station runs the Schweizer Straße, the main axis of Sachsenhausen. Immediately northeast of the station forecourt, between Hedderichstraße and Textorstraße was the old Sachsenhausen Tram Depot, which was closed in 2003 and has since been gutted and rebuilt. It now contains a large supermarket and an office of the Frankfurt city library. The southern exit from the station leads to the Mörfelder Landstraße.

== History ==
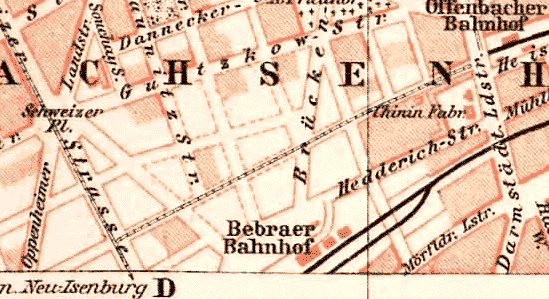
Environs of the former Bebraer Bahnhof, 1893

The government of the Electorate of Hesse (Kurhessen) had begun building the Frankfurt–Bebra railway from Bebra in North Hesse to Fulda, Hanau and Frankfurt before its annexation by Prussia after the Austro-Prussian War of 1866. The project was completed by the Prussian state railways on 15 December 1868. Until the opening of the line south of the Main, trains from Bebra to Frankfurt had to use the line north of the Main and the Frankfurt City Link Line. On 15 November 1873 the new line south of the Main between Hanau and Frankfurt via Sachsenhausen and Offenbach was opened, including South Station (opened as Bebraer Bahnhof, "Bebra line" station) and Offenbach Hauptbahnhof. The South Main line is still the most important rail link connecting Frankfurt with Leipzig, Berlin and Hamburg.

After the completion of South Main line, the Frankfurt-Sachsenhausen station (Bahnhof Frankfurt-Sachsenhausen) at Darmstädter Landstraße (opened in 1848) of the Frankfurt-Offenbach Local Railway became a terminus, with trains only operating towards Offenbach. The track formerly connecting it to the Main-Neckar Railway to the west was removed. In 1876 it was renamed Lokalbahnhof; the Frankfurt Lokalbahnhof S-Bahn station is named in its honour, although it is about 250 metres south of the old station, which closed in 1955.

The current building was opened in 1914. In its simplified Art Nouveau style, it is similar to the Höchst station opened the same year. During the building of the U-Bahn station (completed in 1984), almost the entire station building was demolished and rebuilt after the completion of the tunnelling. It now includes a community centre. The former steel train shed was demolished during the U-Bahn construction and not rebuilt.

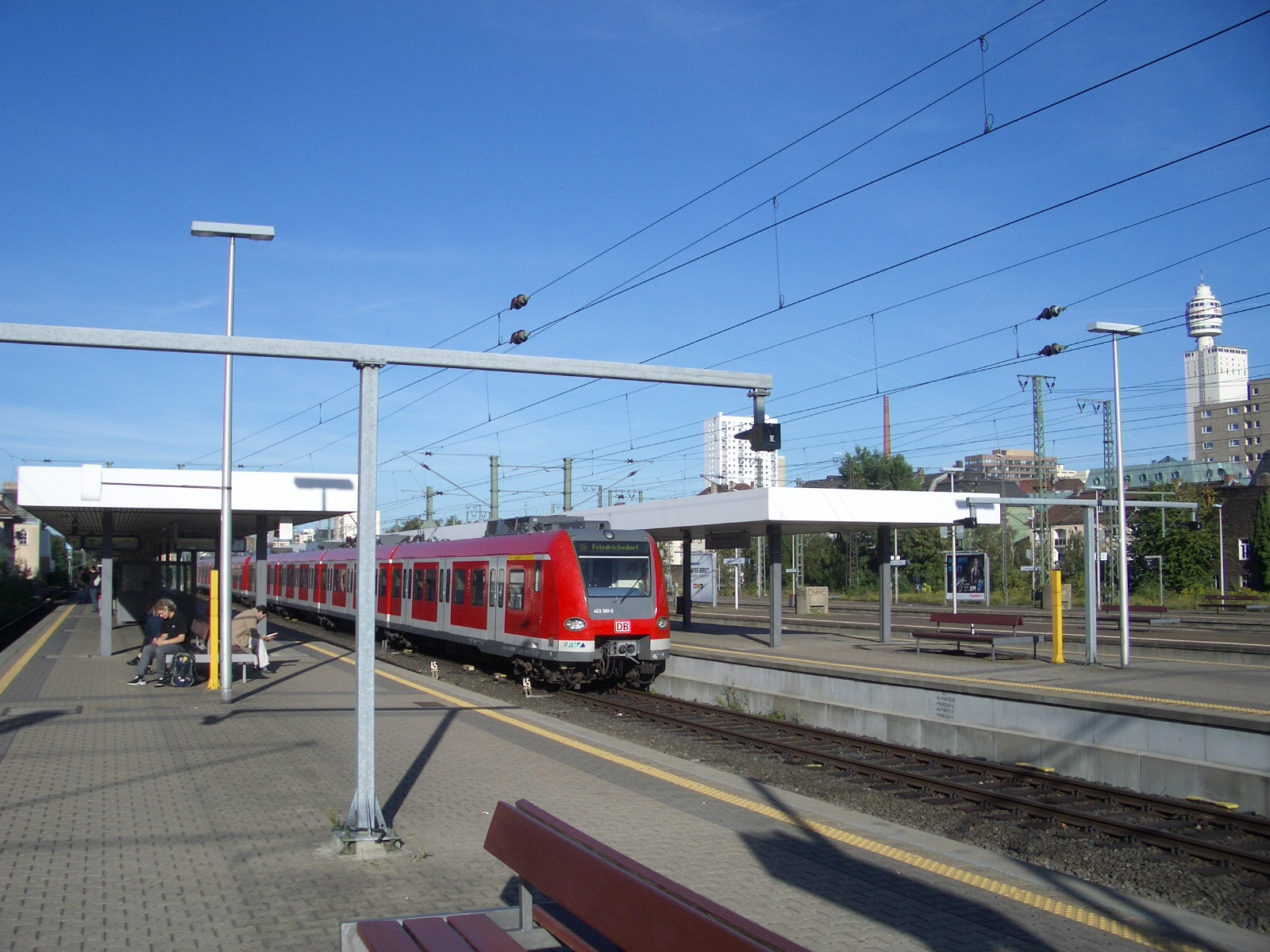
The Rhine-Main S-Bahn uses the two northern platforms, regional and mainline services use the three southern platforms.

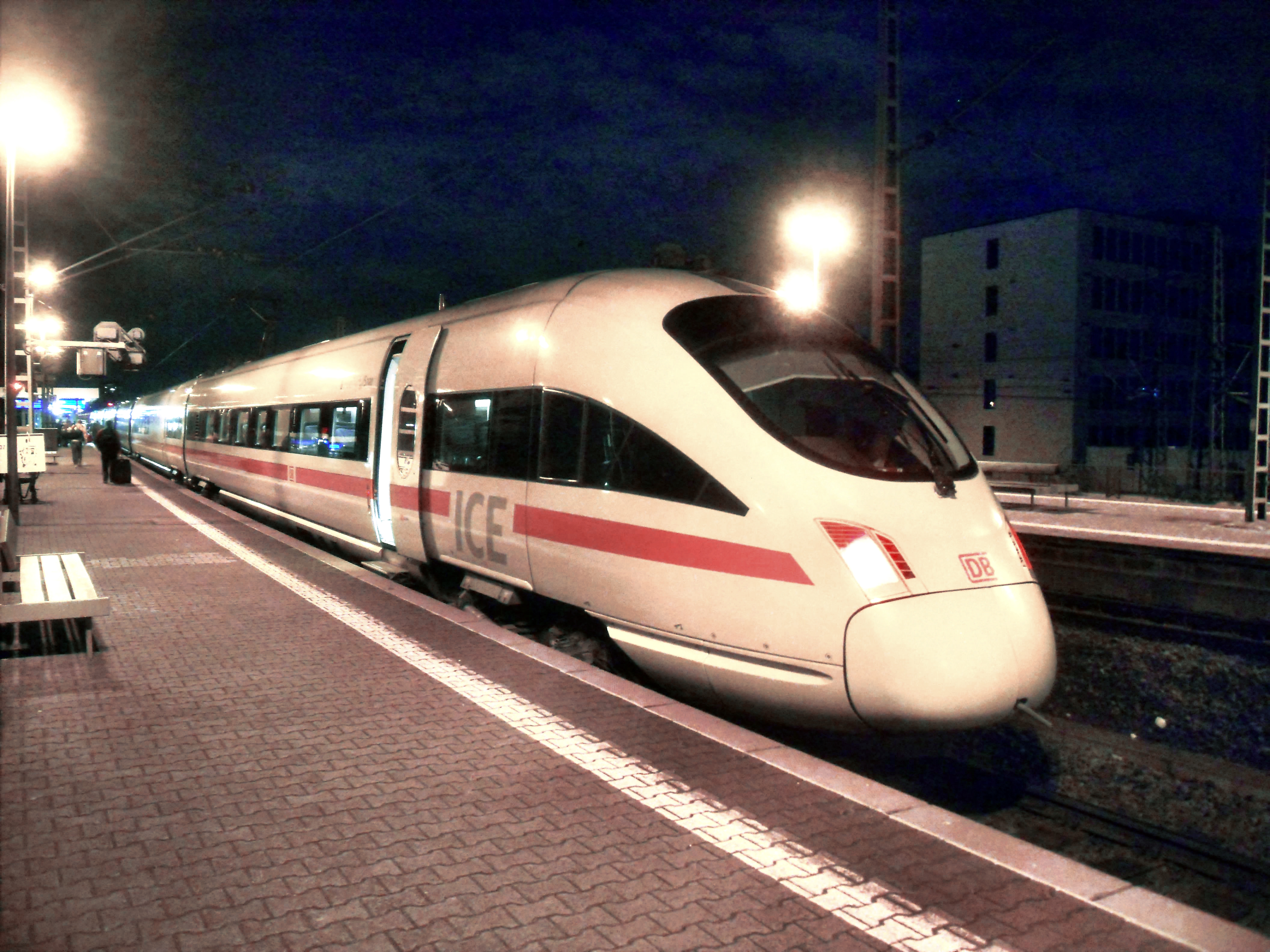
ICE T Homburg/Saar in Frankfurt South station on its way to Frankfurt Airport

== Operations ==
=== Long-distance services ===
Line	Route			Interval
ICE 12	Frankfurt → Frankfurt Airport → Frankfurt Süd → Hanau → Hanover → Wolfsburg → Berlin → Berlin Ostbahnhof			One train
ICE 13	Stuttgart –	Heidelberg – Darmstadt –	Frankfurt Süd – Kassel – Braunschweig – Wolfsburg – Berlin – Berlin Ostbahnhof	Every 2 hours
ICE 13	Karlsruhe –	Heidelberg – Darmstadt –	Frankfurt Süd – Kassel – Braunschweig – Wolfsburg – Berlin – Berlin Ostbahnhof	Every 2 hours
ICE 13	Frankfurt Airport –		Frankfurt Süd – Kassel – Braunschweig – Wolfsburg – Berlin – Berlin Ostbahnhof	Every 2 hours
NJ	Düsseldorf – Cologne – Bonn – Koblenz – Mainz – Frankfurt Airport – Frankfurt Süd – Nuremberg – Augsburg – Munich – Kufstein – Wörgl – Innsbruck			One train pair
NJ	Düsseldorf – Köln – Bonn – Koblenz – Mainz – Frankfurt Flughafen – Frankfurt Süd – Nürnberg – Passau – Linz – St. Pölten – Wien Meidling – Vienna			One train pair
FLX 10	Berlin Hbf – Berlin Südkreuz – Halle (Saale) – Erfurt – Gotha – Eisenach – Fulda – Frankfurt Süd – Darmstadt – Weinheim – Heidelberg – Stuttgart			1–2 train pairs

=== Regional services ===
The following Regional-Express and Regionalbahn services stop at Frankfurt South station:

Line	Route	Frequency
RE 50	Frankfurt (Main) Hbf – Frankfurt South – Offenbach Hauptbahnhof – Hanau – Fulda	60 min
RB 51	Frankfurt (Main) Hbf – Frankfurt South – Offenbach – Hanau Hbf – Langenselbold – Gelnhausen – Wächtersbach (– Bad Soden-Salmünster)	60 min
RE 54	Frankfurt (Main) Hbf – Frankfurt South – Maintal Ost – Hanau (– Aschaffenburg – Würzburg – Bamberg)	120 min
RE 55	Frankfurt (Main) Hbf – Frankfurt South – Offenbach – Hanau (– Aschaffenburg – Würzburg – Bamberg)	120 min
RB 58	Frankfurt (Main) Hbf – Frankfurt South – Maintal Ost – Hanau – Aschaffenburg	60 min
RE 59	Frankfurt Airport – Frankfurt South – Frankfurt Ost – Maintal Ost – Hanau (– Kahl (Main) – Aschaffenburg)	120 min (weekdays)
RE 85	Frankfurt (Main) Hbf – Frankfurt South – Offenbach – Hanau – Babenhausen – Groß-Umstadt Wiebelsbach (– Erbach (Odenw))	120 min
S3 (Rhine-Main S-Bahn)	Bad Soden (Taunus) – Frankfurt Hbf (tief) – Frankfurt South	30 min
S4 (Rhine-Main S-Bahn)	Kronberg (Taunus) – Frankfurt Hbf (tief) – Frankfurt South	30 min
S5 (Rhine-Main S-Bahn)	Friedrichsdorf (Taunus) – Bad Homburg – Frankfurt Hbf (tief) – Frankfurt South	15 min
S6 (Rhine-Main S-Bahn)	Friedberg (Hess) – Groß Karben – Bad Vilbel – Frankfurt Hbf (tief) – Frankfurt South – Langen (Hess) – Darmstadt Hbf	15 min

=== Urban public transport ===
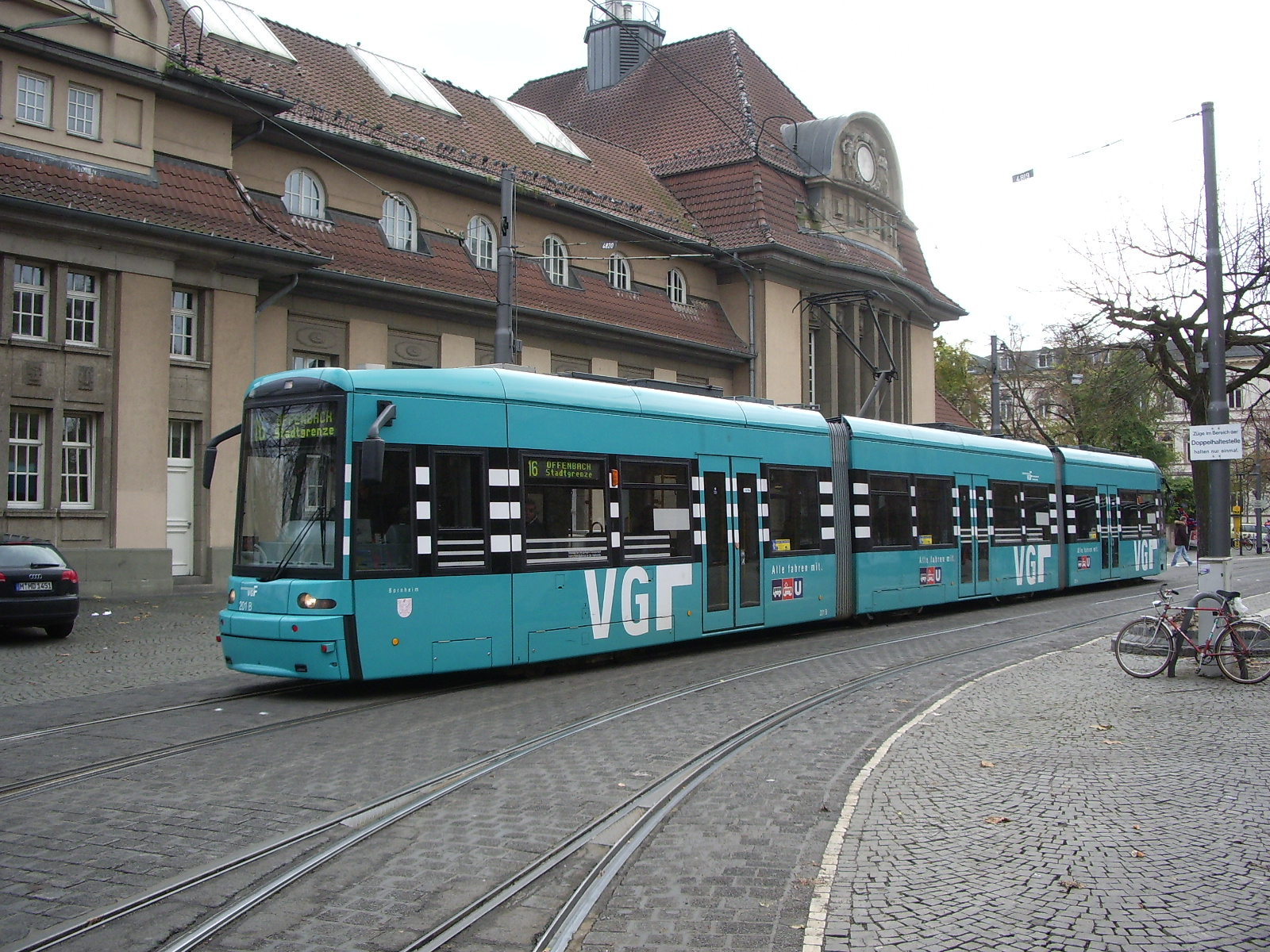
Südbahnhof tram stop

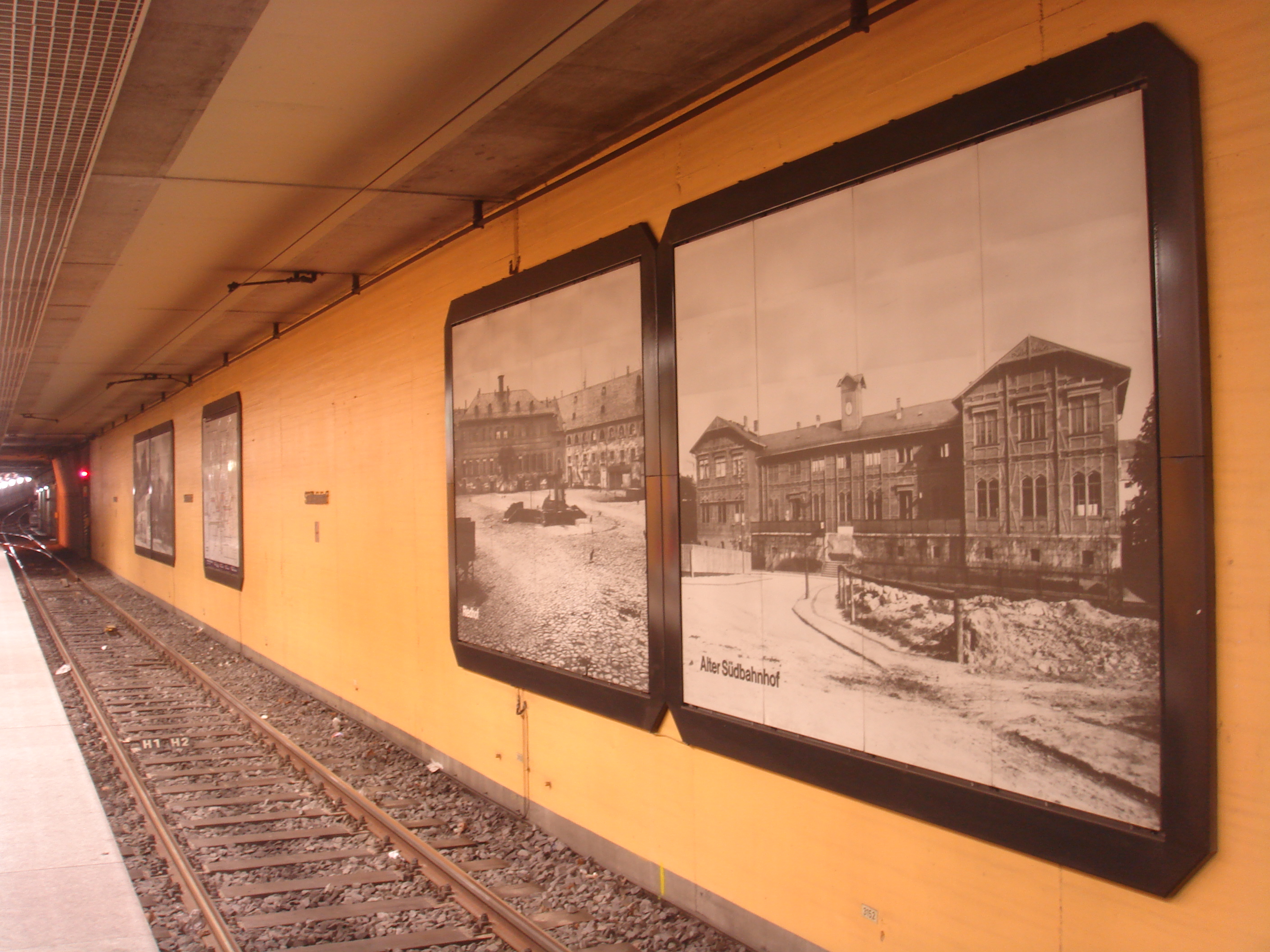
Walls of the underground station decorated with historic photographs, including of the old station building

Frankfurt South station plays a particularly important role for transport. It is at the interface between the inner city and the southern suburbs and it is served by, in addition to the regional services discussed above, lines S3 to S6 of the Rhine-Main S-Bahn, U-Bahn services on corridor A (U1 to U3 and U8), and tram lines 15, 16, 18, and the Ebbelwei Express. Tram line 19 starts at the Südbahnhof/Schweizer Straße stop. Numerous city and regional bus lines run from the station, especially to the southern region and to Frankfurt Airport. Some of these buses stop at the southern entrance on Mörfelder Landstraße.

== See also ==
- Rail transport in Germany
- Railway stations in Germany
