= Frankfurt Messe station =

Railway station in Germany

Frankfurt am Main Messe
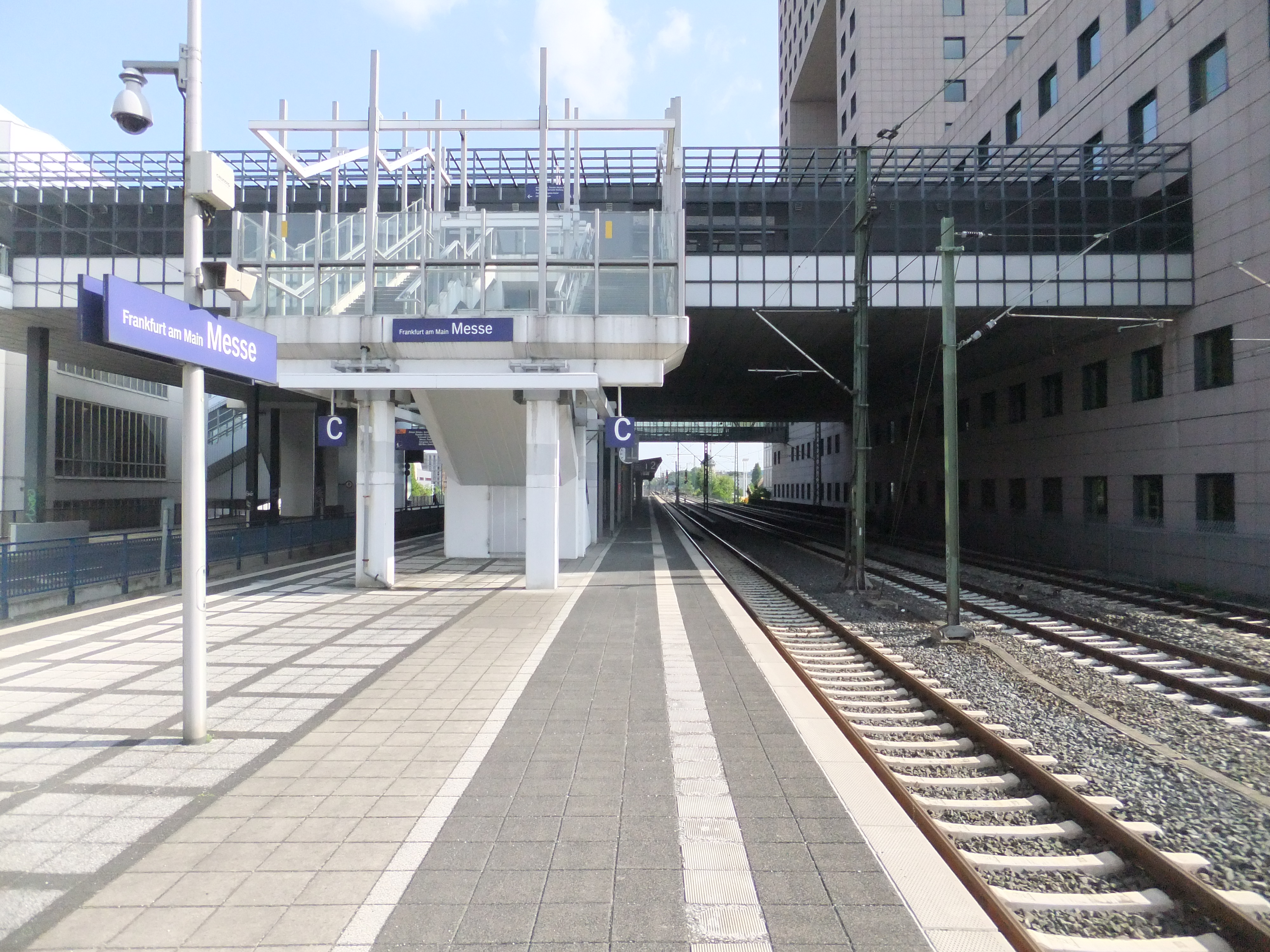

General information
- Location: Emser Brücke 2, Frankfurt am Main, Hesse; Germany
- Coordinates: 50°6′43″N 8°38′36″E
- Owner: DB Netz
- Operator: DB Station&Service
- Lines: Homburg Railway; Main-Weser Railway
- Platforms: 2
- Train operators: S-Bahn Rhein-Main

Other information
- Station code: 7980
- DS100 code: FFME
- IBNR: 8079632
- Category: 4
- Fare zone: : 5001
- Website: www.bahnhof.de

History
- Opened: 1999; 27 years ago

Services
Preceding station	Rhine-Main S-Bahn	Following station
Frankfurt West towards Bad Soden	S3 (Rhine-Main S-Bahn)	Galluswarte towards Südbahnhof
Frankfurt West towards Kronberg	S4 (Rhine-Main S-Bahn)	Galluswarte towards Südbahnhof
Frankfurt West towards Friedrichsdorf	S5 (Rhine-Main S-Bahn)	Galluswarte towards Südbahnhof
Frankfurt West towards Friedberg (Hess)	S6 (Rhine-Main S-Bahn)	Galluswarte towards Darmstadt Hbf
Location

Frankfurt am Main Messe station (German: Bahnhof Frankfurt am Main Messe) is an S-Bahn station in Frankfurt am Main, Germany, in the district of Bockenheim in the middle of the Frankfurt Trade Fair grounds. The station was opened in 1999 to improve the fair's public transport connections. It consists of two platform tracks facing a central platform. Constructing the platform was a complex procedure as the space between the tracks had to be enlarged. The road next to the line had to be moved and a bridge had to be rebuilt.

== Services ==
The station is served by S-Bahn lines S3, S4, S5 and S6. Intercity and regional trains run past on the Main Weser tracks, which have no platforms at Messe.
