= Oberursel station =

Railway station in Oberursel, Germany

Oberursel (Taunus)
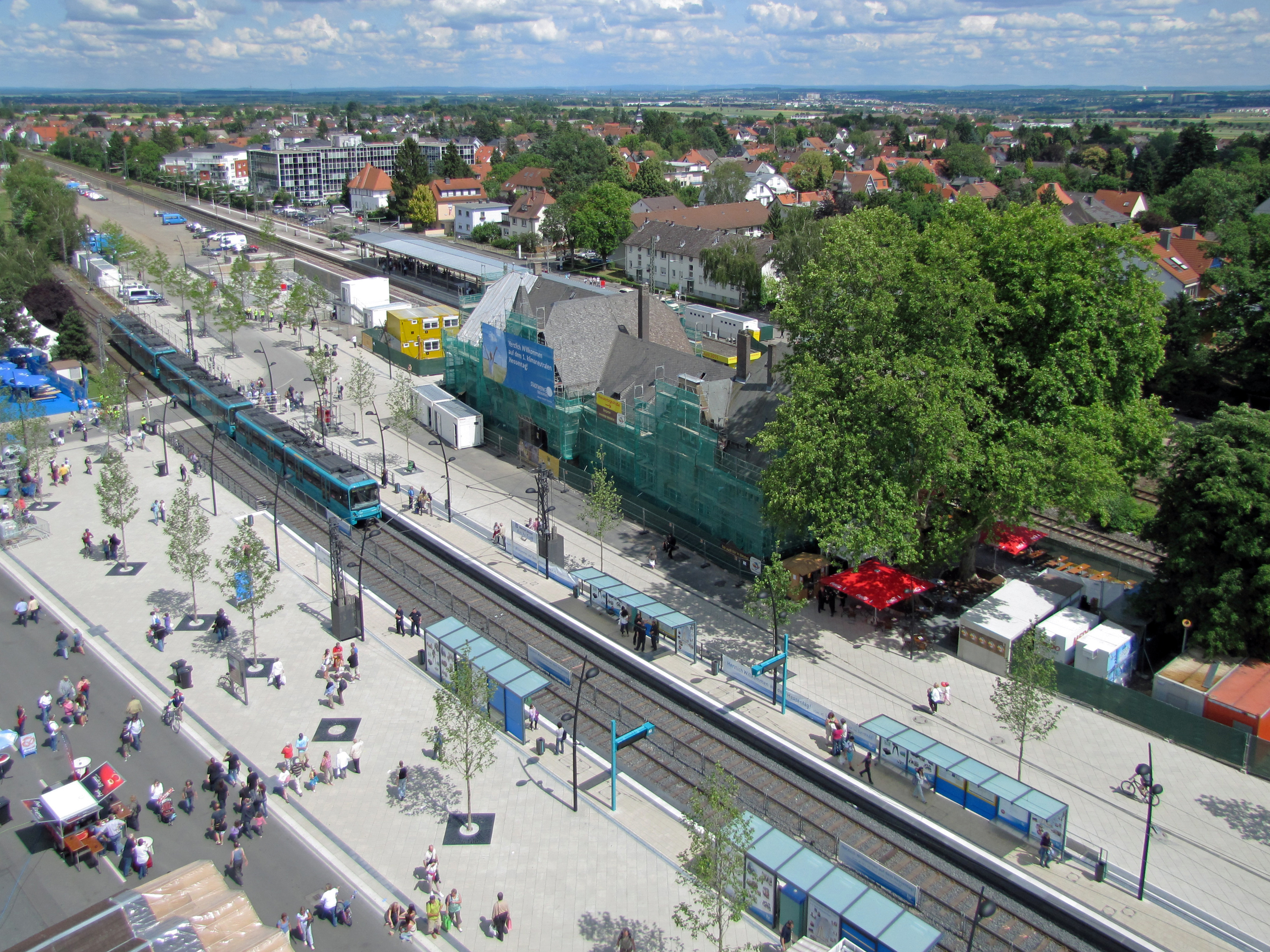
- U-Bahn stop (bottom) and railway station (top) during Hessentag 2011

General information
- Location: Platz des 17 Juni 1, Oberursel (Taunus), Hesse; Germany
- Coordinates: 50°11′56″N 8°35′18″E
- Lines: Homburg Railway; Line A (U-Bahn)
- Platforms: 2

Construction
- Accessible: Yes

Other information
- Station code: 4702
- DS100 code: FOU
- IBNR: 8004596
- Category: 4
- Fare zone: : 5126
- Website: www.bahnhof.de

History
- Opened: 1860

Passengers
- about 11,000

Services
Preceding station	Rhine-Main S-Bahn	Following station
Bad Homburg towards Friedrichsdorf	S5 (Rhine-Main S-Bahn)	Oberursel-Stierstadt towards Südbahnhof
Preceding station	Frankfurt U-Bahn	Following station
Oberursel Stadtmitte towards Oberursel Hohemark	U3	Bommersheim towards Südbahnhof
Location
- Location within Hesse

Oberursel (Taunus) station is a station on S-Bahn line S5 in Oberursel (Taunus), near Frankfurt am Main, Germany on the Homburg line. The former Mountain Railway (German: Gebirgsbahn) ran from the station to Hohemark; it is now part of U-Bahn line U3.

== History ==
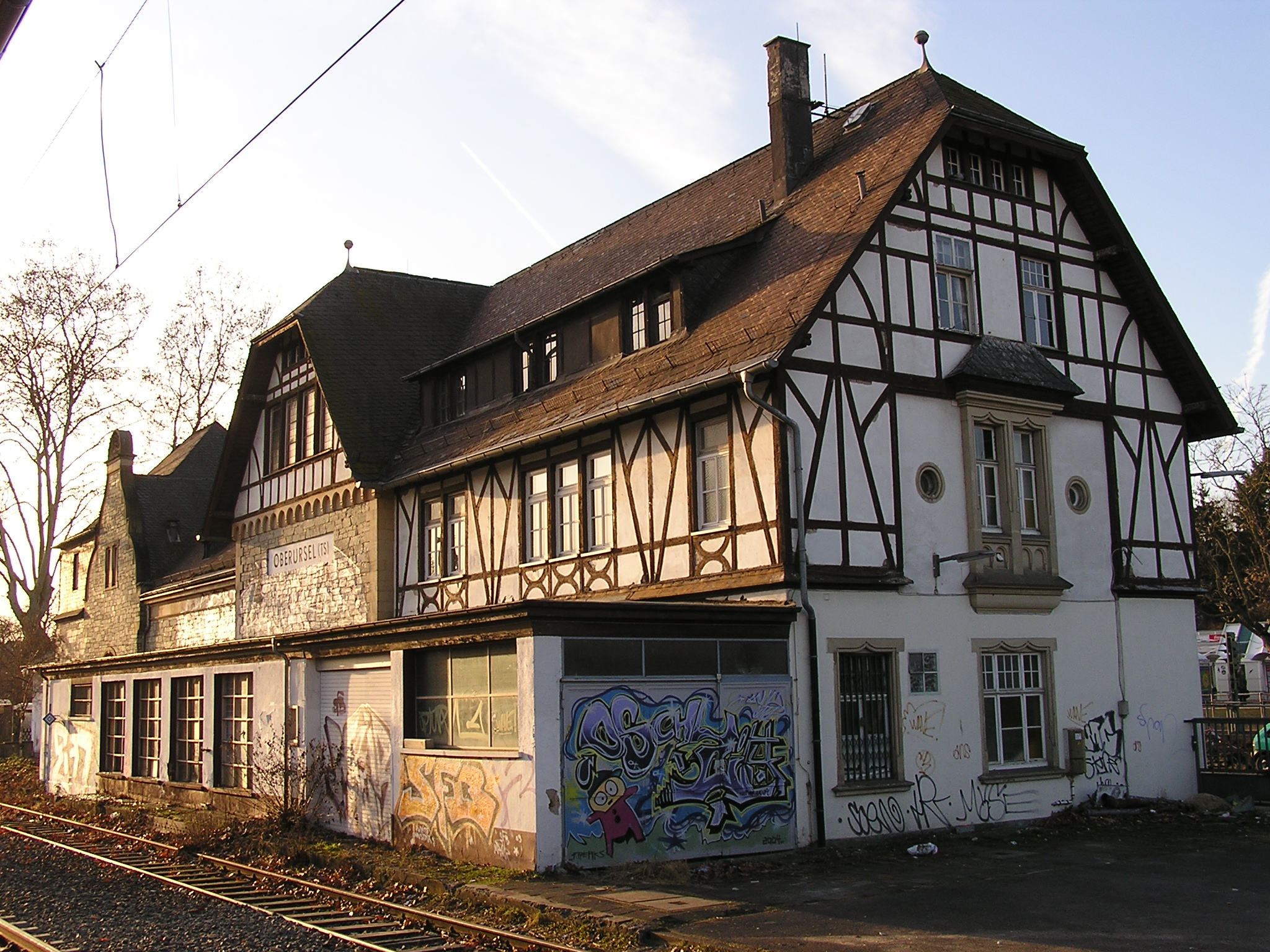
Entrance building, track side (2008, before reconstruction)

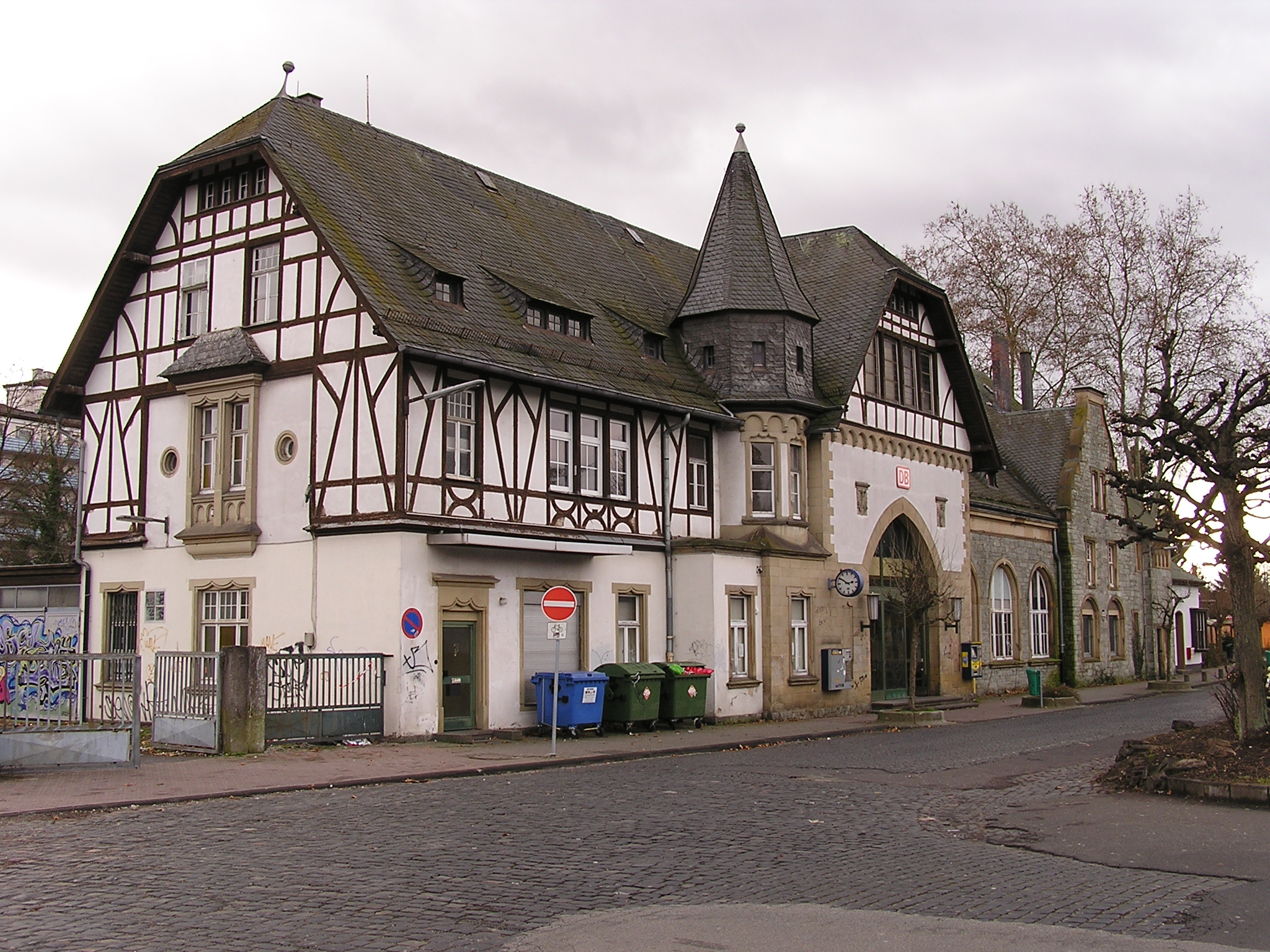
Entrance building, street side (2008, before reconstruction)

The Homburg Railway was opened in 1860 to connect Frankfurt and Bad Homburg, replacing a horse-drawn omnibus line established in 1850. Oberursel station was opened with the line. The station was initially west of the crossing of the Frankfurter Landstraße; later the existing station was built east of the road.

In 1901 the line from Homburg to Friedberg was extended to Friedrichsdorf. At the personal request of the Emperor, the capacity of the entire route from Frankfurt to Friedberg and Friedrichsdorf was increased, including the duplication of the line from 1907 to 1910.

In 1899 the standard gauge Mountain Railway was opened to Hohemark, with steam-hauled freight and passenger trains. A connection was built to the Homburg Railway in the eastern part of the station. In 1910 this was followed by a light railway from Heddernheim, which connected the Mountain Railway with the Frankfurt tram network.

From 1968 the line from Frankfurt to Hohemark was operated as premetro line 24, later renamed line A3. In 1978 Oberursel became the terminal of U-Bahn line U3. The line, which had been single-track, was duplicated for its incorporation in the U-Bahn. The link to the Homburg Railway was used for the delivery of the U-Bahn’s original U2 rollingstock.

On 27 September 1970, the line via Oberursel and Bad Homburg to Friedrichsdorf was electrified. In 1974 the Frankfurt Transport Authority (Frankfurter Verkehrsverbund, FVV) was established with an S-Bahn-like network connecting Frankfurt Hauptbahnhof with Friedrichsdorf, with the route number of R5. In 1978, this operation was redesignated as an S-Bahn and renumbered with its current designation of S5. Since the Taunusbahn became part of the FVV in 1993, trains have run on it to Frankfurt Hauptbahnhof, stopping in Oberursel, but not at Stierstadt or Weißkirchen.

== Current situation ==
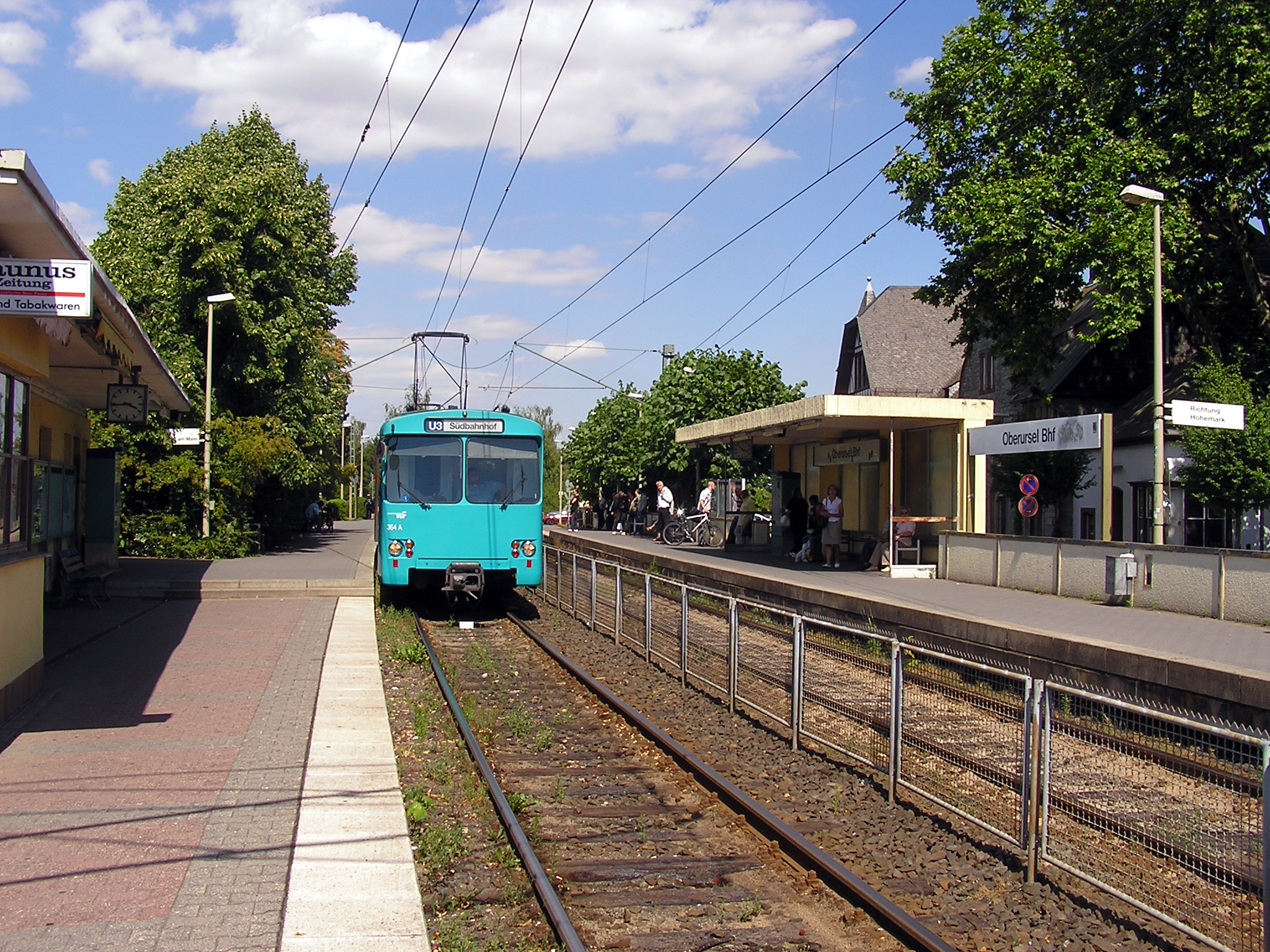
U-Bahn station (2008, before reconstruction)

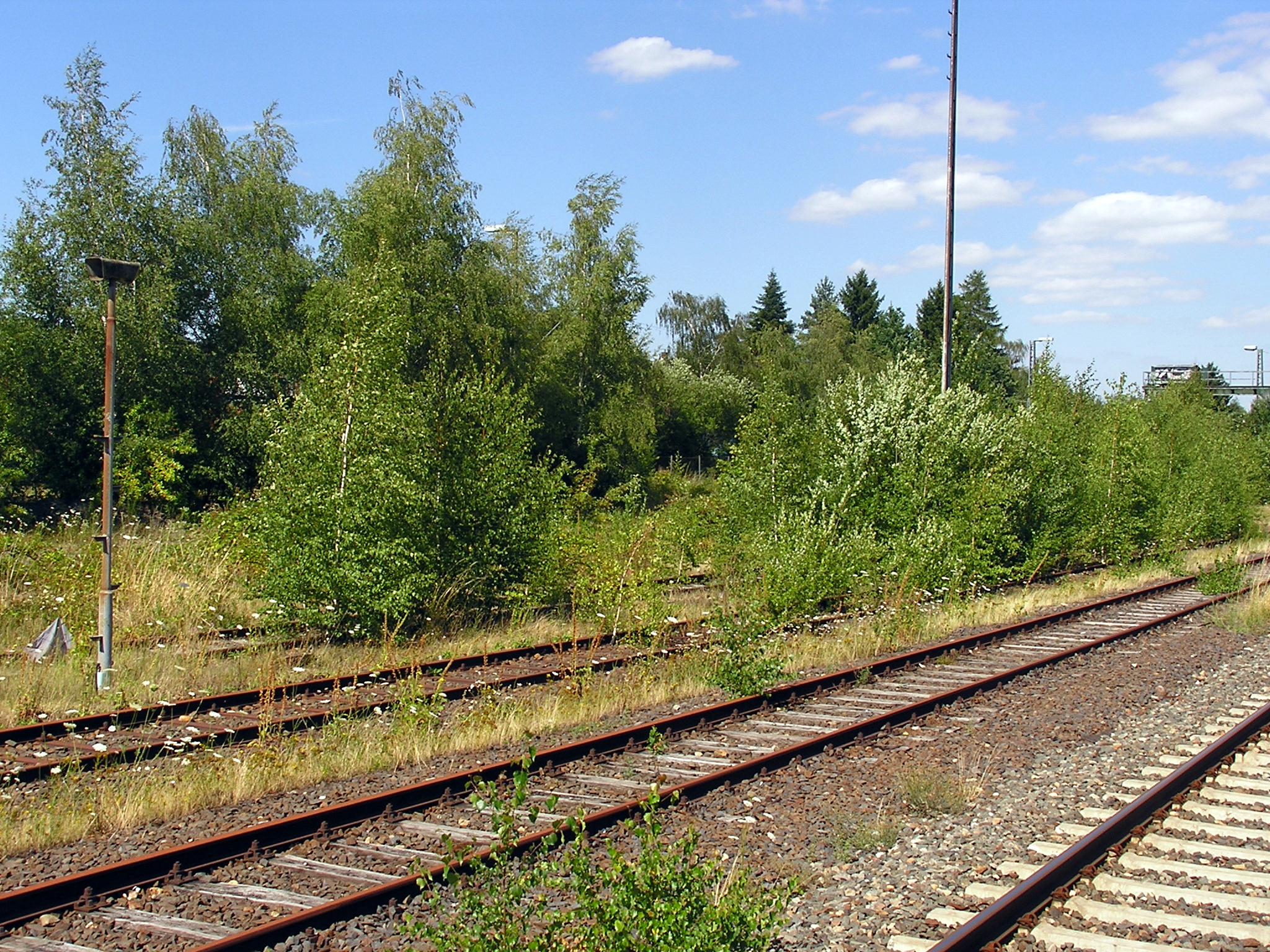
Abandoned freight yard

Only two of its many original buildings still exist: the former station master’s house and the entrance building. The Homburg line station now has only two tracks on either side of an island platform. The tracks in the spacious freight yard are now abandoned and largely overgrown, with 200 species of wild flower identified. Parts of the area are used for a parking lot. It is planned to build a new neighborhood on the area. The connection to the U-Bahn network is now blocked by a GSM-R mast. The U-Bahn station consists of a twin-track station with provision for reversal before the line branches off towards Hohemark.

== Services ==
The station is served by S-Bahn line S5 every 30 minutes (every 15 minutes during peak hour). During peak hour it is also served by RB15 regional services on the Taunusbahn (High Taunus line to Usingen/Brandoberndorf). U-Bahn line U3 stops at Oberursel station every 15 minutes during peak hour and near-peak times and every 30 minutes at off-peak times. Additionally, three town bus lines and four intercity bus lines, including two express bus lines, stop near the station.
