= Frankfurt-Rödelheim station =

Railway station in Frankfurt, Germany

Frankfurt Rödelheim
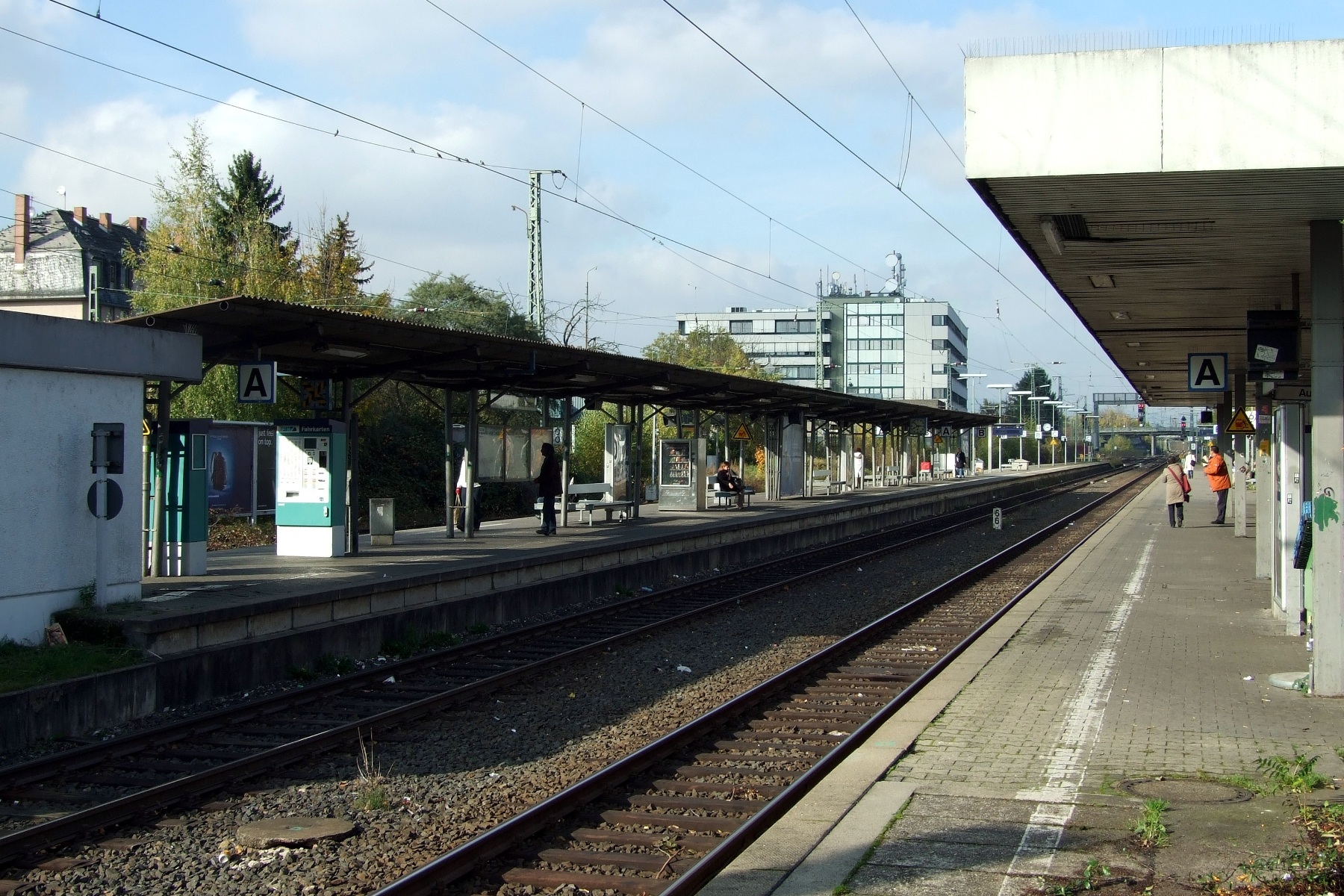
- Station platforms 1, 2, and 3 (from right to left), looking north

General information
- Location: Baruch-Baschwitz-Platz 33, Frankfurt-Rödelheim, Hesse; Germany
- Coordinates: 50°7′28″N 8°36′26″E
- Lines: Homburg Railway; Kronberg Railway
- Platforms: 3

Construction
- Accessible: Yes

Other information
- Station code: 1877
- DS100 code: FRH
- IBNR: 8002052
- Category: 3
- Fare zone: : 5004
- Website: www.bahnhof.de

History
- Opened: 1860

Services
Preceding station	Rhine-Main S-Bahn	Following station
Eschborn-Süd towards Bad Soden	S3 (Rhine-Main S-Bahn)	Frankfurt West towards Südbahnhof
Eschborn-Süd towards Kronberg	S4 (Rhine-Main S-Bahn)	Frankfurt West towards Südbahnhof
Oberursel-Weißkirchen/Steinbach towards Friedrichsdorf	S5 (Rhine-Main S-Bahn)	Frankfurt West towards Südbahnhof
Location
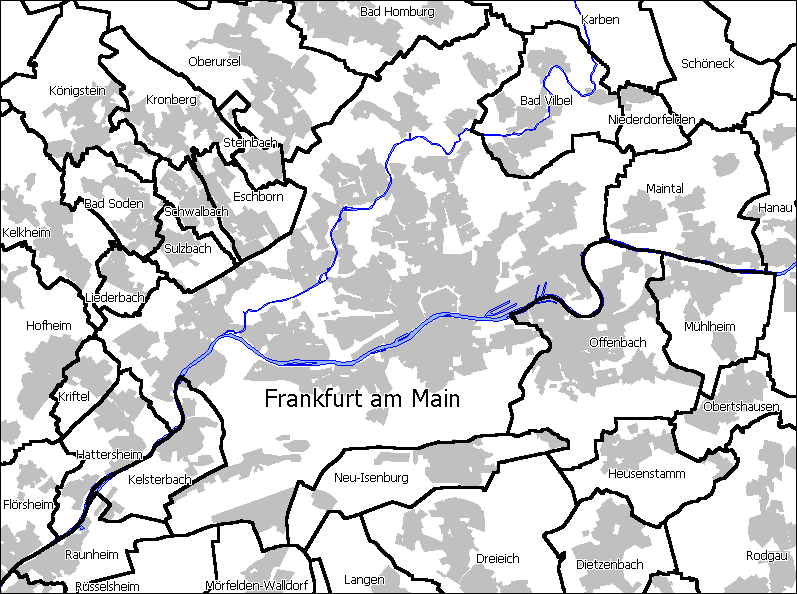
- Location within Frankfurt am Main Location within Hesse Location within Germany Location within Europe

Frankfurt-Rödelheim station is a regional and S-Bahn station in western Frankfurt am Main, Germany on the Homburg line, in the district of Rödelheim. The Kronberg line branches off the Homburg line north of the station. The junction with the Rebstock curve of the former Bad Nauheim–Wiesbaden line (Bäderbahn) is south of the station. The station connects with several bus lines.

== History ==
=== Old station ===
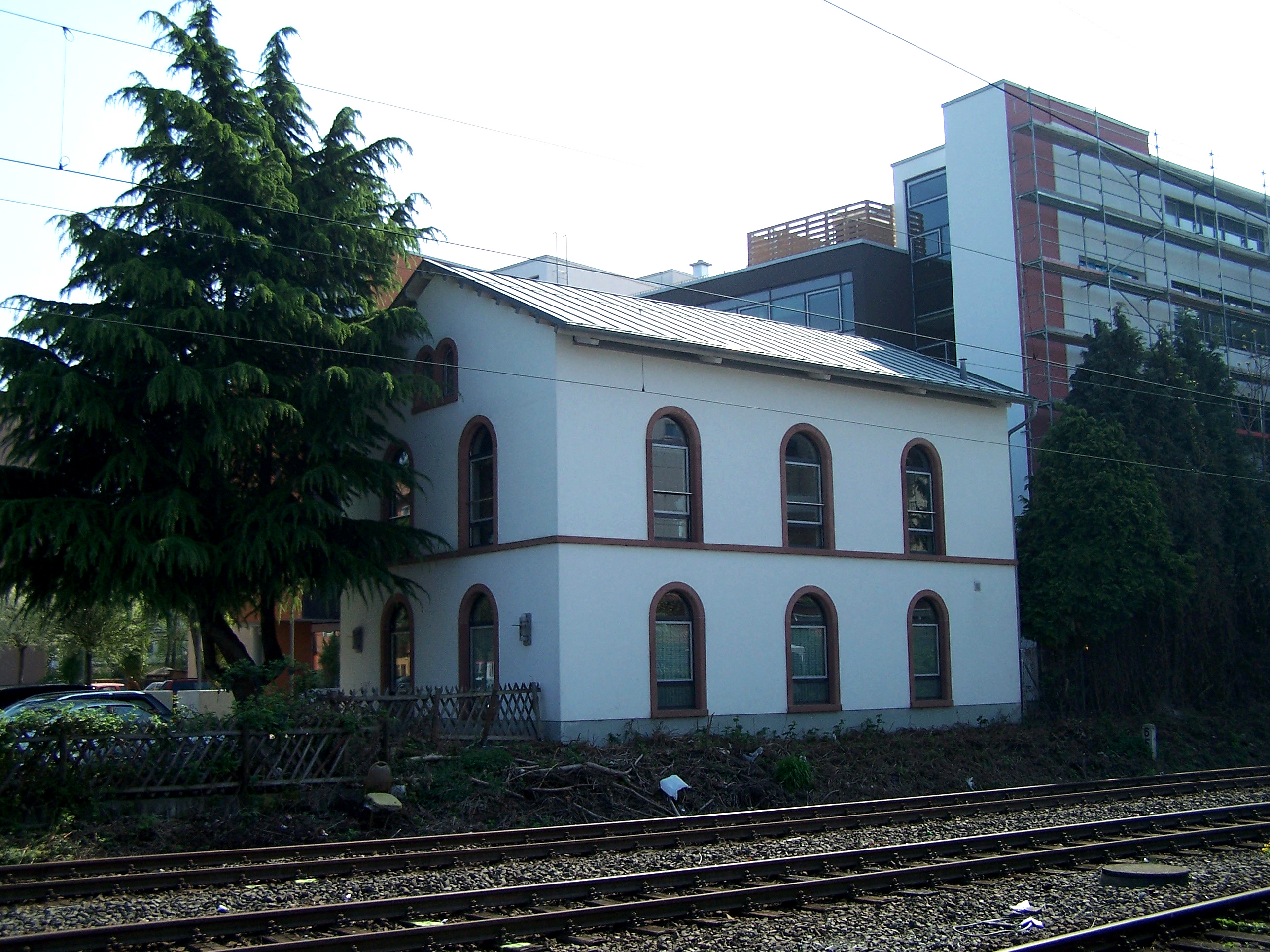
Original 1860 station, abandoned in 1874

The Homburg Railway was opened in 1860 to connect Frankfurt and Bad Homburg, replacing a horse-drawn omnibus line established in 1850. Rödelheim station was opened with the line. Originally, the line between the Main-Weser line and Rödelheim passed through the Rebstockgelände ("vineyards") to the west of Frankfurt. The current route between Rödelheim and the Main-Weser line at Bockenheim station (now Frankfurt West station) replaced the old line in 1884. In 1874, the Kronberg Railway was originally opened as a single track via Eschborn to Kronberg im Taunus. The old station was closed and the station moved to its present location.

=== New station ===
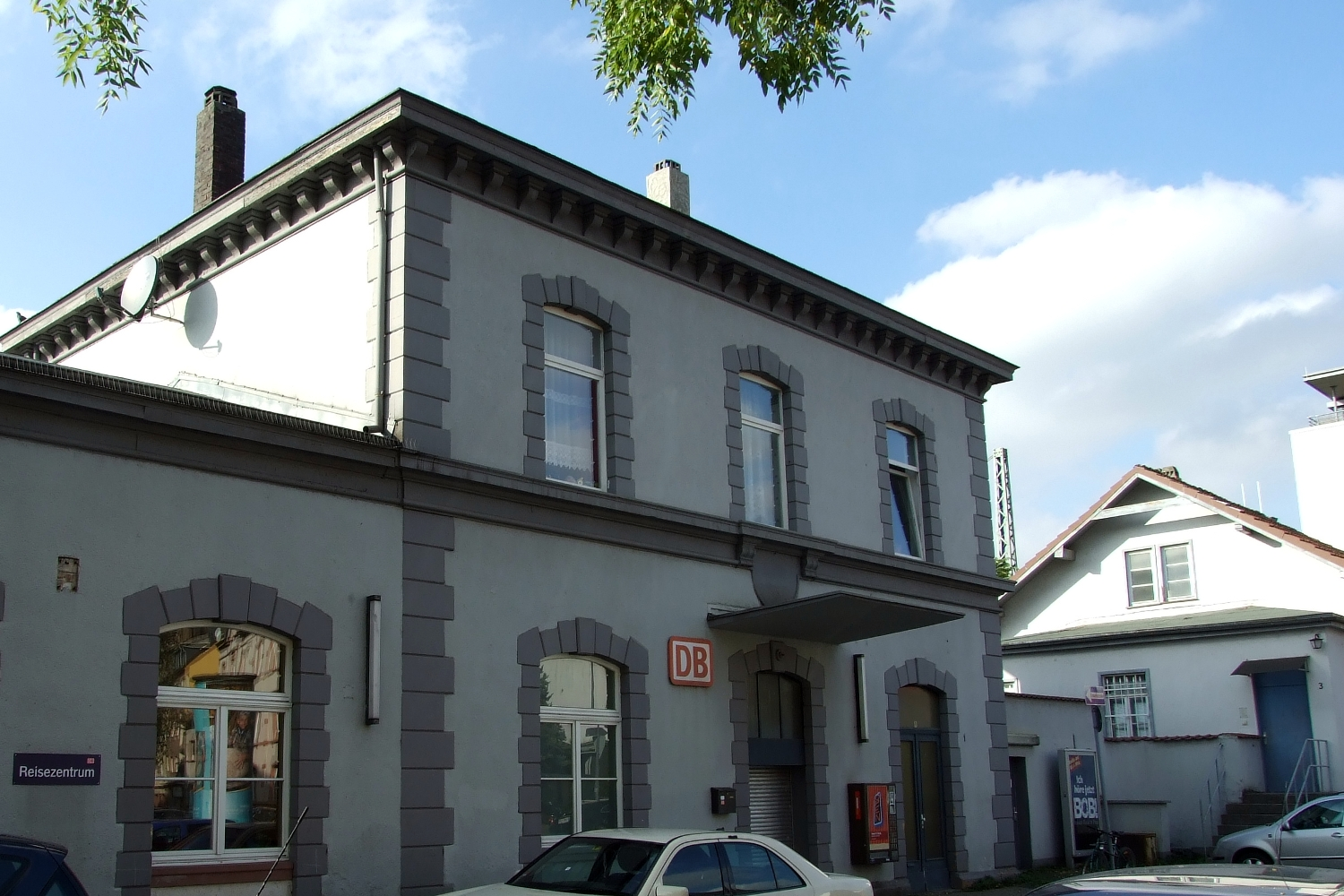
New station, opened in 1874

In 1901 the line from Homburg to Friedberg was extended to Friedrichsdorf. At the personal request of the Emperor, the capacity of the entire route from Frankfurt to Friedberg and Friedrichsdorf was increased, including the duplication of the line from 1907 to 1910. On 1 September 1905, a link was opened through the Frankfurt vineyards (Rebstockgelände), initially only for freight and special trains. It branched off the Homburg line south of Rödelheim station towards Höchst and was used from 1908 by passenger trains on the Bad Nauheim–Wiesbaden line (Bäderbahn, Bath Railway), the line between the spa (German: Bad) towns of Wiesbaden, Bad Homburg and Bad Nauheim. A link between this line and Frankfurt Hauptbahnhof was opened on 15 March 1927 and is still used by trains connecting to the High Taunus line (Taunusbahn) to the north of Bad Homburg. Each of these lines was double track; only the Kronberg branch was single track. With the incorporation of Rödelheim into Frankfurt in 1910 the station changed its name to Frankfurt-Rödelheim. The extension of the electrified tram line was opened to Rödelheim station in 1911.

From the summer of 1954 there was a regular interval timetable on the lines to Kronberg and Bad Homburg, with trains running every half-hour. As the Rebstock curve from Homburg towards Höchst was obsolete, it was demolished in 1963 during construction of the A5 motorway. Hence the line from the station to Nidda bridge junction was reduced from four tracks back to two tracks. The connecting curve is now single track.

On 27 September 1970 both the Homburg and Kronberg line were electrified.

In 1974 the Frankfurt Transport Authority (Frankfurter Verkehrsverbund, FVV) was established with an S-Bahn-like network connecting Frankfurt Hauptbahnhof with Bad Soden, Kronberg and Friedrichsdorf, with the routes numbered as R3, R4 and R5. In 1978, these operations were redesignated as an S-Bahn and renumbered with their current designations of S3, S4 and S5. With the establishment of the S-Bahn some of the Kronberg line was duplicated. Since the Taunusbahn became part of the FVV in 1993, trains have run on it to Frankfurt Hauptbahnhof, stopping in Rödelheim. These services run via the Rebstock curve, while the S-Bahn services run via Frankfurt West. The tram service was closed in 1978 and replaced by bus line 34.

Around this time, two level crossings at Westerbachstraße (south of the station) and Eschborner Landstraße (north of the station) were closed and replaced by a new underpass to the north.

== Current situation ==
The old Rödelheim station is now used as offices by a consulting firm. The original reception building of the new Rödelheim station is preserved and it includes a bakery. Three out of the six tracks that once existed remain in use. The station was extensively renovated in 2012, including the platforms, pedestrian tunnel and the addition of ramps and lifts for improved accessibility for wheelchair users and those with restricted mobility.

== Services ==
The station is served by S-Bahn lines S3, S4 and S5. It is also served by regional trains on SE15 services on the High Taunus line.
