= Frankfurt Messe =

Frankfurt Messe can refer to:

- Messe Frankfurt, the trade fair in Frankfurt
- Frankfurt Messe station, a station on the Rhine-Main S-Bahn
