= Bad Homburg station =

Railway station in Bad Homburg vor der Höhe, Germany

Bad Homburg
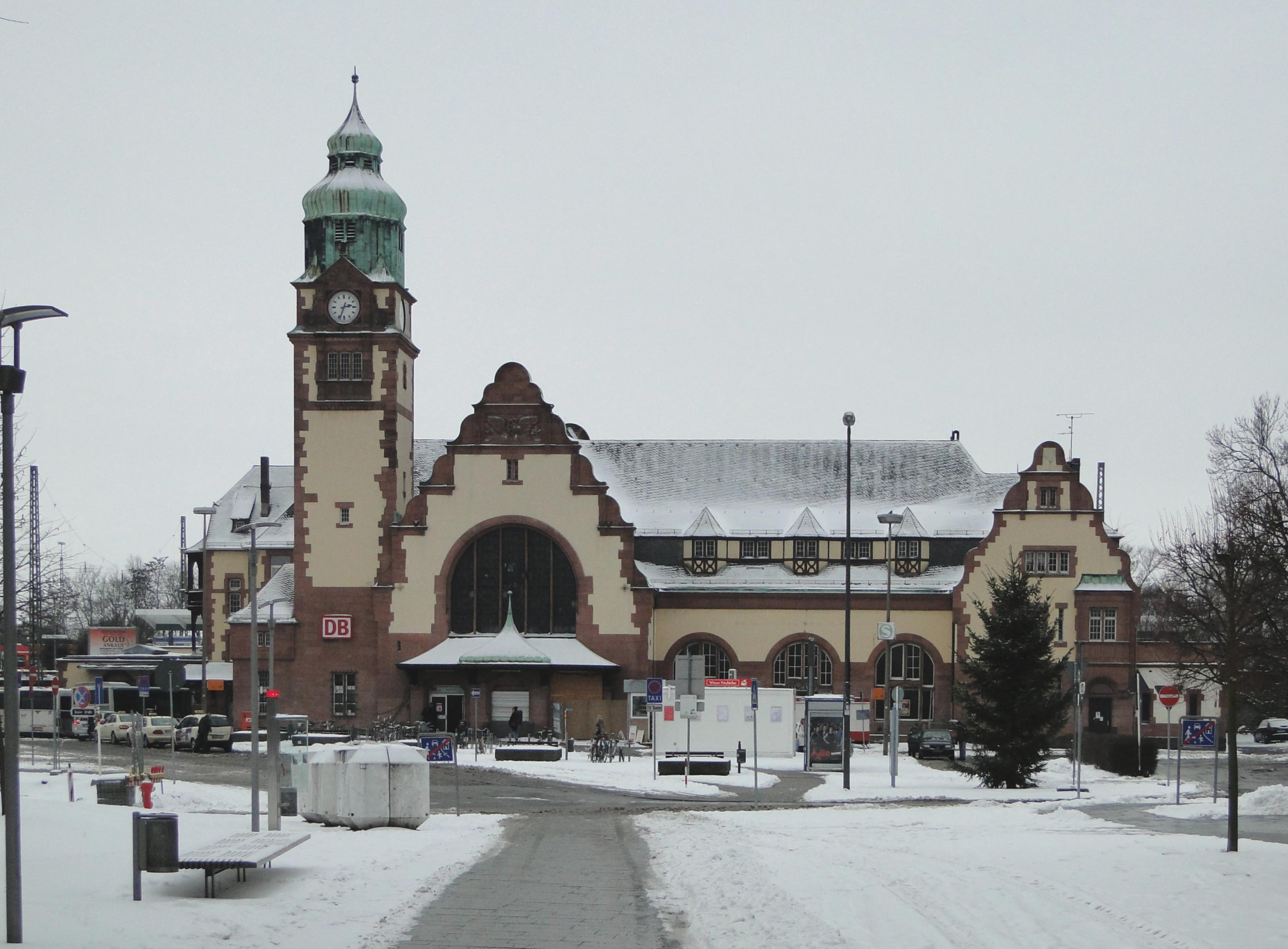
- Reception building

General information
- Location: Bahnhofsplatz 4 Bad Homburg, Hesse; Germany
- Coordinates: 50°13′12″N 08°37′16″E
- Lines: Homburg Railway (KBS 645.5); Taunusbahn (KBS 637)
- Platforms: 4 (and a former royal platform)

Construction
- Accessible: Yes
- Architect: Armin Wegner
- Architectural style: Renaissance revival

Other information
- Station code: 284
- DS100 code: FHO
- IBNR: 8000712
- Category: 3
- Fare zone: : 5101
- Website: bahnhof.de

History
- Opened: 26 October 1907

Passengers
- about 19,000

Services
Preceding station	DB Regio Mitte	Following station
Friedrichsdorf-Seulberg towards Brandoberndorf	RB 15	Oberursel towards Frankfurt (Main) Hbf
Preceding station	Rhine-Main S-Bahn	Following station
Friedrichsdorf-Seulberg towards Friedrichsdorf	S5 (Rhine-Main S-Bahn)	Oberursel towards Südbahnhof
Location
- Location within Hesse

Bad Homburg station is located in Bad Homburg, Hesse, Germany on the Homburg Railway and was opened on 26 October 1907. It is used by about 19,000 passengers each day.

== Historical background ==
The new through station in Bad Homburg replaced two older terminal stations. One of these stations was at the site of the present town hall and was the terminus of the line from Frankfurt am Main that was opened in 1860 by the Homburg Railways (German: Homburger Eisenbahn-Gesellschaft). In 1895 the Prussian state railways opened another terminus, called Homburg Neu (new) station, for the High Taunus line from Homburg via Friedrichsdorf to Usingen. This second station was between the lower end of the street of Louisenstraße and the current connection to the autobahn. The two stations were separated by a distance of 200 to 300 metres. They were connected via a track that was only used for shunting.

== The new station ==
Homburg was a popular palace of Emperor Wilhelm II. Thus the separation of rail services at Homburg’s two stations was not only operationally unsatisfactory, it also did not meet the Emperor’s ceremonial needs. Therefore, a new through station with a separate building for royalty was built between 1905 and 1907, which connected the two railway lines leading to Homburg to each other. It cost just under 4.7 million marks. It was called Homburg station and renamed Bad Homburg station in 1912 when the town was similarly renamed.

The station building is very representative of Renaissance Revival architecture and has an asymmetric design. The building was designed by government architect Armin Wegner, although the emperor repeatedly intervened in its design.

== Operation ==
Bad Homburg station was used by S-Bahn S5 services running between Frankfurt South and Friedrichsdorf, and by Hessische Landesbahn-operated RB 15 services running on the Taunusbahn between Frankfurt and Friedrichsdorf and Brandoberndorf in the 2026 timetable.

Outside the station building is a bus station used by all Bad Homburg bus routes and most regional bus routes.

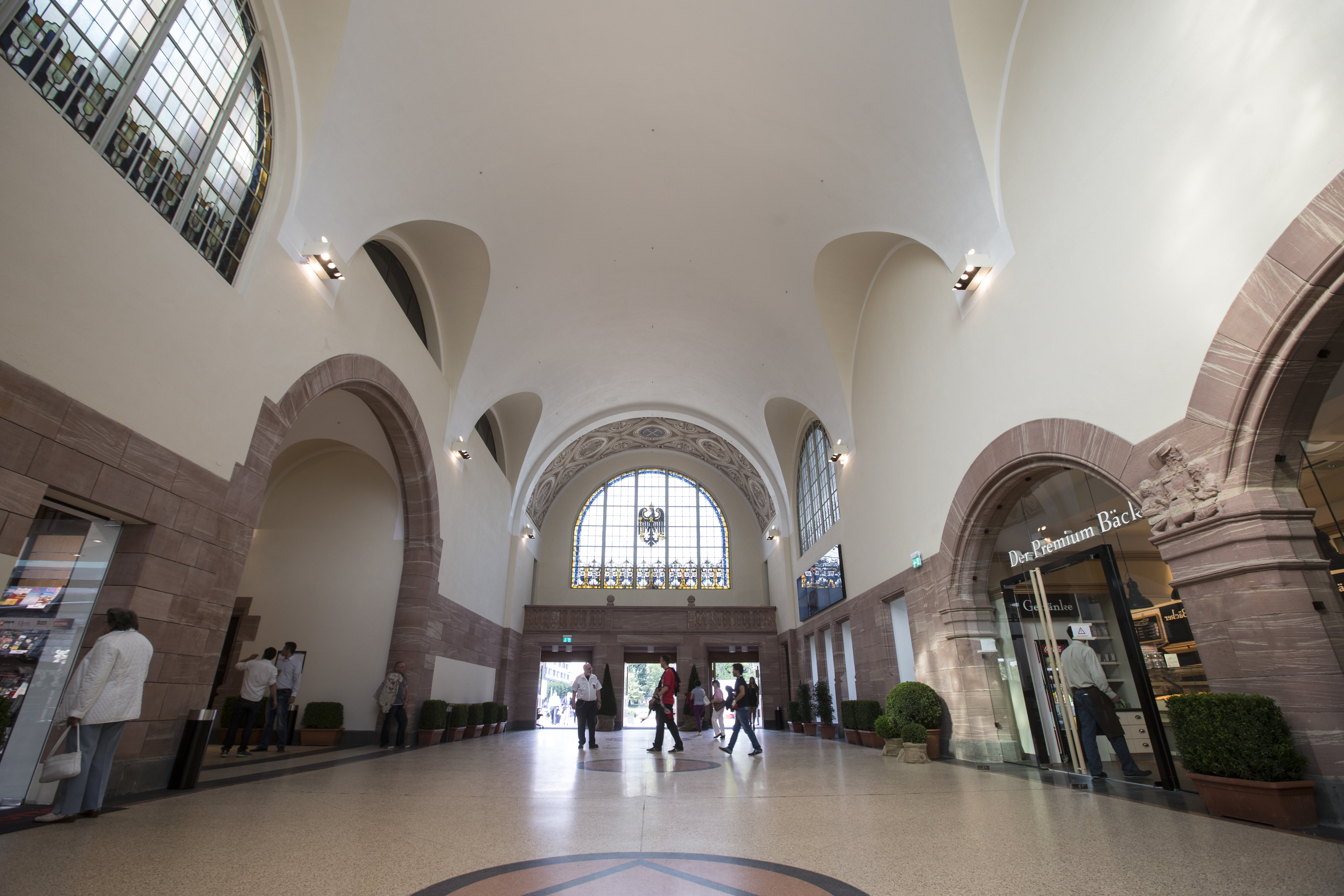
Interior

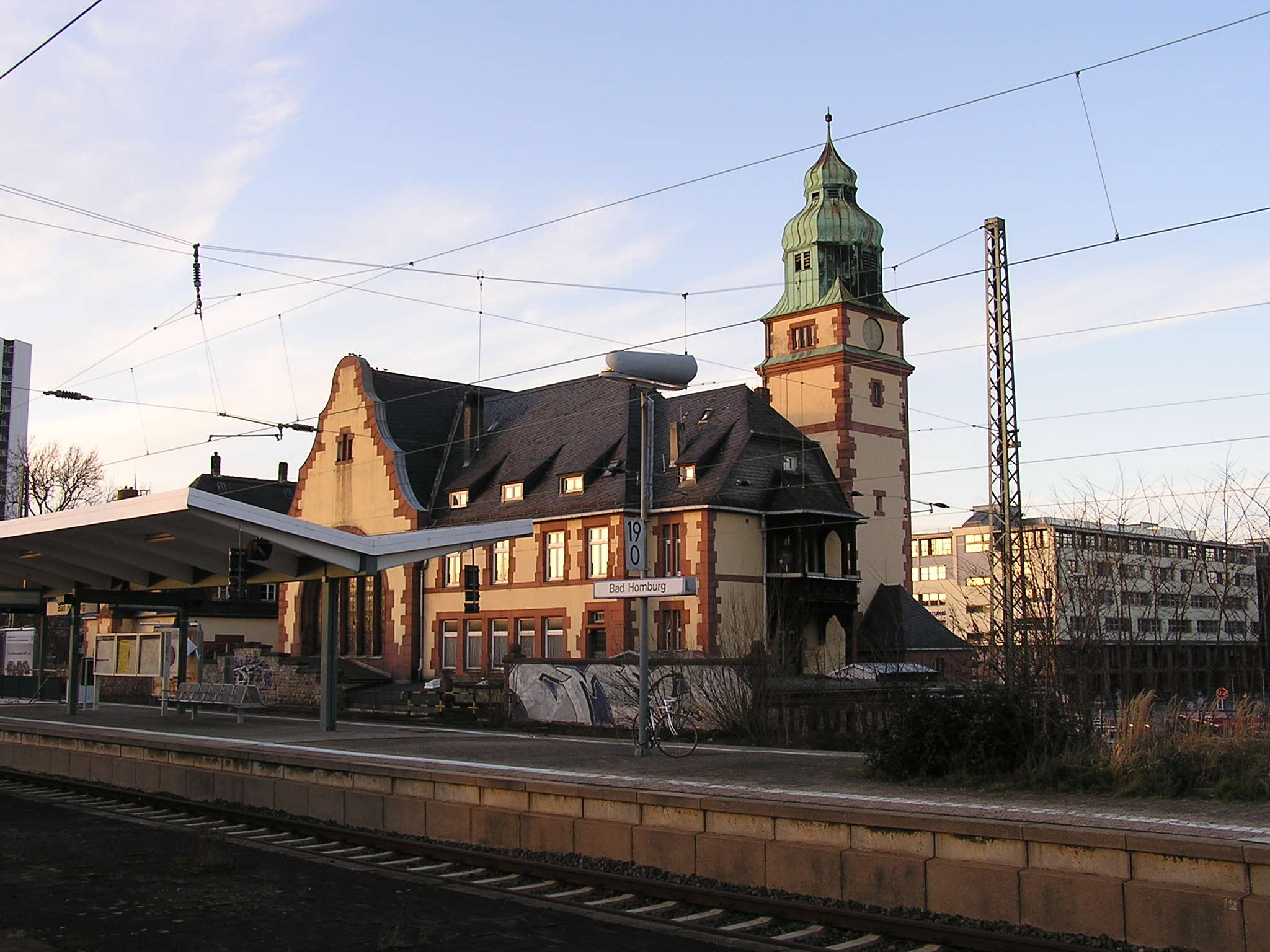
Station

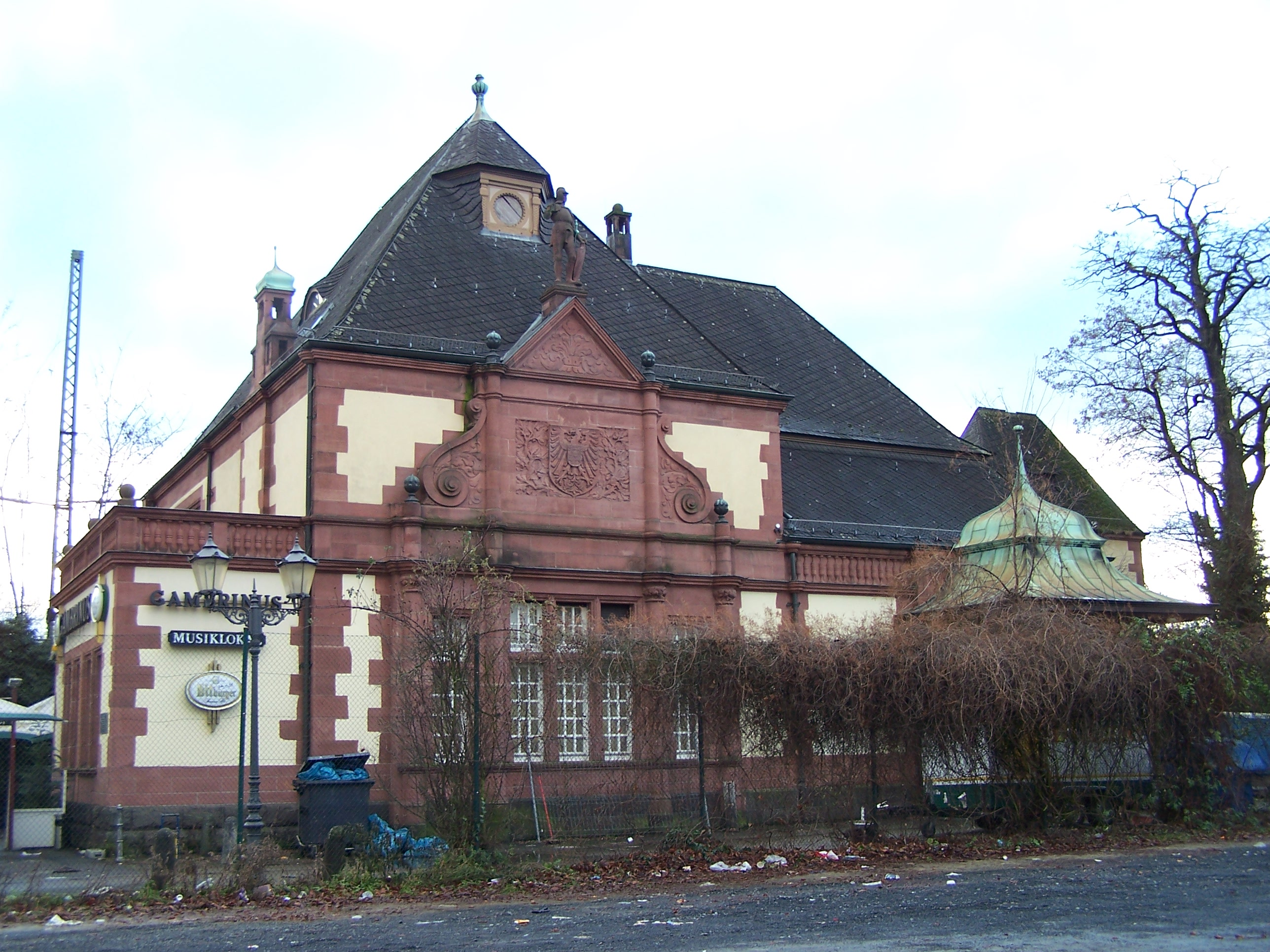
Former separate station building for royalty ("Fürstenbahnhof")

== Future ==
It is planned to extend line U2 of the Frankfurt U-Bahn from Bad Homburg Gonzenheim to Bad Homburg station. A project known as Regionaltangente West (Regional tangent west) will establish a north–south line through Frankfurt Airport Regional station by 2030, connecting with the Bad Homburg station.
