= S5 (Rhine-Main S-Bahn) =

Rail service in germany

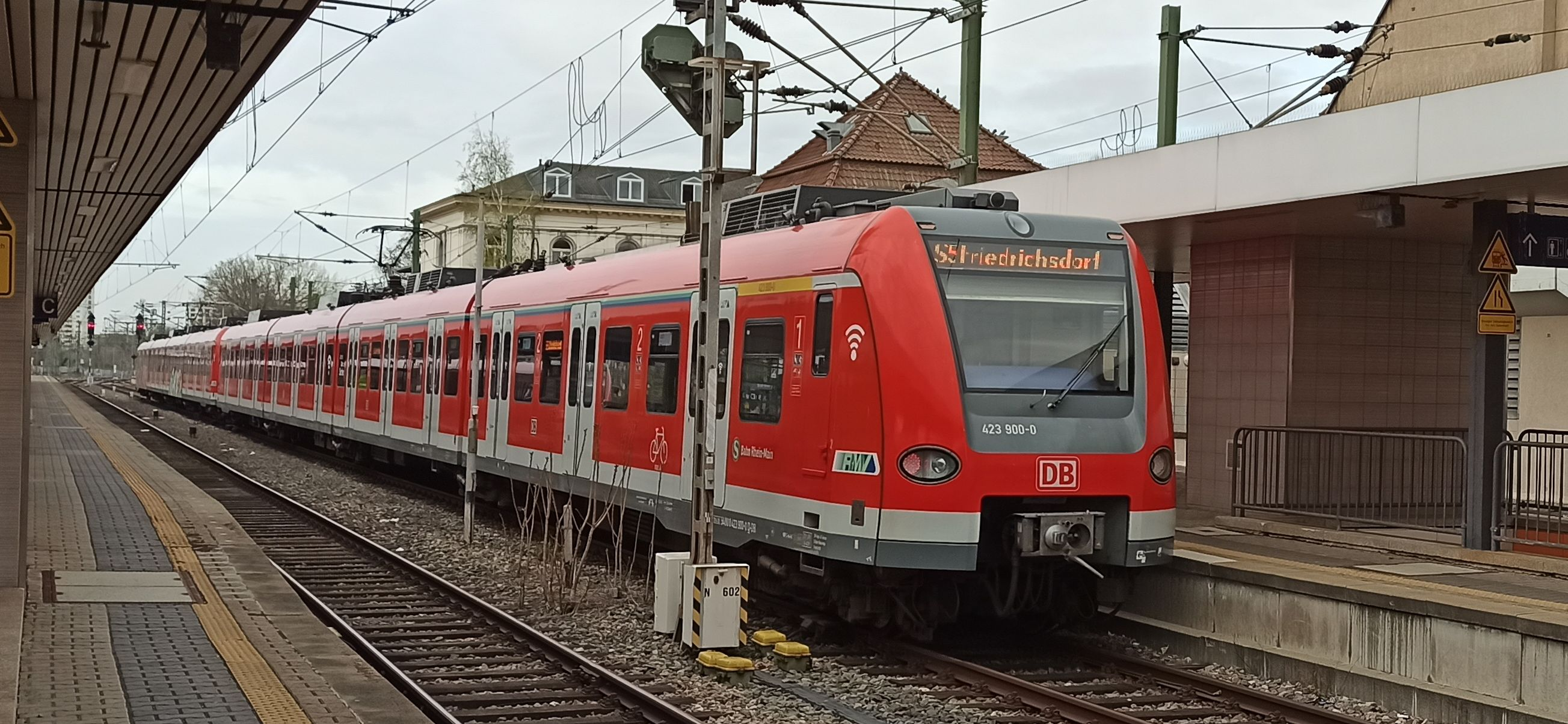
- S5 to Friedrichsdorf at Frankfurt (Main) Süd train station

Overview
- Status: Operational
- Owner: Rhein-Main-Verkehrsverbund
- Line number: 5
- Locale: Frankfurt Rhine-Main
- Termini: Friedrichsdorf; Frankfurt Süd
- Stations: 17

Service
- Type: Rapid transit, Commuter rail
- System: S-Bahn Rhein-Main
- Services: Homburg Railway, Citytunnel Frankfurt
- Route number: 645.5
- Operator(s): DB Regio
- Depot(s): Frankfurt Hbf
- Rolling stock: DBAG Class 423

History
- Opened: 28 May 1978

Technical
- Line length: 28.9 km (18.0 mi)
- Track gauge: 1,435 mm (4 ft 8 1/2 in) standard gauge
- Electrification: Overhead line

The S5 service of the S-Bahn Rhein-Main system bearing the KBS (German scheduled railway route) number 645.5

== Routes ==
=== Homburg Railway ===
The Homburg Railway connects Frankfurt Central Station with Friedrichsdorf, via Bad Homburg. It was opened on 10 September 1860 and electrified on 26 September 1970. S-Bahn services commenced on the line on 25 September 1977.

=== City tunnel ===
The city tunnel is an underground, pure S-Bahn route used by almost all services (except for the S7 service which terminates at the central station).

== History ==
Year	Stations	Route
1974 (R5)	8	Friedrichsdorf – Frankfurt Hbf
1978	11 (+3)	Friedrichsdorf – Hauptwache
1983	12 (+1)	Friedrichsdorf – Konstablerwache
1990	16 (+4)	Friedrichsdorf – Stresemannallee
1997	15 (-1)	Friedrichsdorf – Frankfurt Süd
1999	17 (+2)	Friedrichsdorf – Frankfurt Süd

The S5 was one of the first six services of the Rhine-Main S-Bahn system. In a prior test operation it ran between Friedrichsdorf and Frankfurt Central Station. The service was then called R5 where the letter "R" stands for regional. After the opening of the Frankfurt Citytunnel the service was renamed to S5 and extended to the new Hauptwache underground station. Further extensions of the tunnel followed in 1983 (Konstablerwache) and 1990 (Ostendstraße and Lokalbahnhof) so that the Südbahnhof (South station) became the service's eastern terminal.

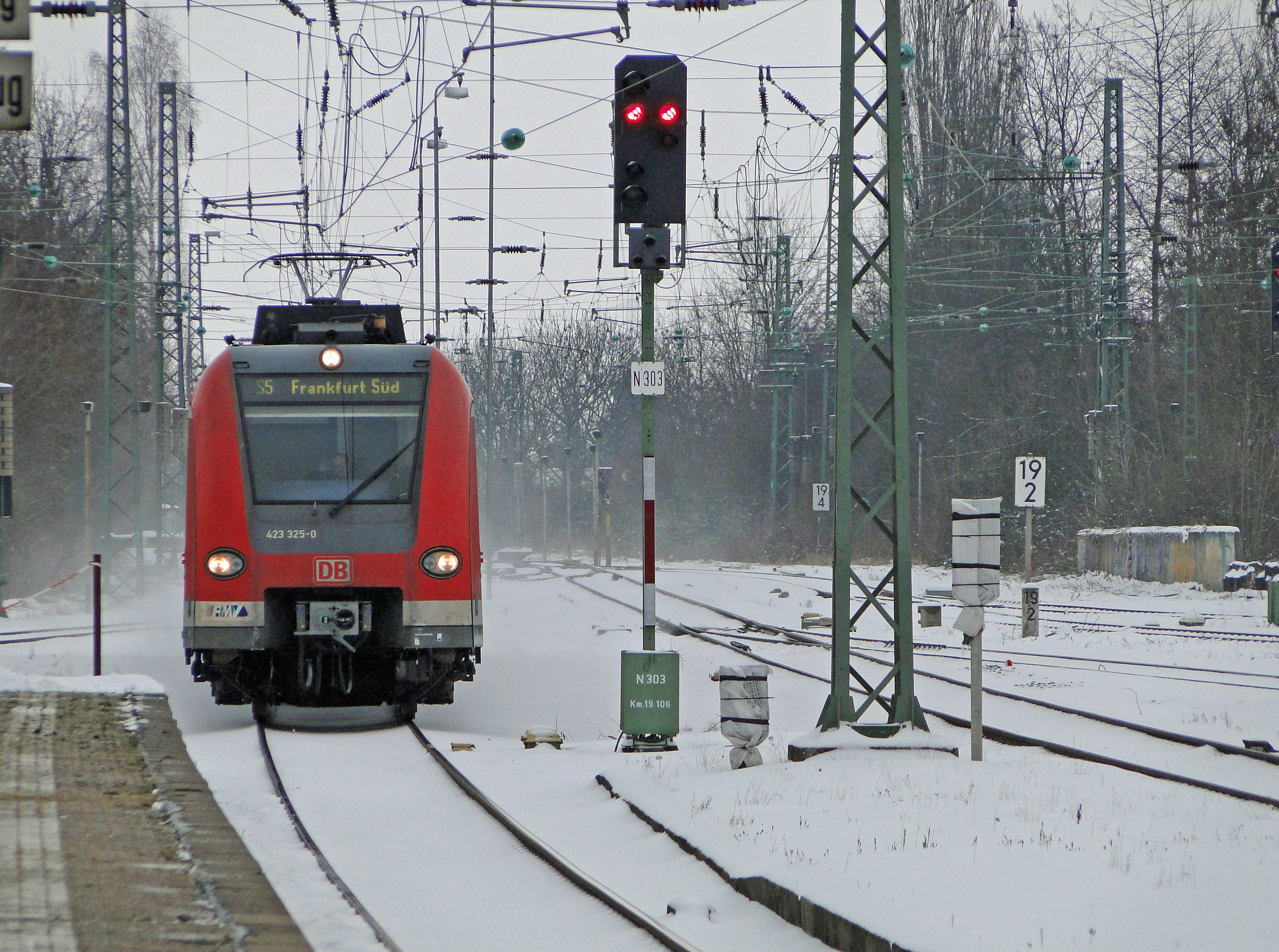
S5 at Bad Homburg station

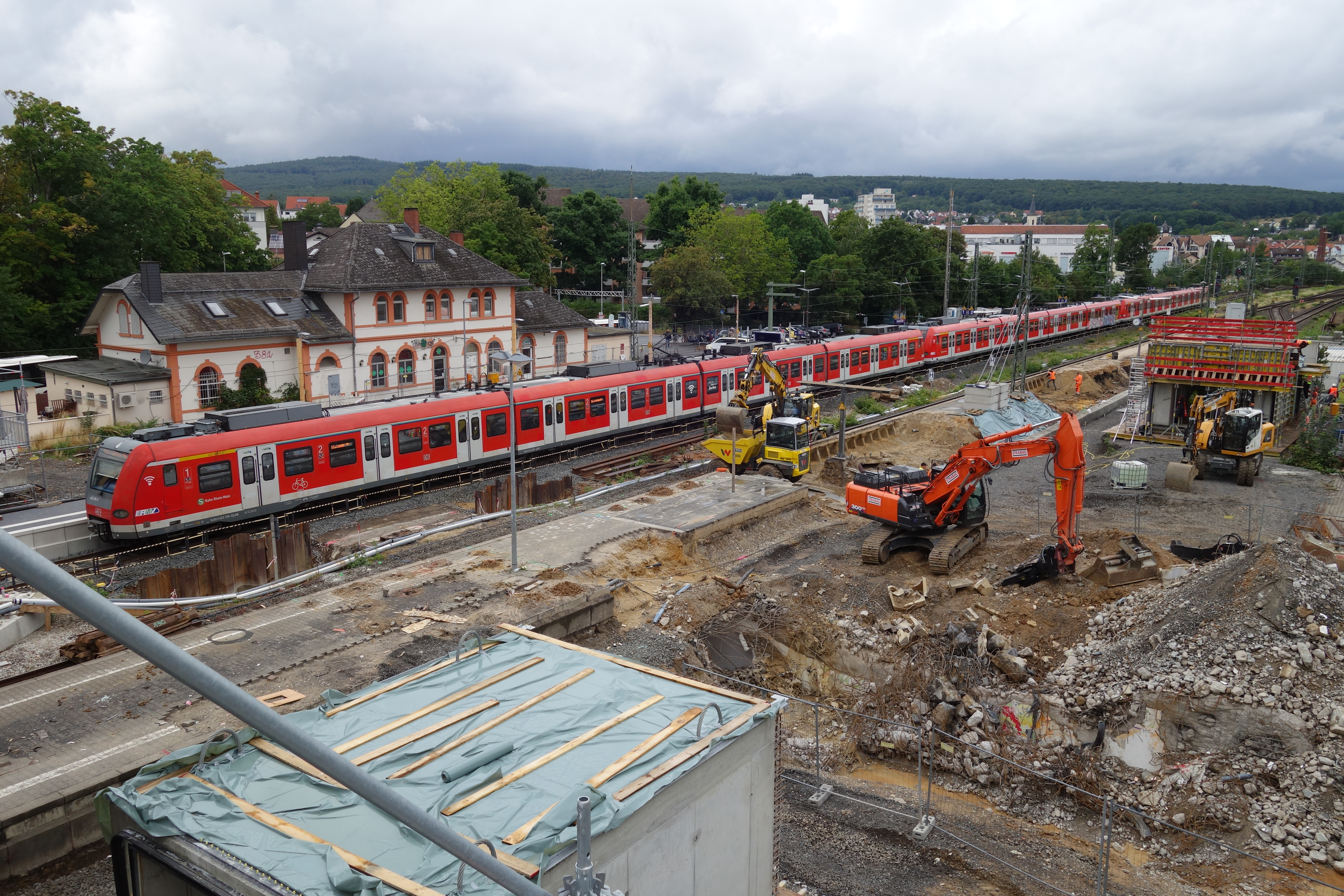
S5 at Friedrichsdorf station during modernization 2023

== Operation ==
1. Friedrichsdorf – Frankfurt Süd
2. Bad Homburg – Frankfurt Süd

S5 (Rhine-Main S-Bahn)		Journey time		Station	Transfer	S-Bahn service since
1	2					
=== Hochtaunuskreis ===
		0		Friedrichsdorf		1978
		3	+3	Friedrichsdorf-Seulberg		1978
		7	+4	Bad Homburg		1978
		11	+4	Oberursel	U3	1978
		13	+2	Oberursel-Stierstadt		1999
		15	+2	Oberursel-Weißkirchen/Steinbach		1978
=== Frankfurt am Main ===
		19	+4	Frankfurt-Rödelheim	S3 (Rhine-Main S-Bahn) S4 (Rhine-Main S-Bahn)	1978
		22	+3	Frankfurt West	S3 (Rhine-Main S-Bahn) S4 (Rhine-Main S-Bahn) S6 (Rhine-Main S-Bahn)	1978
		24	+2	Frankfurt Messe	S3 (Rhine-Main S-Bahn) S4 (Rhine-Main S-Bahn) S6 (Rhine-Main S-Bahn)	1999
		26	+2	Frankfurt Galluswarte	S3 (Rhine-Main S-Bahn) S4 (Rhine-Main S-Bahn) S6 (Rhine-Main S-Bahn)	1978
		29	+3	Frankfurt Hbf (tief)	U4 U5	1978
		31	+2	Taunusanlage	S1 (Rhine-Main S-Bahn) S2 (Rhine-Main S-Bahn) S3 (Rhine-Main S-Bahn) S4 (Rhine-Main S-Bahn) S6 (Rhine-Main S-Bahn) S8 (Rhine-Main S-Bahn) S9 (Rhine-Main S-Bahn)	1978
		33	+2	Hauptwache	U1 U2 U3 U6 U7 U8	1978
		34	+1	Konstablerwache	U4 U5 U6 U7	1983
		36	+2	Ostendstraße	S1 (Rhine-Main S-Bahn) S2 (Rhine-Main S-Bahn) S3 (Rhine-Main S-Bahn) S4 (Rhine-Main S-Bahn) S6 (Rhine-Main S-Bahn) S8 (Rhine-Main S-Bahn) S9 (Rhine-Main S-Bahn)	1990
		38	+2	Frankfurt Lokalbahnhof	S3 (Rhine-Main S-Bahn) S4 (Rhine-Main S-Bahn) S6 (Rhine-Main S-Bahn)	1990
		39	+1	Frankfurt South Station	U1 U2 U3 U8	1990
