= Frankfurt Galluswarte station =

Railway station in Frankfurt, Germany

Frankfurt (Main) Galluswarte
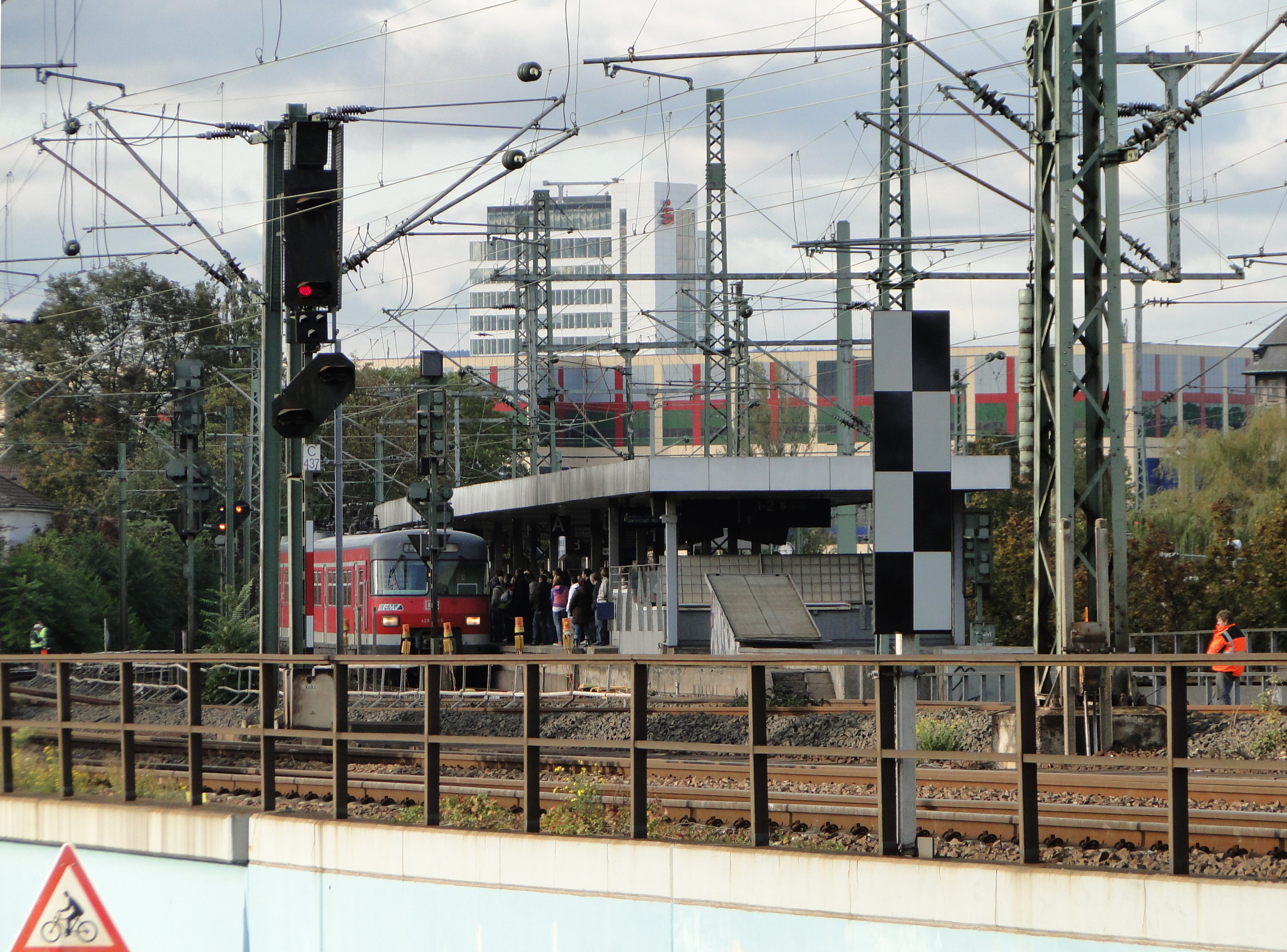

General information
- Location: Mainzer Landstr. 232; Frankfurt, Hesse; Germany
- Coordinates: 50°6′16″N 8°38′39″E
- Owner: Deutsche Bahn
- Operator: DB Station&Service
- Lines: Homburg Railway; Main-Weser Railway
- Platforms: 2

Construction
- Accessible: Yes

Other information
- Station code: 1863
- DS100 code: FFGA
- IBNR: 8006690
- Category: 4
- Fare zone: : 5001
- Website: www.bahnhof.de

History
- Opened: 1978

Services
Preceding station	Rhine-Main S-Bahn	Following station
Messe towards Bad Soden	S3 (Rhine-Main S-Bahn)	Frankfurt Hbf (tief) towards Südbahnhof
Messe towards Kronberg	S4 (Rhine-Main S-Bahn)	Frankfurt Hbf (tief) towards Südbahnhof
Messe towards Friedrichsdorf	S5 (Rhine-Main S-Bahn)	Frankfurt Hbf (tief) towards Südbahnhof
Messe towards Friedberg (Hess)	S6 (Rhine-Main S-Bahn)	Frankfurt Hbf (tief) towards Darmstadt Hbf
Location

Frankfurt (Main) Galluswarte station (German: Bahnhof Frankfurt (Main) Galluswarte) is a railway station located in the Gallus district of Frankfurt, Germany.

== History ==
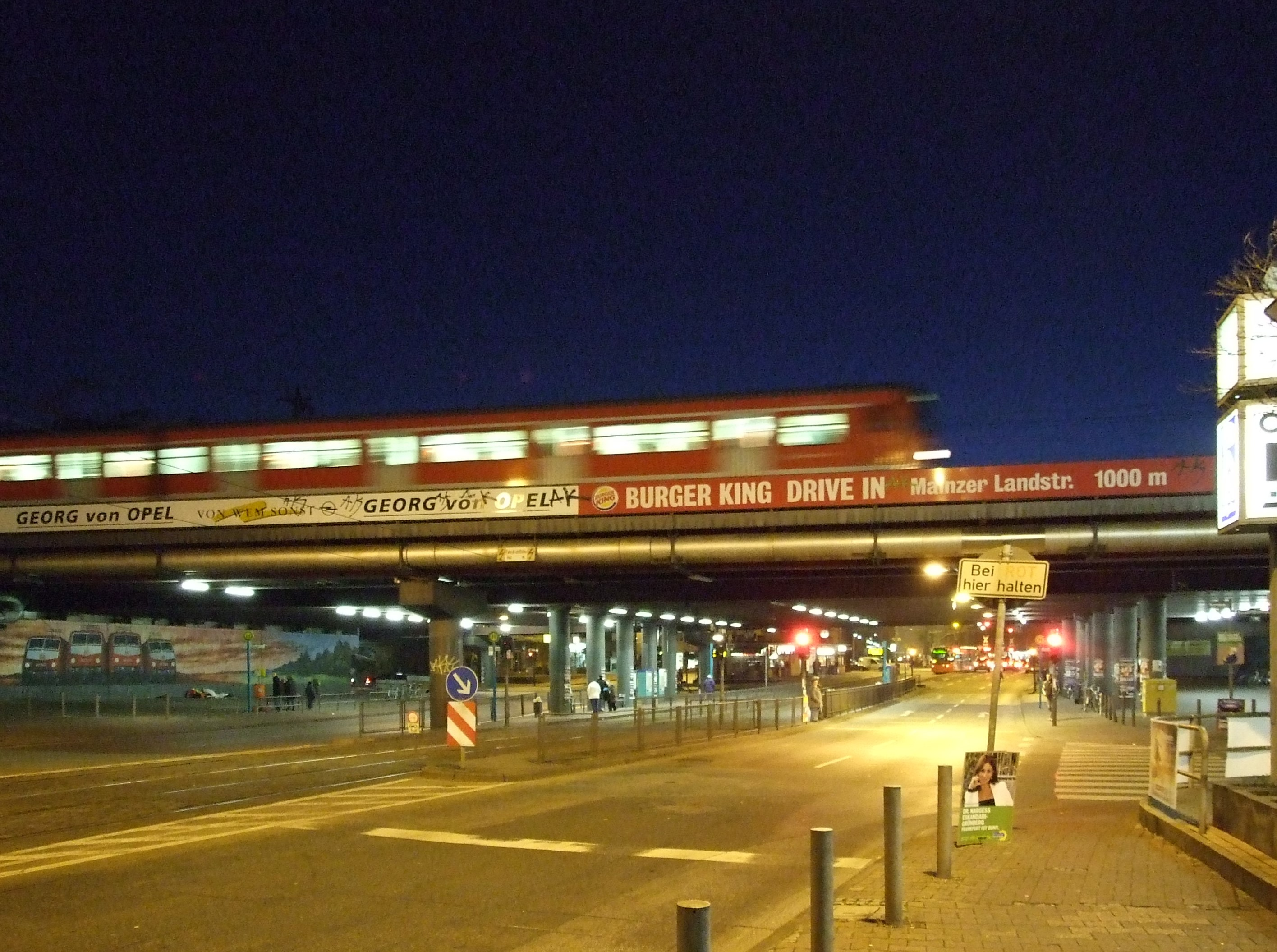
Station from below

The station was opened on 28 May 1978 and is named after a nearby medieval watchtower (the Galluswarte), which was named after the Galgenfeld ("gallows field", a place of execution). It consists of two tracks facing a 96 cm-high central platform on the Homburg Railway and two passing tracks on the Main-Weser Railway. There was formerly a junction at the station with a branch to the now closed main freight yard.

== Location ==
At the southern end of the station, the Main-Weser line divides into ramps towards Frankfurt Central Station, connecting with the Main-Neckar line and the Taunus line.

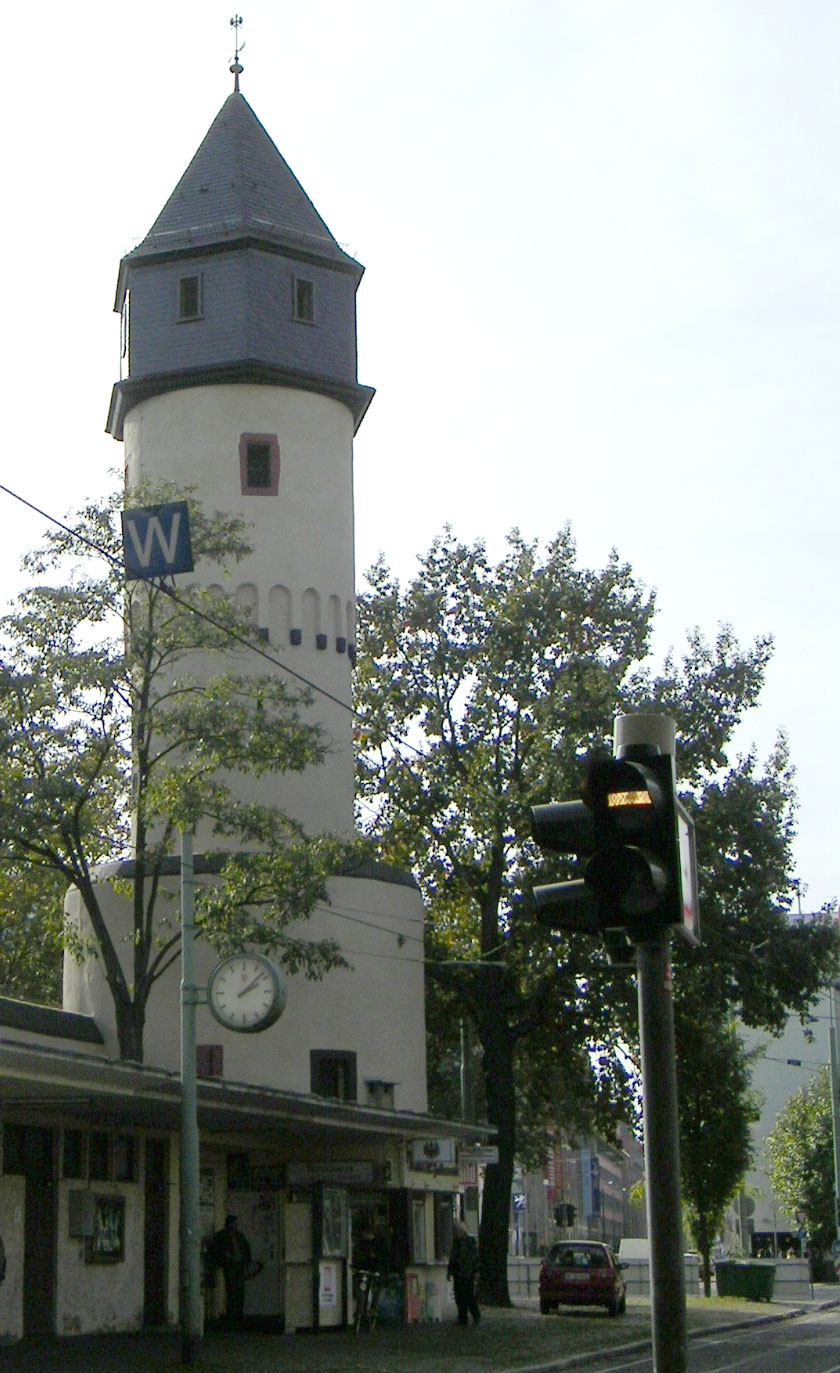
Galluswarte watchtower

The station is elevated above the streets of Mainzer Landstraße and Frankenallee. Escalators connect the platform and the two streets.

== Services ==
The station is served by S-Bahn lines S3, S4, S5 and S6. Intercity and regional trains run past on the Main Weser tracks, which have no platforms at Galluswarte.

Below the station, on Mainzer Landstraße, there is an interchange with tram lines 11 and 21, and with bus line 52.
