= Seulberg station =

Railway station in Friedrichsdorf, Germany

Seulberg
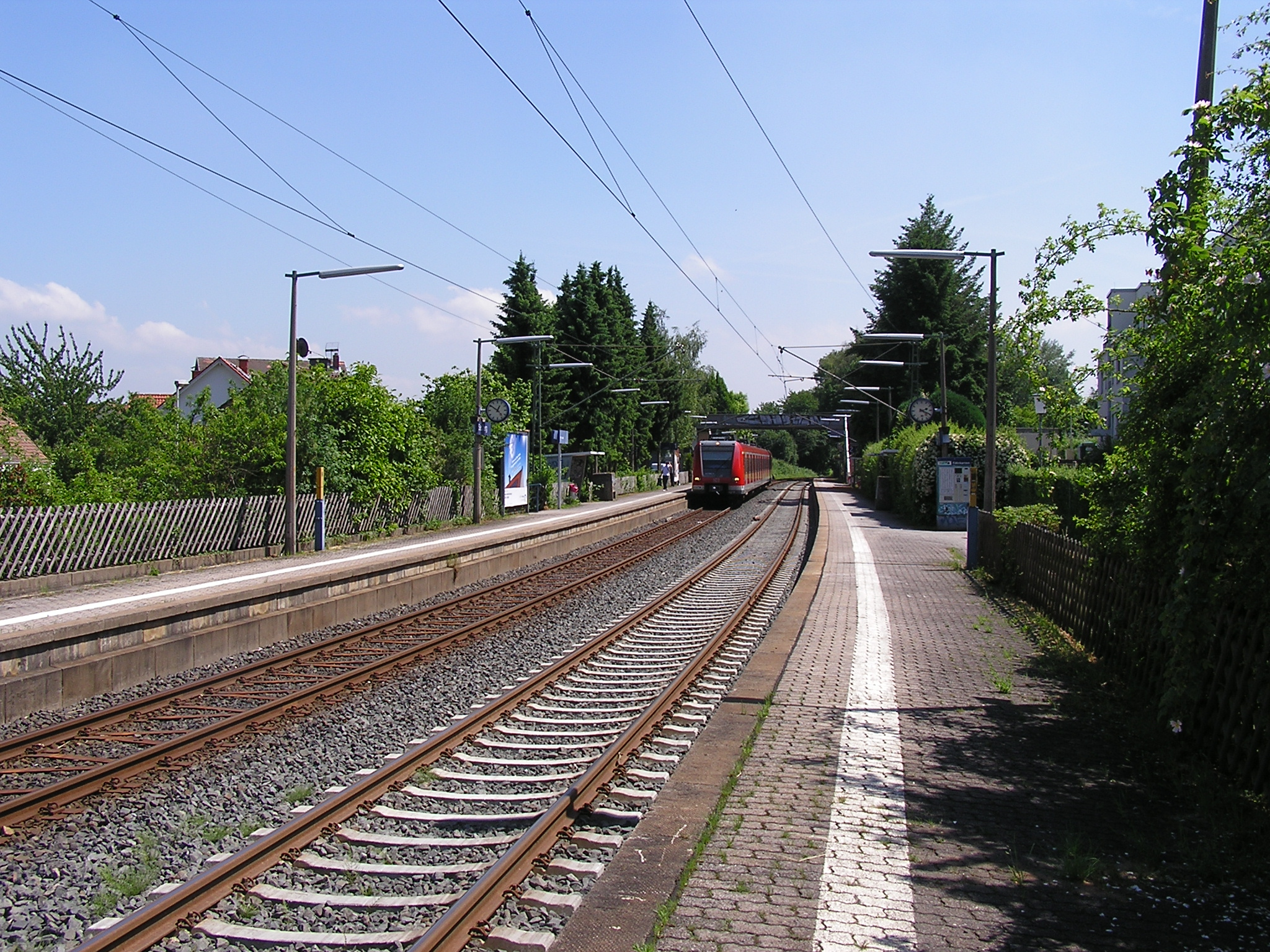
- 2008

General information
- Location: Herrenhofstraße 13; 61381 Friedrichsdorf; Hesse; Germany
- Coordinates: 50°14′32″N 8°38′44″E
- Owner: DB Netz
- Operator: DB Station&Service
- Lines: Homburg Railway (KBS 637/645.5)
- Platforms: 2 side platforms
- Tracks: 2
- Train operators: Regionalverkehre Start Deutschland; S-Bahn Rhein-Main

Construction
- Accessible: Platform 1 only

Other information
- Station code: 5832
- DS100 code: FSG
- IBNR: 8005544
- Category: 5
- Fare zone: : 5120
- Website: www.bahnhof.de

Services
| Preceding station | DB Regio Mitte | Following station |
|---|---|---|
| Bad Homburg towards Brandoberndorf | RB 15 | Friedrichsdorf towards Bad Homburg or Frankfurt (Main) Hbf |
| Preceding station | Rhine-Main S-Bahn | Following station |
| Friedrichsdorf Terminus | S5 (Rhine-Main S-Bahn) | Bad Homburg towards Südbahnhof |
Location
- Location within Hesse

Seulberg station is a railway station in the Seulberg district in the municipality of Friedrichsdorf, located in the Hochtaunuskreis district in Hesse, Germany.
