= Friedrichsdorf station =

Railway station in Friedrichsdorf, Germany

Friedrichsdorf (Taunus)
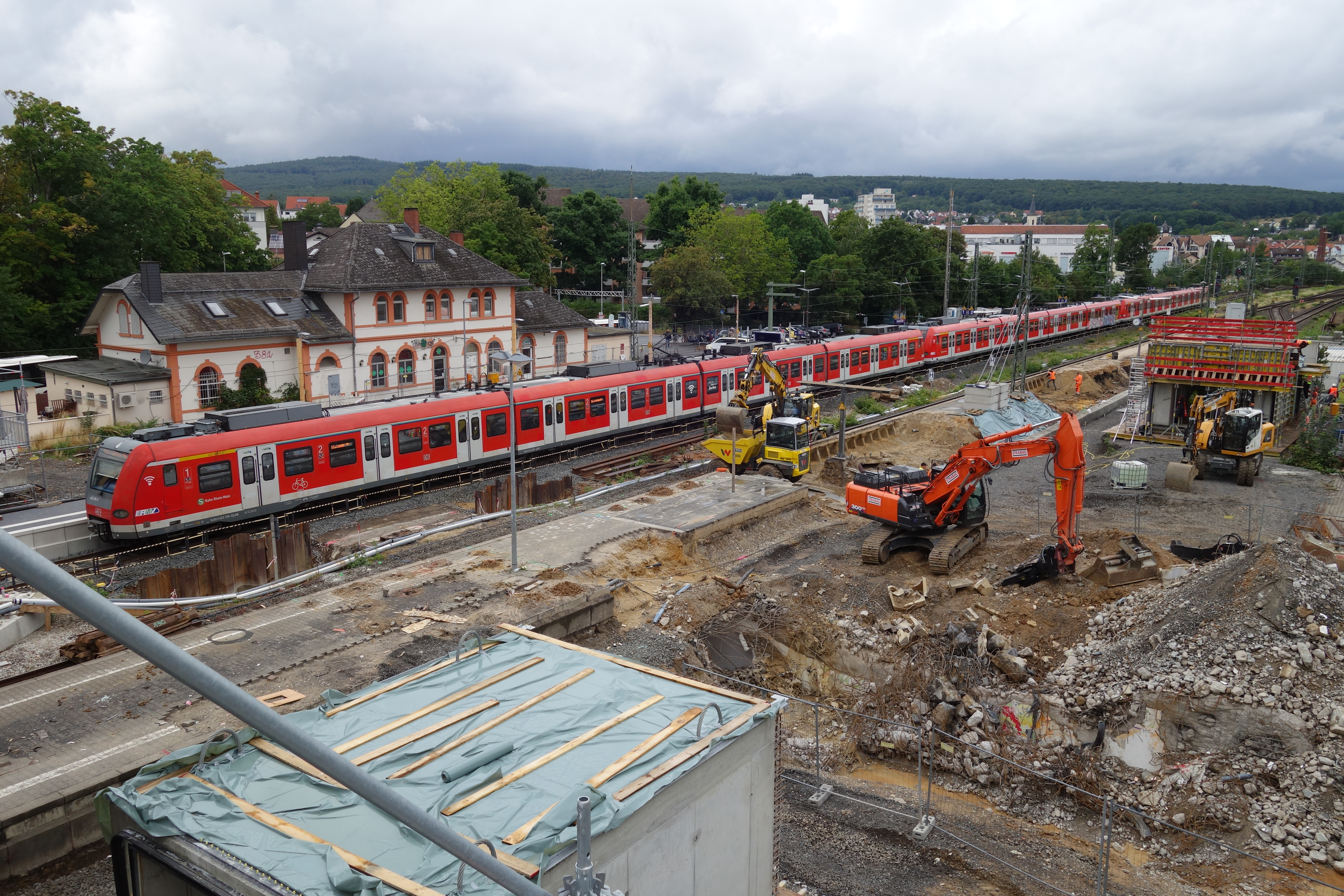
- Railway station Friedrichsdorf during modernization 2023 with S-Bahn

General information
- Location: Bahnstr. 54, Friedrichsdorf, Hesse; Germany
- Coordinates: 50°15′8″N 8°38′40″E
- Owner: DB Netz
- Operator: DB Station&Service
- Lines: Taunus Railway (0.0 km) (KBS 637); Homburg Railway (23.9 km) (KBS 637/645.5); Friedberg–Friedrichsdorf (23,8 km) (KBS 636)
- Platforms: 4

Construction
- Accessible: Yes

Other information
- Station code: 1942
- DS100 code: FFRI
- IBNR: 8002108
- Category: 4
- Fare zone: : 5125
- Website: www.bahnhof.de

History
- Opened: 1895

Passengers
- About 5,000

Services
Preceding station	DB Regio Mitte	Following station
Köppern towards Brandoberndorf	RB 15	Seulberg towards Bad Homburg or Frankfurt (Main) Hbf
Burgholzhausen vor der Höhe towards Friedberg	RB 16	Terminus
Preceding station	Rhine-Main S-Bahn	Following station
Terminus	S5 (Rhine-Main S-Bahn)	Seulberg towards Südbahnhof
Location
- Location within Hesse

Friedrichsdorf (Taunus) station is in the centre of Friedrichsdorf on Bahnstraße. Although the city has mostly dispensed with the appendage of "Taunus" in its name the station still officially retains it, although signs on the newest platform and Rhein-Main-Verkehrsverbund maps do not include it. The station is classified by Deutsche Bahn as a category 4 station.

== History ==
In 1895, construction began on the Usingen Railway (German: Usinger Bahn), now the Taunus Railway (Taunusbahn), to connect Friedrichsdorf and the Taunus communities with Frankfurt in order "to bring the backwardness of the region to an end." It ran a single track from the Usinger Bahnhof (“Usingen station”) in Bad Homburg via Seulberg to Friedrichsdorf and continued via Köppern into the Taunus. During its construction, Friedrichsdorf station was planned as a through station. Already plans had been developed for another rail connection between Friedrichsdorf and the Main–Weser Railway. The Friedberg–Friedrichsdorf railway was not opened until 1901. Its construction lead to the upgrading of the whole line from Frankfurt via Friedrichsdorf to Friedberg in order to increase its capacity, at the personal request of Emperor Wilhelm II, including its duplication from 1907 until 1910. Initially there were two passenger tracks and a freight track at the station. To the south towards Seulberg, a wooden bridge was built across the tracks. The station building is west of the tracks. It consists of a central building with two floors and two lateral extensions and is very similar to Usingen station.

The line was soon carrying freight. Especially in freight operations, excess demand often caused delays.

Later, direct sidings were built to local firms. Rühl AG & Co. and the Tettauer glass works both had a siding. The main operation of the glass works was established in Friedrichsdorf in 1945, as the rail connection to its original plant in Tettau was cut by the establishment of the inner-German border (even though it was in Bavaria).

On 27 September 1970, electric services began running on the line to Friedrichsdorf. In addition, seven years later a relay interlocking was built in Bad Homburg, controlling the area from Weißkirchen and extended to Friedrichsdorf in 1978. The trains on the lines from Grävenwiesbach (the Taunus Railway) and Friedberg (the Friedberg–Friedrichsdorf railway) now mainly ended in Friedrichsdorf. In 1974, operations of an S-Bahn-like service as line R5 began on the line between Frankfurt Central Station and Friedrichsdorf with its inclusion in the Frankfurter Verkehrs- und Tarifverbund (Frankfurt Transport Association, the forerunner of the Rhein-Main-Verkehrsverbund between 1974 and 1995, FVV). This evolved in 1978 into the current line S5 of the Rhine-Main S-Bahn. In 1992, the line of the Usingen Railway from Friedrichsdorf to Grävenwiesbach was reactivated in 1993 as the “T-Bahn” and supported by the FVV. The trains now continued to Bad Homburg. Since the take-over of operations by the Rhein-Main-Verkehrsverbund (Rhine-Main Transport Association, RMV), no Taunus Railway services now terminate in Friedrichsdorf.

== Infrastructure ==
Friedrichsdorf station is now served by three lines, with two of them terminating there: the line to Friedberg (RMV line 16) and S-Bahn line S5, as the electrification of the line ends there. The other service on the Taunus Railway (RMV line 15) continues to Bad Homburg, or—in the peak hour—Frankfurt Central Station. New LCD information displays went into service in February 2008.

=== Buildings and facilities ===
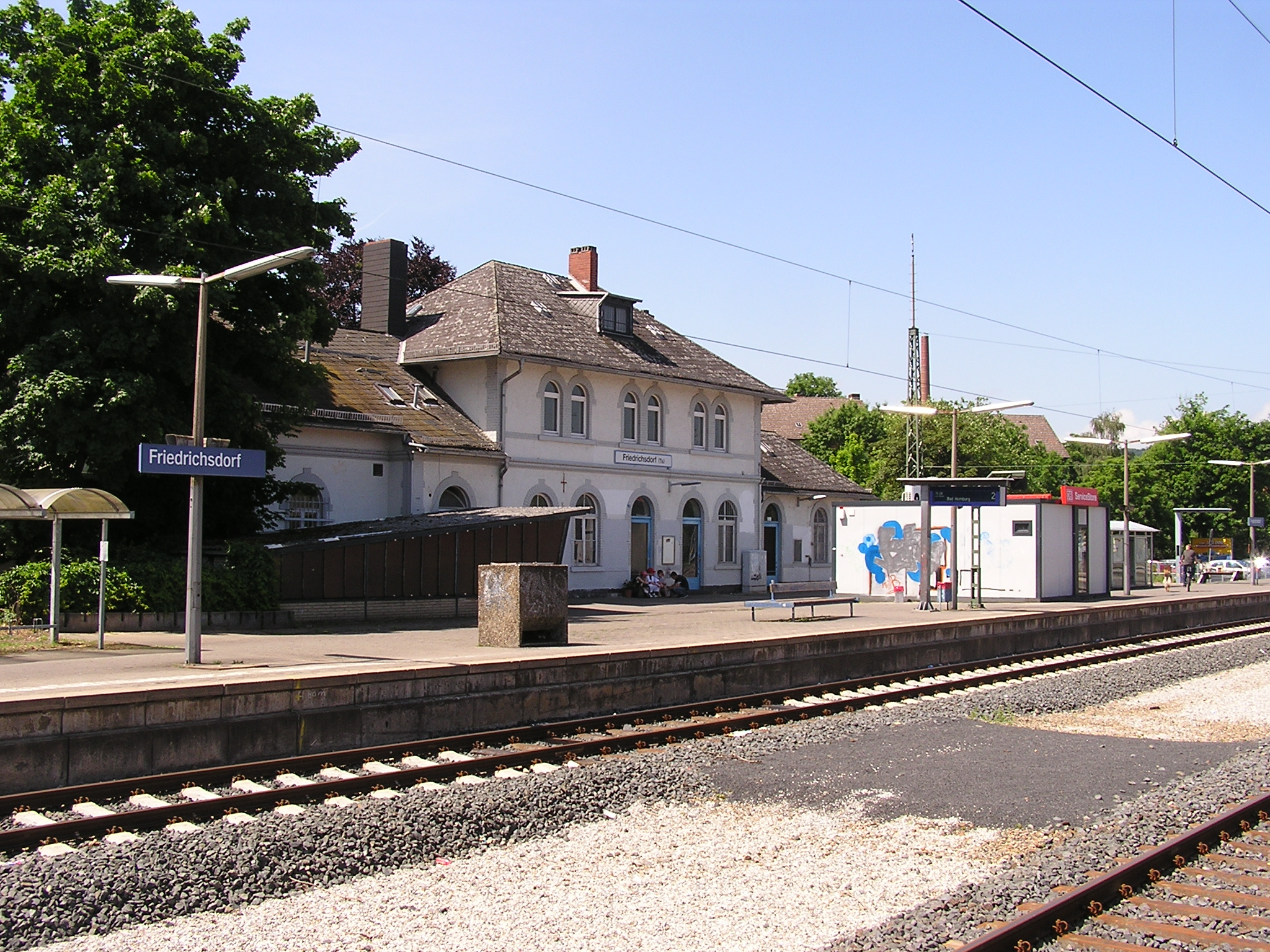
Entrance building with the home platform (track 2) in the summer of 2007

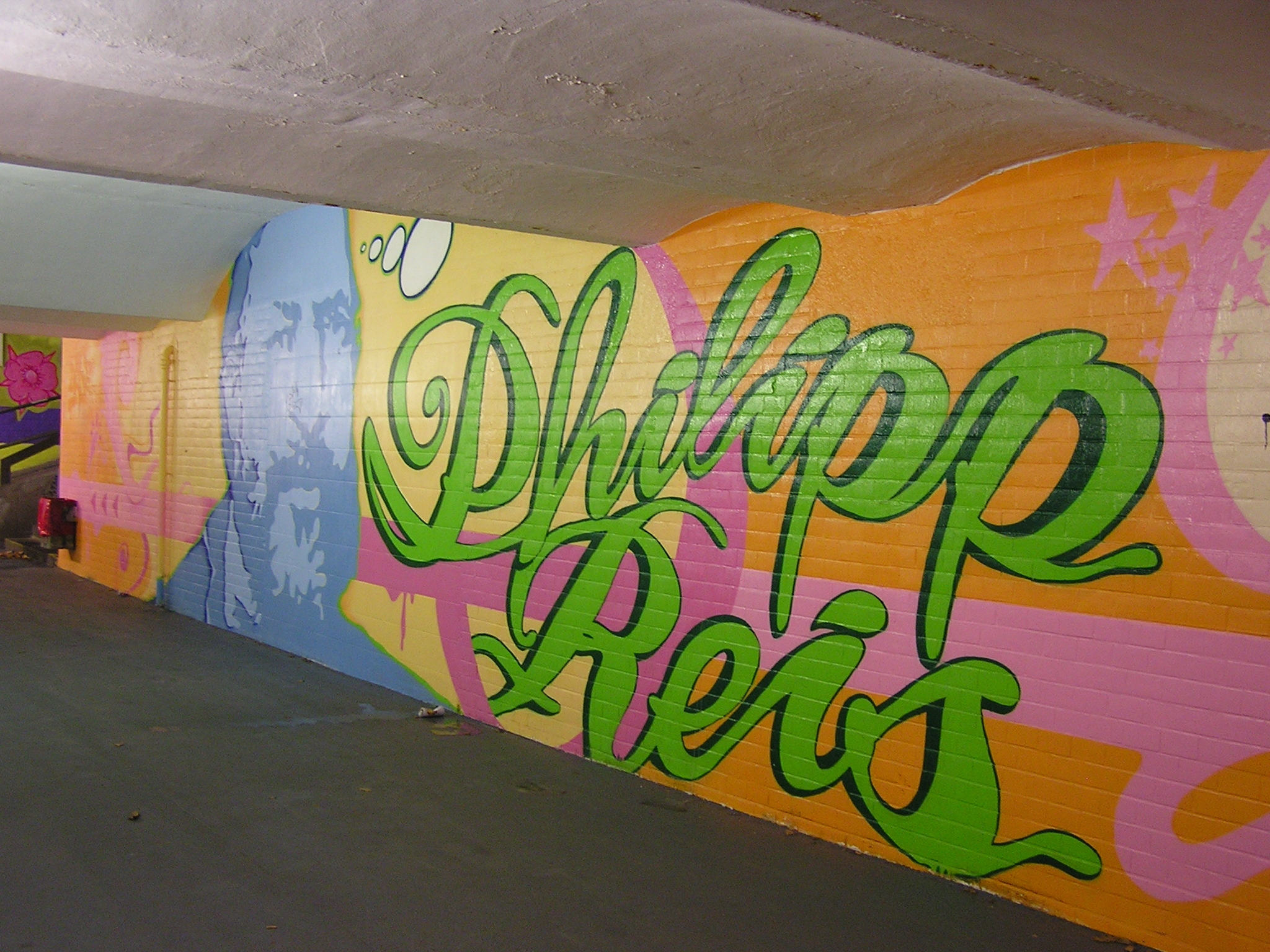
Restored underpass

There was still a ticket office in the entrance building until 2005. The entrance building is privately owned but has not been used for some years and there are continuing negotiations over restoring it to use.

A vending machine was placed in a converted shipping container on the platform as a replacement for the ticket counter in the entrance building. In this Deutsche Bahn Servicepavillon tickets were sold along with drinks, snacks and magazines. At the beginning of 2008, it was closed without notice, but shortly afterwards it was re-opened by another operator. In 2009, Taunus Real acquired the entrance building and renovated it. The services operated from the kiosk have been moved back into the building and it is intended that the container on the platform will be removed. The area of the entrance building that was formerly operated as a pub and the upper storey are still unused.

Since December 2007, the town of Friedrichsdorf has attempted to have the condition of the platforms and, especially, the subway resolved. The municipality has organised the restoration of the subway, partly using volunteer labour.

Reconstruction of the station, including the renewal or retrofitting of waiting shelters, bicycle parking boxes, lighting, and tactile paving for the visually impaired, began on 10 July 2022, and was originally scheduled for completion in the second quarter of 2024. The existing pedestrian underpass was opened on 23 September 2025, after its original completion date of September 2023. As of September 2025, the lifts were scheduled to be opened on 1 December 2025, and all work was to be completed on 23 December 2025.

=== Tracks ===
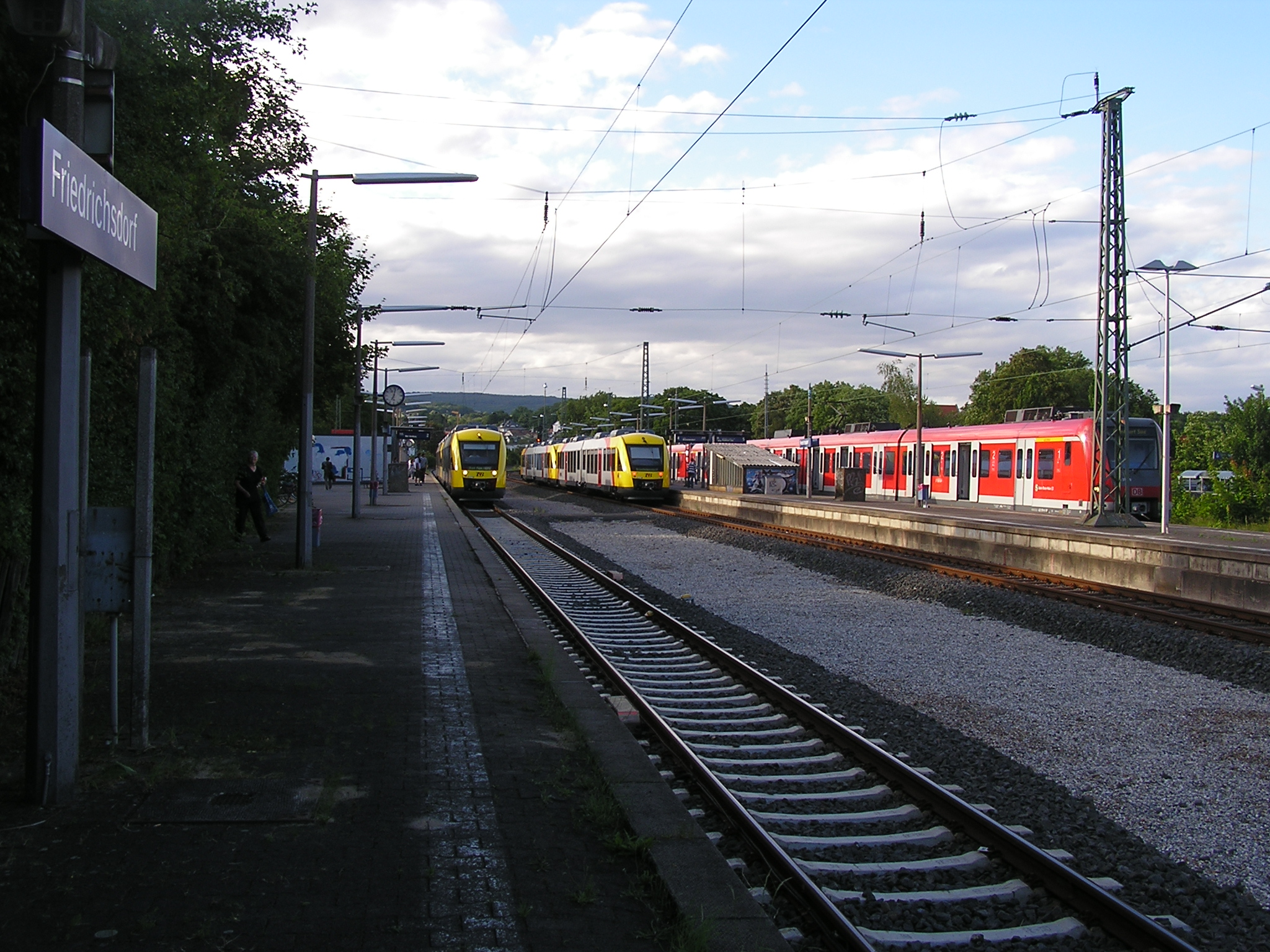
S-Bahn and Taunusbahn services meeting at the station

Friedrichsdorf station has four platform tracks. In the past there were 8 tracks, which were controlled by the local signal box. All platforms have a height of 76 cm.

== Services ==
In front of the entrance building there is a small bus station, from which municipal buses operate to the local area and to Bad Homburg as well as line 59 to Grävenwiesbach and line FB-16 to Friedberg.
