= Homburg Railway =

Railway line in Germany

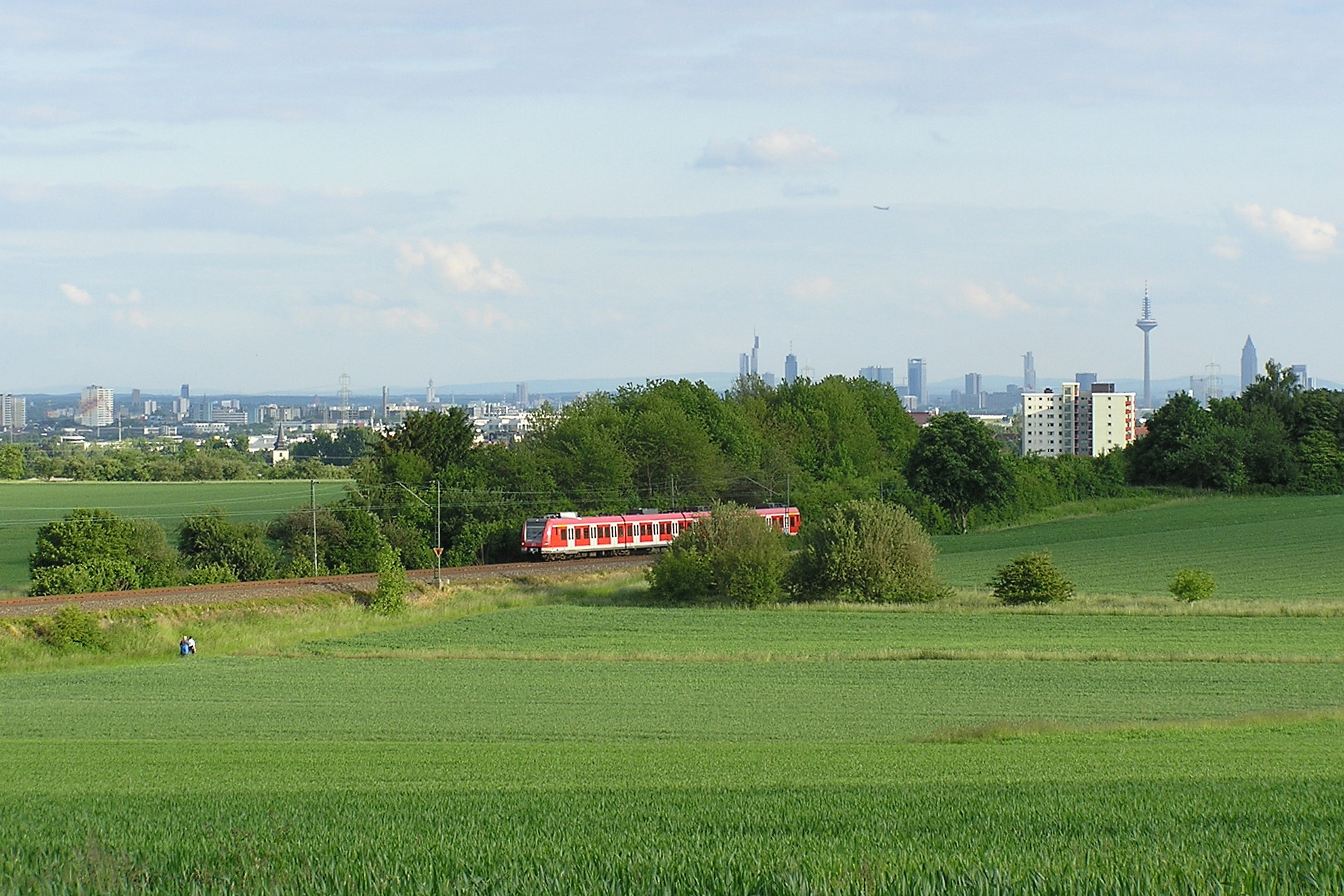
- Class 423 train near Bad Homburg

Overview
- Other name: Frankfurt-Friedrichsdorf Railway
- Native name: Homburger Bahn
- Status: Operational
- Owner: Deutsche Bahn
- Line number: 3611
- Locale: Hesse, Germany
- Termini: Frankfurt Hbf; Friedrichsdorf
- Stations: 11

Service
- Type: Heavy rail, Passenger rail Regional rail, Commuter rail
- Route number: 637; 645.5 (S-Bahn)
- Operator(s): Rhein-Main S-Bahn, Hessische Landesbahn

History
- Opened: 10 September 1860
- Completed: 1895 (Bad Homburg-Friedrichsdorf)

Technical
- Line length: 23.9 km (14.9 mi)
- Number of tracks: Double track
- Track gauge: 1,435 mm (4 ft 8 1/2 in) standard gauge
- Electrification: 15 kV/16.7 Hz AC Overhead line
- Operating speed: 120 km/h (74.6 mph)

The Homburg Railway (German: Homburger Bahn) is an 18 km line from Frankfurt am Main to Bad Homburg in the German state of Hesse. It was opened in 1860 as one of the first railway lines in Germany. It is now part of the Rhine-Main S-Bahn line S5 to Friedrichsdorf.

== History ==
Early on, there was support in Homburg for an efficient transport connection from Frankfurt in order to increase patronage to its spa and casino. In 1850 a horse-drawn omnibus provided an hourly service from Frankfurt to Homburg, but this soon was not enough to meet the needs of travellers. Projects to build railways failed in 1836, 1845, 1851 and 1856, caused by funding problems and the number of small states that the line would have to run through: the line as built was only 18 km long but it ran across the territories of four independent countries: the Free City of Frankfurt, the Grand Duchy of Hesse (Darmstadt), the Duchy of Nassau and the Landgraviate of Hesse-Homburg. Nassau had concerns because it would increase competition with its own spas. The Electorate of Hesse-Kassel's opposition forced the line to avoid Bockenheim, which was in Hesse-Kassel territory on the Main-Weser Railway, just outside Frankfurt. The locals called the line with some exaggeration the "six nation railway".

When, after tough negotiations, at the end of June 1859 an acceptable route was found and the Homburg casino agreed to finance it, all countries concerned granted a concession to the British railway entrepreneur, Sir Samuel Morton Peto and the Homburg Railway Company (Homburger Eisenbahn-Gesellschaft, HEG) was founded. Construction under the direction of the famous railway engineer Edmund Heusinger von Waldegg was carried out very quickly and on 10 September 1860 the first passenger trains ran, the first goods train on 6 October 1860. In Frankfurt it connected with the Main-Weser station (Main-Weser-Bahnhof) on the Gallusanlage (a section of the old Frankfurt wall), and ran along the Taunus Railway to the old vineyards (Rebstockgelände) west of Frankfurt, where it branched off to Rödelheim. It then went ran via Weisskirchen and Oberursel to Homburg, where it ended at a terminal station in Louisenstraße.

At its opening it had 28 first to third class carriages and luggage and freight wagons and four locomotives with a 1B wheel arrangement, supplied by Henschel with works numbers 46 to 49. In 1870, a similar locomotive was procured from Henschel with the works number 290. The number of carriages had been increased to 36. Initially eight pairs of trains ran daily.

=== Further development ===
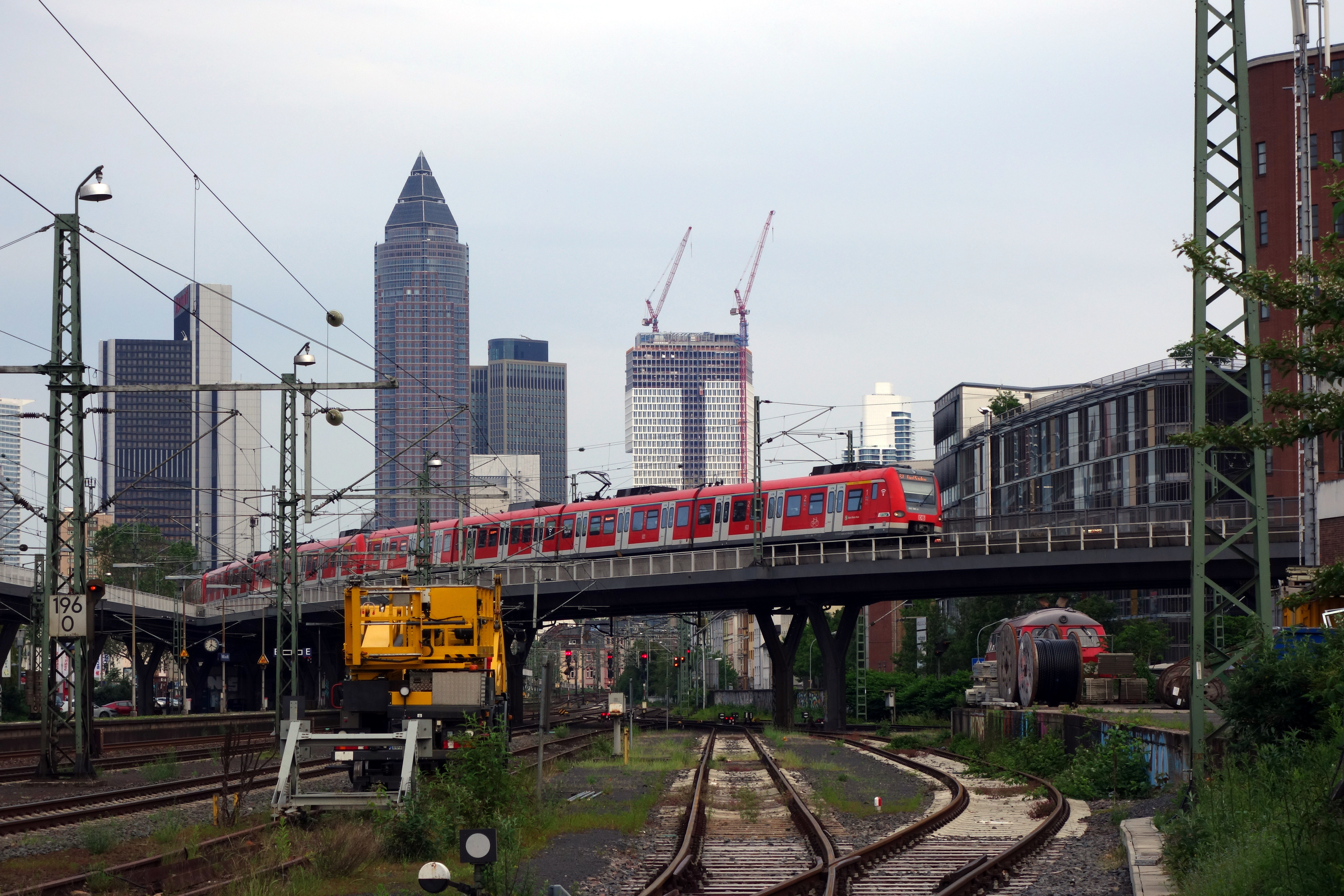
Since 1884 the Homburg Railway begins at Frankfurt West station

The Prussian annexations after the War of 1866 simplified the situation for the railway. The whole route now ran through Prussia, except for one small piece at Weißkirchen station. The closing of the casino by the Prussian state in 1872 led to a significant fall in passenger numbers. In 1873 and 1874 the Kronberg Railway was built by a private railway company: it branched off after Rödelheim to Kronberg.

On 1 January 1880 the railway was sold to Prussia because the company could not afford and did not want the changes to the line required for connection to the planned new Frankfurt Hauptbahnhof. It thus became part of the Prussian state railways. The line was diverted to connect at Bockenheim station (now Frankfurt West), which had to be avoided in 1860, on the also nationalised Main-Weser Railway. The diversion, opened on 10 May 1884, shortened the line to 15.6 km from Frankfurt West. The old line through the vineyards was removed.

=== Extension and expansion ===
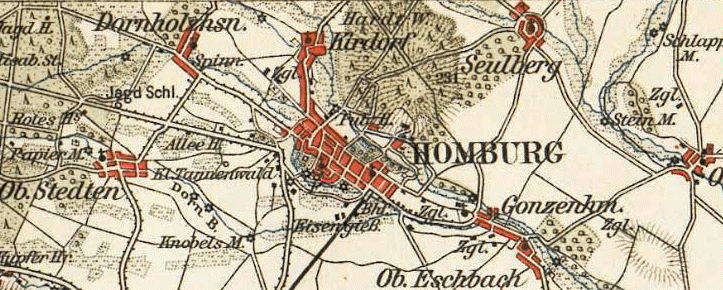
Old station in Homburg

In 1895, the Usingen line from Homburg via Friedrichsdorf to Usingen was opened and some years later extended to Weilburg and Wetzlar on the Lahntal railway. In Homburg a second terminal station (Homburg Neu, new Homburg) was built in Louisenstraße, 200 to 300 metres from the first station, on the site of the current town hall. A link line between the two stations enabled shunting. Planning of a line to Friedberg began in 1868, although construction did not start until 1898 and the line was commissioned on 15 July 1901. It branched off the line to Usingen in Friedrichsdorf.

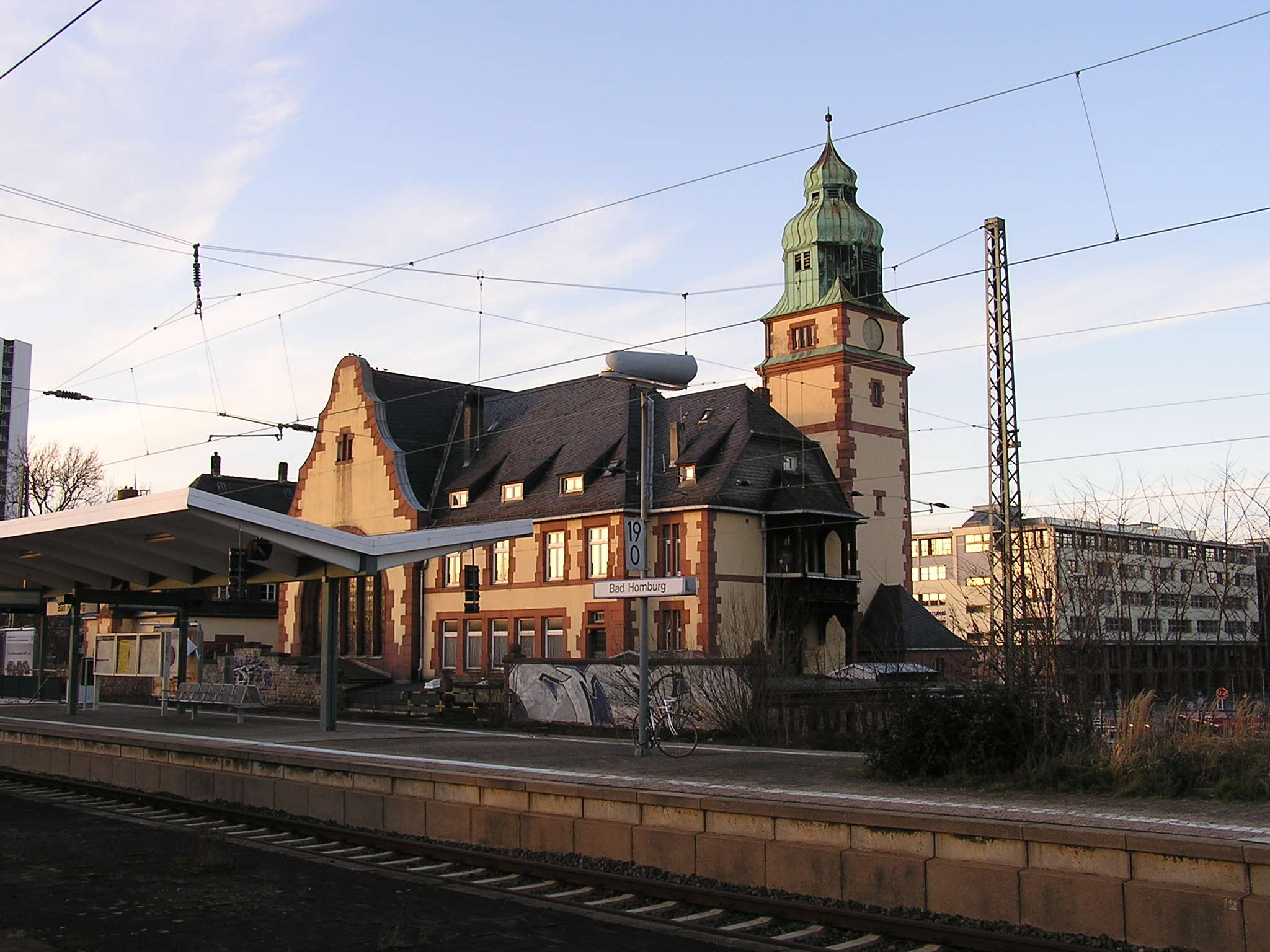
New Homburg station

In 1907, the old Homburg stations were replaced with the current station, creating a through line to Friedrichsdorf. In 1912, Homburg was renamed Bad Homburg. Between 1907 and 1912 the entire route from Frankfurt to Friedrichsdorf and Friedberg was duplicated.

=== Connecting curves ===
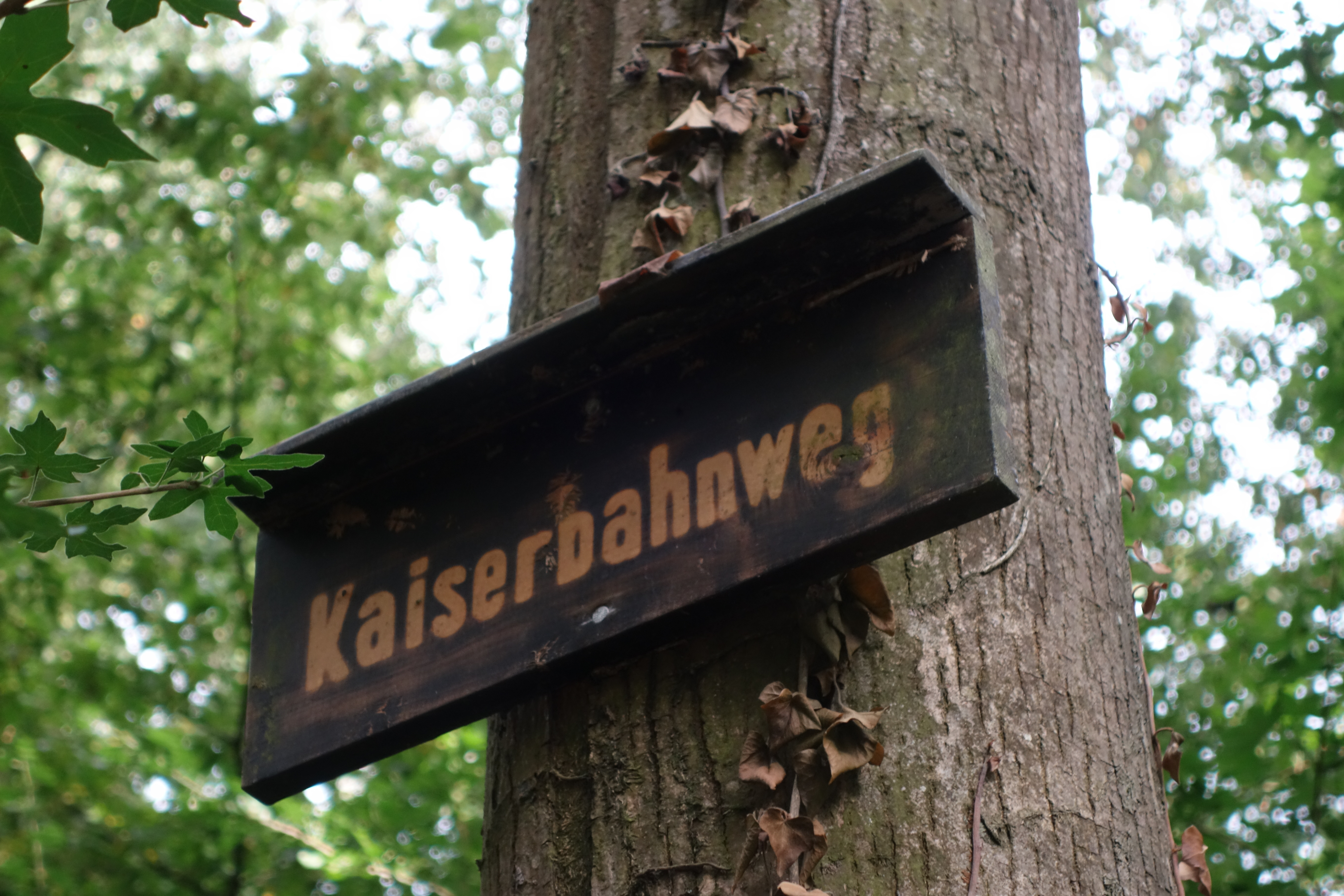
The sign Kaiserbahnweg (i. e. "Emperor's rail path") reminds at Niedwald forest of the former railway line

On 1 September 1905, a link was opened at the request of Emperor Wilhelm II through the Frankfurt vineyards (Rebstockgelände), initially only for freight and special trains. It branched off the Homburg line south of Rödelheim along a new connection to the Taunus Railway towards Wiesbaden via Höchst. It was used from 1908 by passenger trains on the Bad Nauheim–Wiesbaden line (Bäderbahn, i. e. Spa Railway) between the spa (German: Bad) towns of Wiesbaden, Bad Homburg and Bad Nauheim. A further link between this line and Frankfurt Hauptbahnhof was opened on 15 March 1927 and is still used by trains connecting to the Taunusbahn to the north of Bad Homburg. The curve from Homburg to Höchst was demolished in 1963 during motorway construction. Still, along the former railway line through the Niedwald forest, a path is named Kaiserbahnweg (i. e. "Emperor's rail path").

=== After 1945 ===
After repairs to war damage the line recovered its importance for handling commuter traffic to Frankfurt. On 23 May 1954 a regular interval half-hourly timetable was introduced, initially hauled by class 78 steam locomotives and class V 80 and later V 100 diesel locomotives. The extension to Friedberg was downgraded to a single-track branch line due to war damage and a loss of profitability.

Following the completion of electrification on 26 September 1970 services were usually operated by trains hauled by class 141 electric locomotives. From 25 September 1977 S-Bahn services were operated by electric multiple units of class 420 terminating in Friedrichsdorf. Since 2003 the newer class 423 trains have operated on the line.

== Operations ==
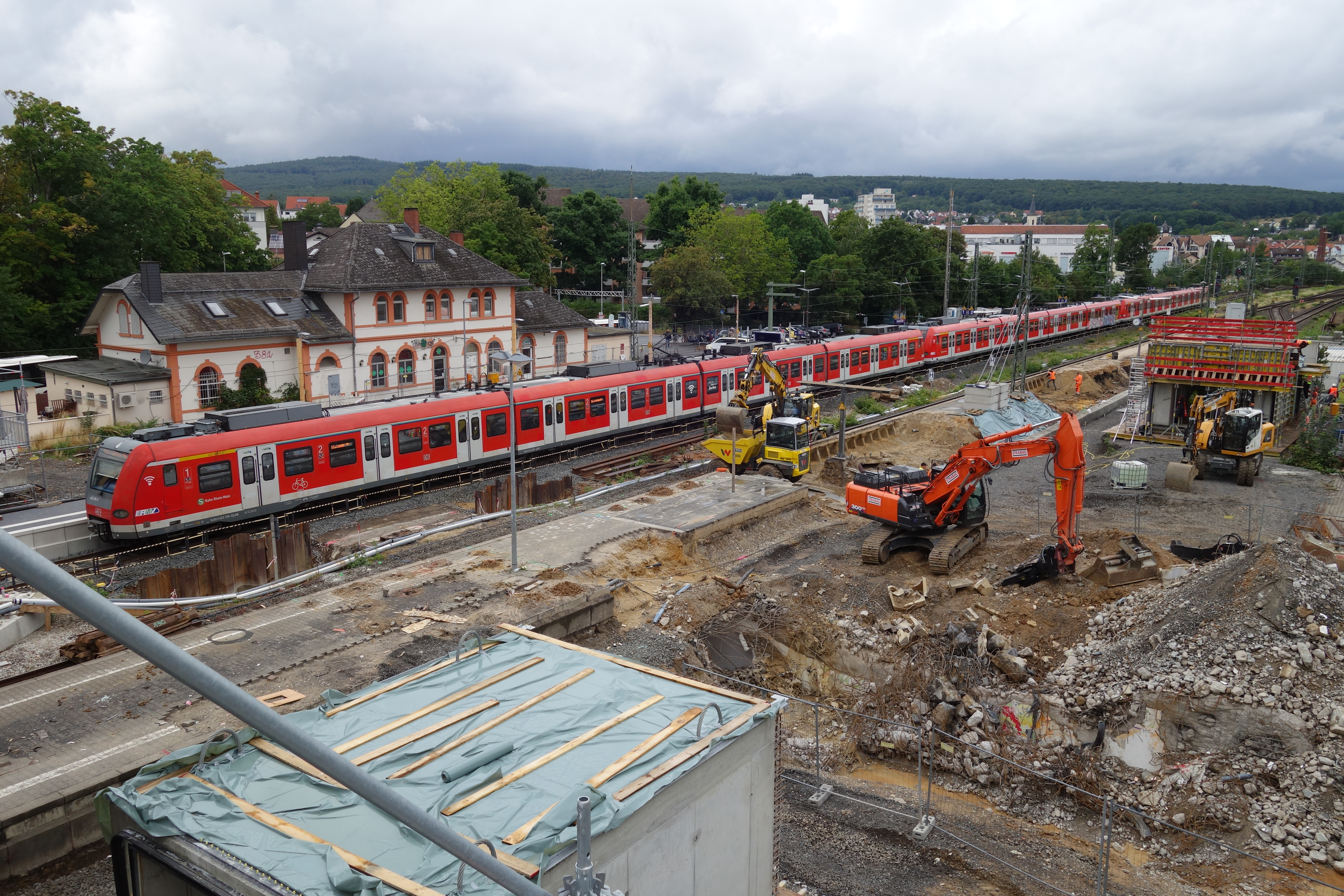
Railway station Friedrichsdorf during modernization in 2023 with S-Bahn

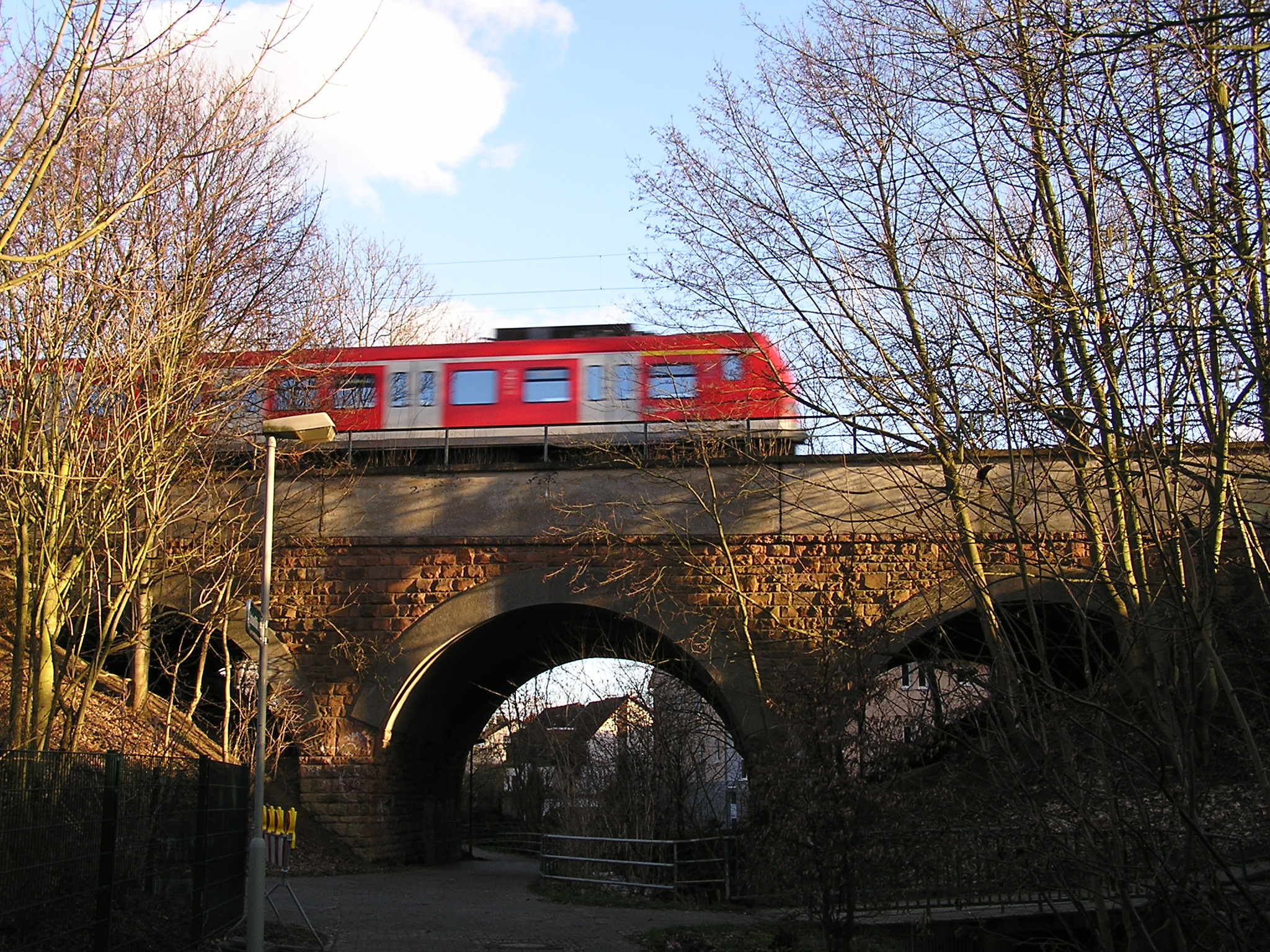
S5 S-Bahn train on Kirdorf Bach viaduct

The Homburg line is now used by S-Bahn S5 services between Frankfurt South and Friedrichsdorf, and Hessische Landesbahn RB 15 services on the Taunusbahn between Frankfurt and Friedrichsdorf and Brandoberndorf. S-Bahn line S3 (Frankfurt South–Bad Soden) and line S4 (Frankfurt South–Kronberg im Taunus) use the section of the Homburg line from the City Tunnel to Rödelheim. Line S6 uses Homburg line tracks as far as Frankfurt West instead of the parallel Main-Weser line. The Homburg line is integrated in the Rhein-Main-Verkehrsverbund (RMV) transport network.

== Future ==
It is planned to extend line U2 of the Frankfurt U-Bahn from Bad Homburg-Gonzenheim to Homburg station.

A project known as Regionaltangente West (Regional tangent west) would build a north–south line through Frankfurt Airport Regional station and could connect with the Bad Homburg line.
