= Konstablerwache =

Town square in Frankfurt, Germany

Coordinates: 50°06′52″N 8°41′13″E

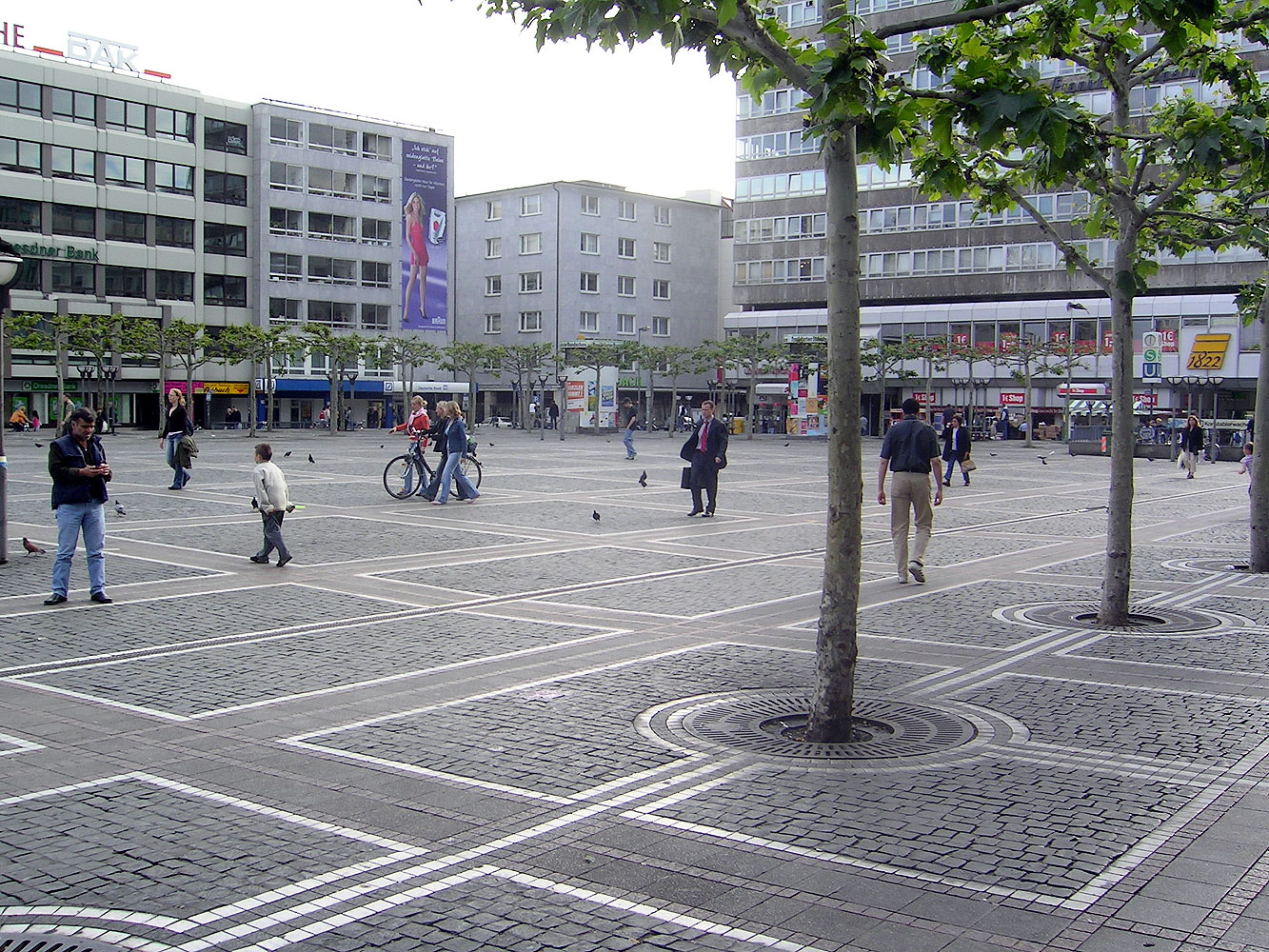
Konstablerwache

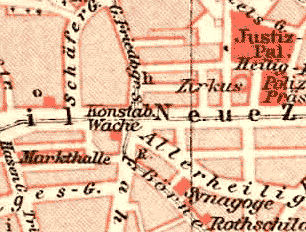
Konstablerwache, 1893

Konstablerwache is a square in the centre of Frankfurt am Main and part of the city's pedestrian zone. It lies to the east of Hauptwache with both squares linked by the Zeil, the central shopping street of the city.

== History ==
At the corner of the current Konstablerwache square near the street of Fahrgasse, an armoury was established in 1544 for the defence of Frankfurt; this long represented the eastern end of the Zeil. In 1822 the building, which had been upgraded into a military guard house, was converted into a police station. The name Konstablerwache, (literally: "constable watch-house") comes from the period when the building was used as an armoury; the term constable was then used in Frankfurt for a military rank in the artillery. In 1833, it was at the centre of an attempted revolution when revolutionary students attacked and attempted to loot it and the main watch-house (Hauptwache).

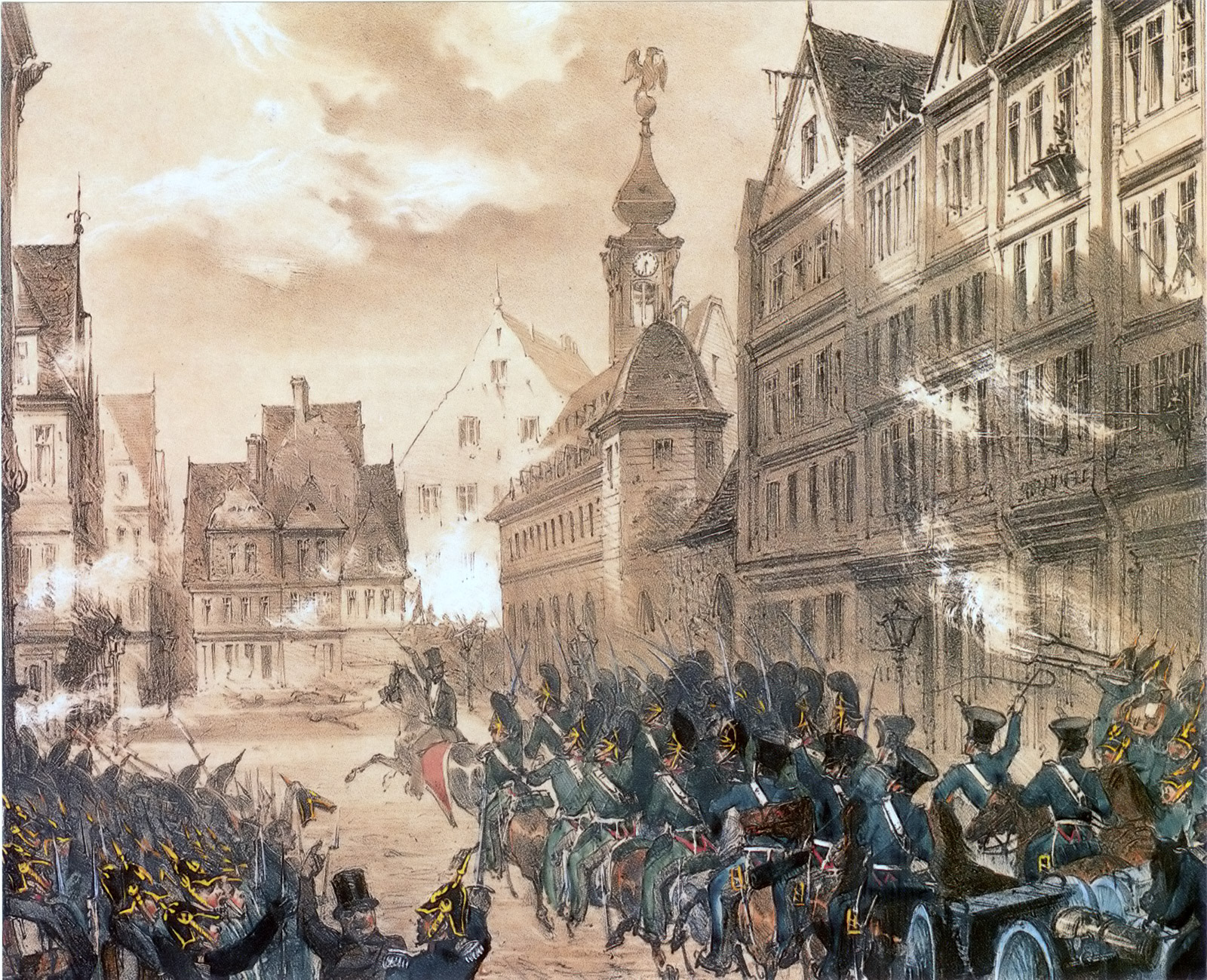
Storming the barricade at Konstablerwache in the Revolution of 1848

Later the two watch-houses proved too small for a growing city, and a new police headquarters was built at Hohenzollernplatz (now Platz der Republik). In contrast to Hauptwache, Konstablerwache was demolished in 1886 and replaced by commercial buildings. The Bienenkorbhaus office building was built on the site in 1953–54, the architect was Johannes Krahn.

Until 1881 the present square was a significant but narrow road junction at the end of the broad street of the Zeil, with Allerheiligenstraße connecting towards the southeast to Allerheiligentor, Fahrgasse continuing to the east and Große Friedberger Strasse as the main north-south link in the old town, leading to Alte Brücke (old bridge) in the south and Friedberger Tor in the north. In that year, the New Zeil was built as a wide commercial street leading from Konstablerwache to the east towards Friedberger Anlage (the eastern section of the old city wall). Between the New Zeil and Allerheiligenstraße there was a small square, which was far smaller than the modern square. At the beginning of the 20th century Konstablerwache became a major transport hub, both for cars and trams.

The situation changed dramatically after the Second World War. With many of the buildings on the Zeil destroyed in air raids, it was decided not to rebuild all of them in order to create a larger square. At the same time Kurt-Schumacher-Strasse was built, replacing Fahrgasse as the main north-south route in the eastern part of the city, and giving Konstablerwache its current eastern boundary. When the square was converted into a pedestrian zone, the level of the square was raised by just under 80 centimetres in order to create room for the underground U-Bahn/S-Bahn station.

== Public transport ==
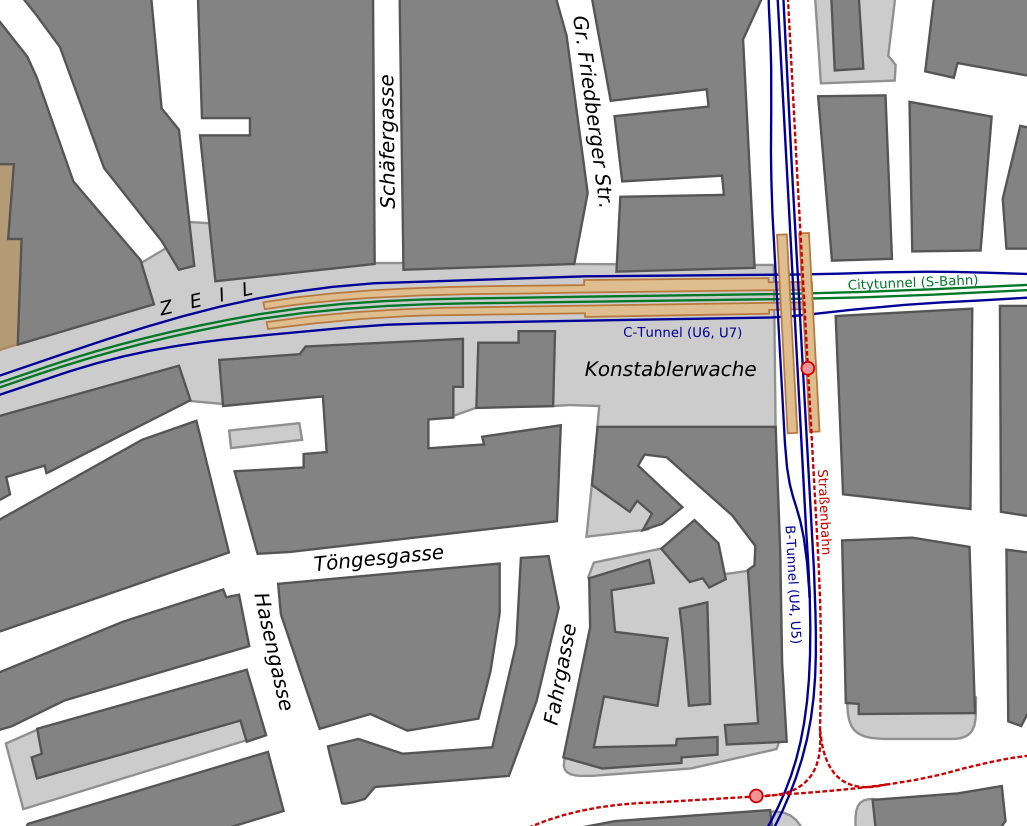
Public transport node

The former tram junction lost its significance when the main tram lines were closed in the inner city in the 70s. The Zeil was initially served by trams even after its conversion into a pedestrian zone; the track was closed during the construction of the S-Bahn tunnel between Hauptwache and Konstablerwache, a new line was built in the parallel Stephanstraße, taking over part of the traffic. This line had been closed in the 1960s, but was put back into operation until 1986 as the terminus of line 12 connecting to Nordend. In 1999, tram tracks were opened in Kurt-Schumacher-Straße, creating a through route for line 12 from Fechenheim to Schwanheim.

Konstablerwache station, situated under the square, is a major interchange on Frankfurt's U-Bahn and S-Bahn networks.
