= Offenbach-Kaiserlei station =

Railway station in Offenbach am Main, Germany

Offenbach-Kaiserlei
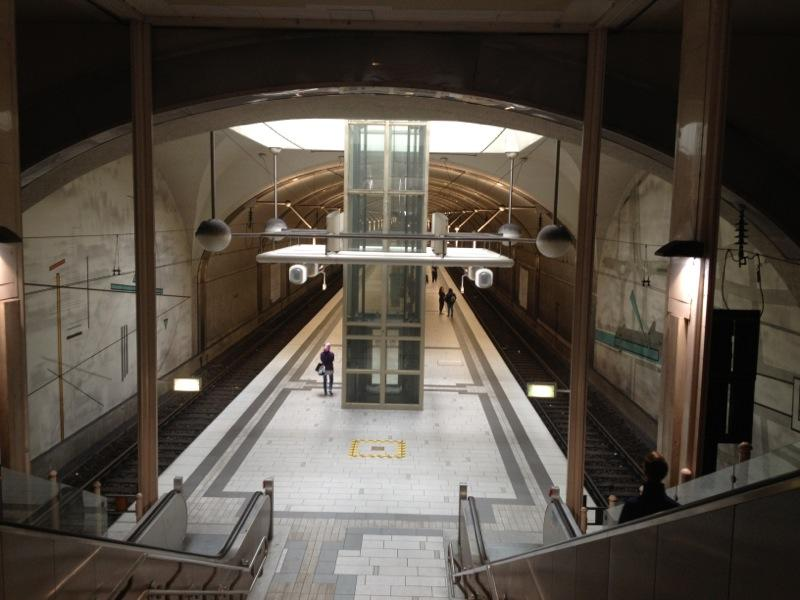
- 2013

General information
- Location: Berliner Straße 310; 63065 Offenbach am Main; Hesse; Germany
- Coordinates: 50.1053°N 8.7398°E
- System: Hp
- Owner: DB Netz
- Operator: DB Station&Service
- Lines: Offenbach City Tunnel (KBS 645.x)
- Platforms: 1 island platform
- Tracks: 2
- Train operators: S-Bahn Rhein-Main

Construction
- Parking: yes
- Cycle facilities: yes
- Accessible: yes

Other information
- Station code: 7169
- DS100 code: FOKL
- IBNR: 8070092
- Category: 4
- Fare zone: : 3670
- Website: www.bahnhof.de

Services
Preceding station	Rhine-Main S-Bahn	Following station
Frankfurt Mühlberg towards Wiesbaden Hbf	S1 (Rhine-Main S-Bahn)	Offenbach Ledermuseum towards Rödermark-Ober Roden
Frankfurt Mühlberg towards Niedernhausen	S2 (Rhine-Main S-Bahn)	Offenbach Ledermuseum towards Dietzenbach
Frankfurt Mühlberg towards Wiesbaden Hbf	S8 (Rhine-Main S-Bahn)	Offenbach Ledermuseum towards Hanau Hbf
Frankfurt Mühlberg towards Wiesbaden Hbf	S9 (Rhine-Main S-Bahn)	Offenbach Ledermuseum towards Hanau Hbf
Location
- Location within Hesse Location within Germany Location within Europe

Offenbach-Kaiserlei station is a railway station in Offenbach am Main, Hesse, Germany.
