= Frankfurt Hauptwache station =

Railway station in Frankfurt, Germany

Frankfurt (Main) Hauptwache
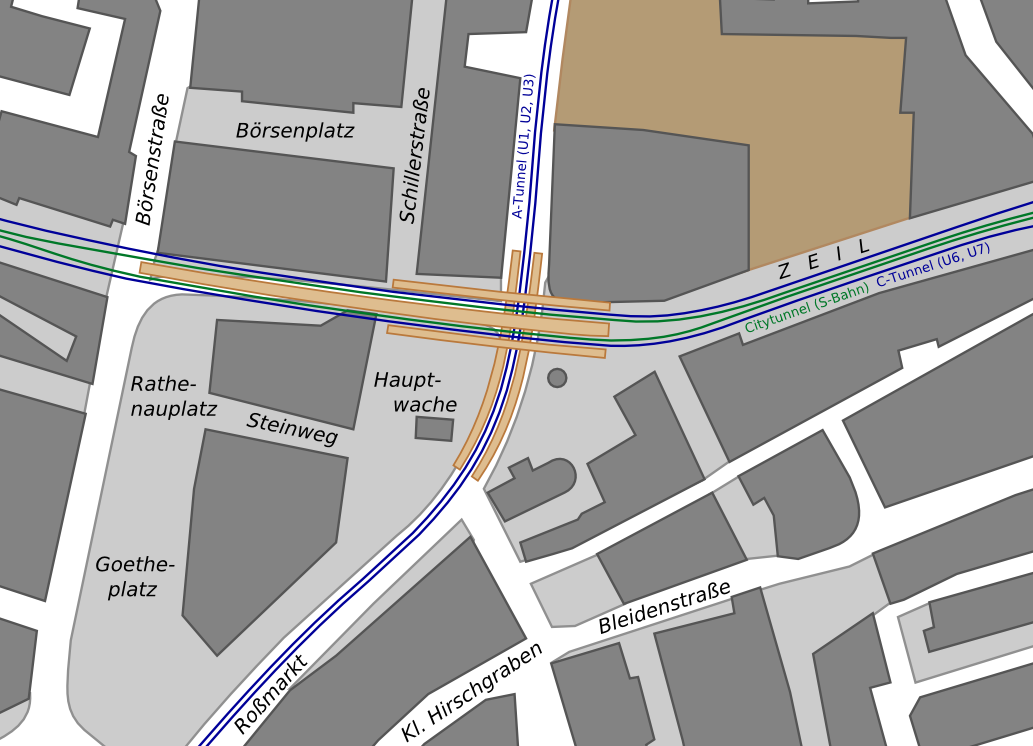
- Map of the station area

General information
- Location: An der Hauptwache 17, Frankfurt, Hesse; Germany
- Coordinates: 50°6′50″N 8°40′44″E
- Lines: Frankfurt City Tunnel; Frankfurt U-Bahn A Line; Frankfurt U-Bahn C Line
- Platforms: 5
- Tracks: 6 (4 U-Bahn, 2 S-Bahn)

Construction
- Accessible: Yes

Other information
- Station code: 1864
- DS100 code: FHAU
- IBNR: 8006692
- Category: 3
- Fare zone: : 5001
- Website: www.bahnhof.de

Passengers
- 2022: 93,000 daily

Services
Preceding station	Rhine-Main S-Bahn	Following station
Taunusanlage towards Wiesbaden Hbf	S1 (Rhine-Main S-Bahn)	Konstablerwache towards Rödermark-Ober Roden
Taunusanlage towards Niedernhausen	S2 (Rhine-Main S-Bahn)	Konstablerwache towards Dietzenbach
Taunusanlage towards Bad Soden	S3 (Rhine-Main S-Bahn)	Konstablerwache towards Südbahnhof
Taunusanlage towards Kronberg	S4 (Rhine-Main S-Bahn)	Konstablerwache towards Südbahnhof
Taunusanlage towards Friedrichsdorf	S5 (Rhine-Main S-Bahn)	Konstablerwache towards Südbahnhof
Taunusanlage towards Friedberg (Hess)	S6 (Rhine-Main S-Bahn)	Konstablerwache towards Darmstadt Hbf
Taunusanlage towards Wiesbaden Hbf	S8 (Rhine-Main S-Bahn)	Konstablerwache towards Hanau Hbf
Taunusanlage towards Wiesbaden Hbf	S9 (Rhine-Main S-Bahn)	Konstablerwache towards Hanau Hbf
Preceding station	Frankfurt U-Bahn	Following station
Eschenheimer Tor towards Ginnheim	U1	Willy-Brandt-Platz towards Südbahnhof
Eschenheimer Tor towards Bad Homburg-Gonzenheim	U2	Willy-Brandt-Platz towards Südbahnhof
Eschenheimer Tor towards Oberursel Hohemark	U3	Willy-Brandt-Platz towards Südbahnhof
Alte Oper towards Hausen	U6	Konstablerwache towards Frankfurt Ost
Alte Oper towards Praunheim Heerstr.	U7	Konstablerwache towards Enkheim
Eschenheimer Tor towards Ginnheim	U8	Willy-Brandt-Platz towards Südbahnhof
Location
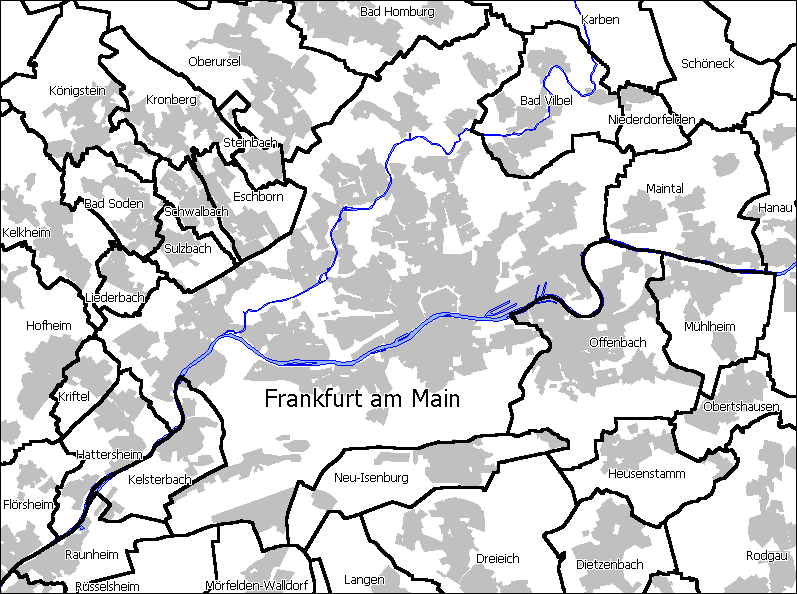
- Location within Frankfurt am Main Location within Hesse Location within Germany Location within Europe

Frankfurt (Main) Hauptwache station (German: Bahnhof Frankfurt (Main) Hauptwache) is a major train station situated at the Hauptwache square in the centre of Frankfurt, Germany.

As of 2022, with 93,000 passengers per day, Hauptwache station is the third-busiest rapid transit station in Frankfurt after Frankfurt Central Station and Konstablerwache station and a major hub for commuter transport in the Frankfurt/Rhine-Main region. It is served by eight S-Bahn lines (S1–S6, S8, S9) and six U-Bahn lines (U1–U3, U6–U8) on 2 levels.

== Location ==
The station is situated under the Hauptwache square at the western end of the Zeil, Frankfurt's main shopping street. Konstablerwache station is located at the eastern end of the Zeil.

== History ==
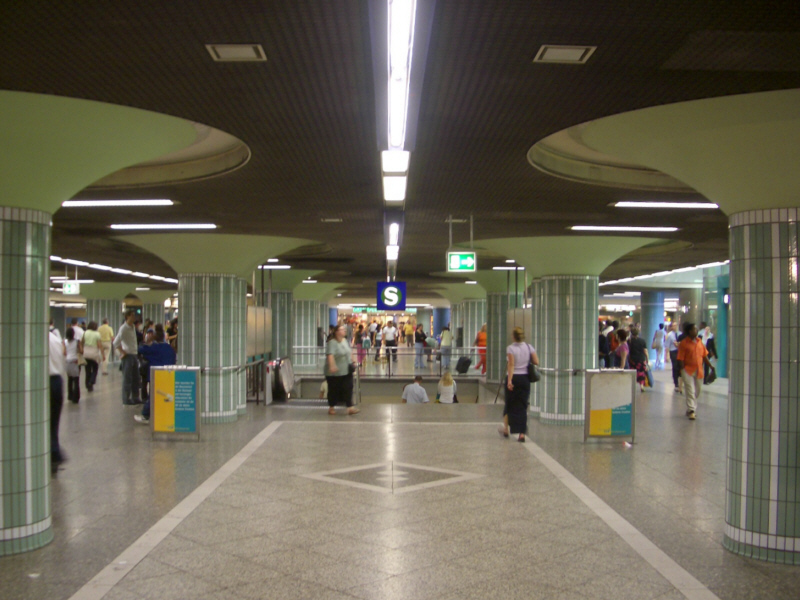
Shopping arcade and entrance to the station

In 1961 the Frankfurt city council agreed to build a U-Bahn network. Construction began in 1963 on a line between the Nordweststadt (a new housing estate in the north-western suburbs) and the city centre. The first section (part of the A Line) opened on 4 October 1968 from Nordweststadt to Hauptwache, which was the terminus of the tunnelled section until 1973, when it was extended south to Theaterplatz, now Willy-Brandt-Platz. This route is now used by trains on lines U1–U3 and U8.

The S-Bahn reached Hauptwache on 28 May 1978, when the first section of the City Tunnel from the central station to was opened. Hauptwache was the terminus of the S-Bahn until 1983, when the City Tunnel was extended to Konstablerwache, at the other end of the Zeil.

The east-west U-Bahn C Line (services U6 and U7) began running through Hauptwache in 1986, using platforms which had already been built at the same time as those for the S-Bahn.

In 1986 the tram line serving Hauptwache was closed.

== Station layout ==
The station has three underground levels. Immediately below the street is a distribution level with a shopping arcade. Below this are the platforms for the S-Bahn and the U-Bahn C Line (U6 and U7). This level has four tracks. The S-Bahn runs on the inner two tracks with an island platform and the U-Bahn uses the outer two tracks with two side platforms. The U-Bahn A Line (U1–U3 and U8) runs through the deepest level of the station on two tracks with side platforms.
