= Frankfurt Ostendstraße station =

Railway station in Frankfurt, Germany

Frankfurt Ostendstraße
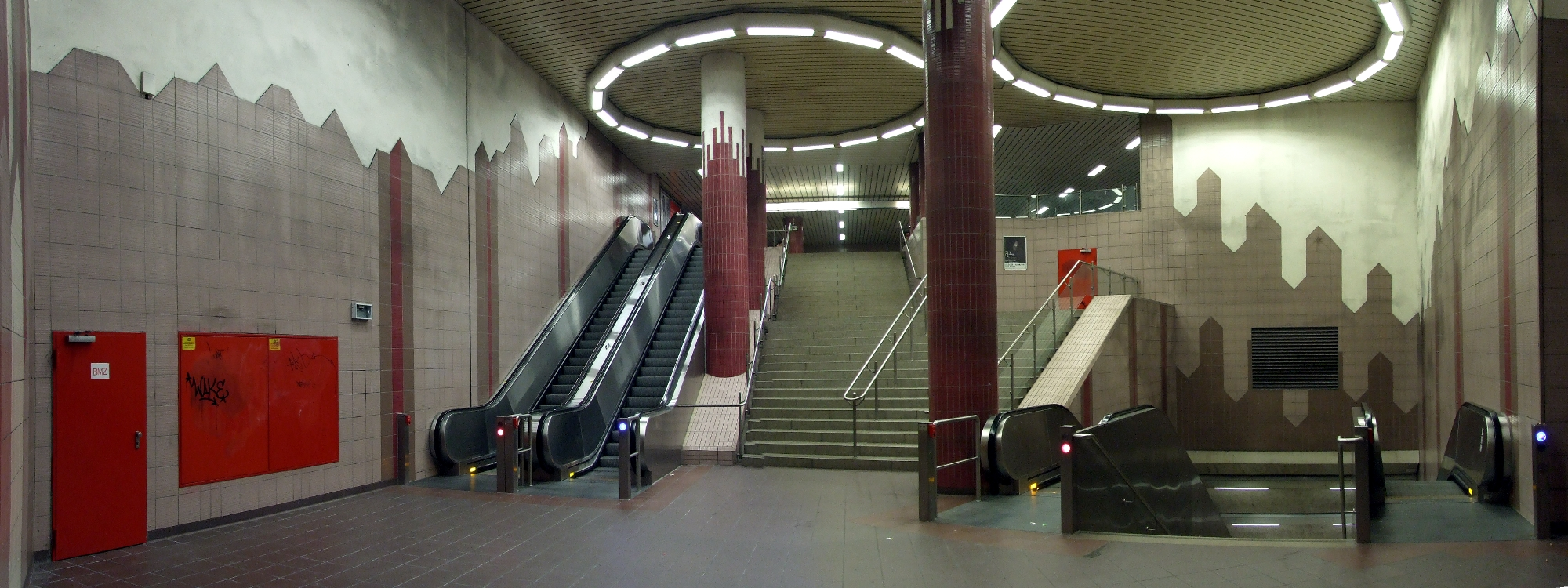
- Distribution level below the Hanauer Landstraße

General information
- Location: Uhlandstraße 57, Ostendstraße, Frankfurt am Main, Hesse; Germany
- Coordinates: 50°6′41″N 8°41′51″E
- Owner: Deutsche Bahn
- Operator: DB Netz; DB Station&Service
- Lines: Frankfurt City Tunnel (KBS 645.x)
- Platforms: 1 island platform
- Tracks: 2
- Train operators: S-Bahn Rhein-Main

Construction
- Accessible: No

Other information
- Station code: 1853
- DS100 code: FOST
- IBNR: 8002058
- Category: 3
- Fare zone: : 5001
- Website: www.bahnhof.de

History
- Opened: 1990

Services
Preceding station	Rhine-Main S-Bahn	Following station
Konstablerwache towards Wiesbaden Hbf	S1 (Rhine-Main S-Bahn)	Mühlberg towards Rödermark-Ober Roden
Konstablerwache towards Niedernhausen	S2 (Rhine-Main S-Bahn)	Mühlberg towards Dietzenbach
Konstablerwache towards Bad Soden	S3 (Rhine-Main S-Bahn)	Lokalbahnhof towards Südbahnhof
Konstablerwache towards Kronberg	S4 (Rhine-Main S-Bahn)	Lokalbahnhof towards Südbahnhof
Konstablerwache towards Friedrichsdorf	S5 (Rhine-Main S-Bahn)	Lokalbahnhof towards Südbahnhof
Konstablerwache towards Friedberg (Hess)	S6 (Rhine-Main S-Bahn)	Lokalbahnhof towards Darmstadt Hbf
Konstablerwache towards Wiesbaden Hbf	S8 (Rhine-Main S-Bahn)	Mühlberg towards Hanau Hbf
Konstablerwache towards Wiesbaden Hbf	S9 (Rhine-Main S-Bahn)	Mühlberg towards Hanau Hbf
Location

Frankfurt Ostendstraße station is an underground S-Bahn station in central Frankfurt am Main, Germany. The station was opened when the City Tunnel was extended to Frankfurt South station in 1990. It consists of two tracks, one each side of a central platform.

Its entrance escalators are located next to the Hanauer Landstraße. The Seat of the European Central Bank is nearby.

The train station is served by S-Bahn lines S1, S2, S3, S4, S5, S6, S8 and S9.
