= Frankfurt Mühlberg station =

Railway station in Frankfurt, Germany

Frankfurt (Main) Mühlberg
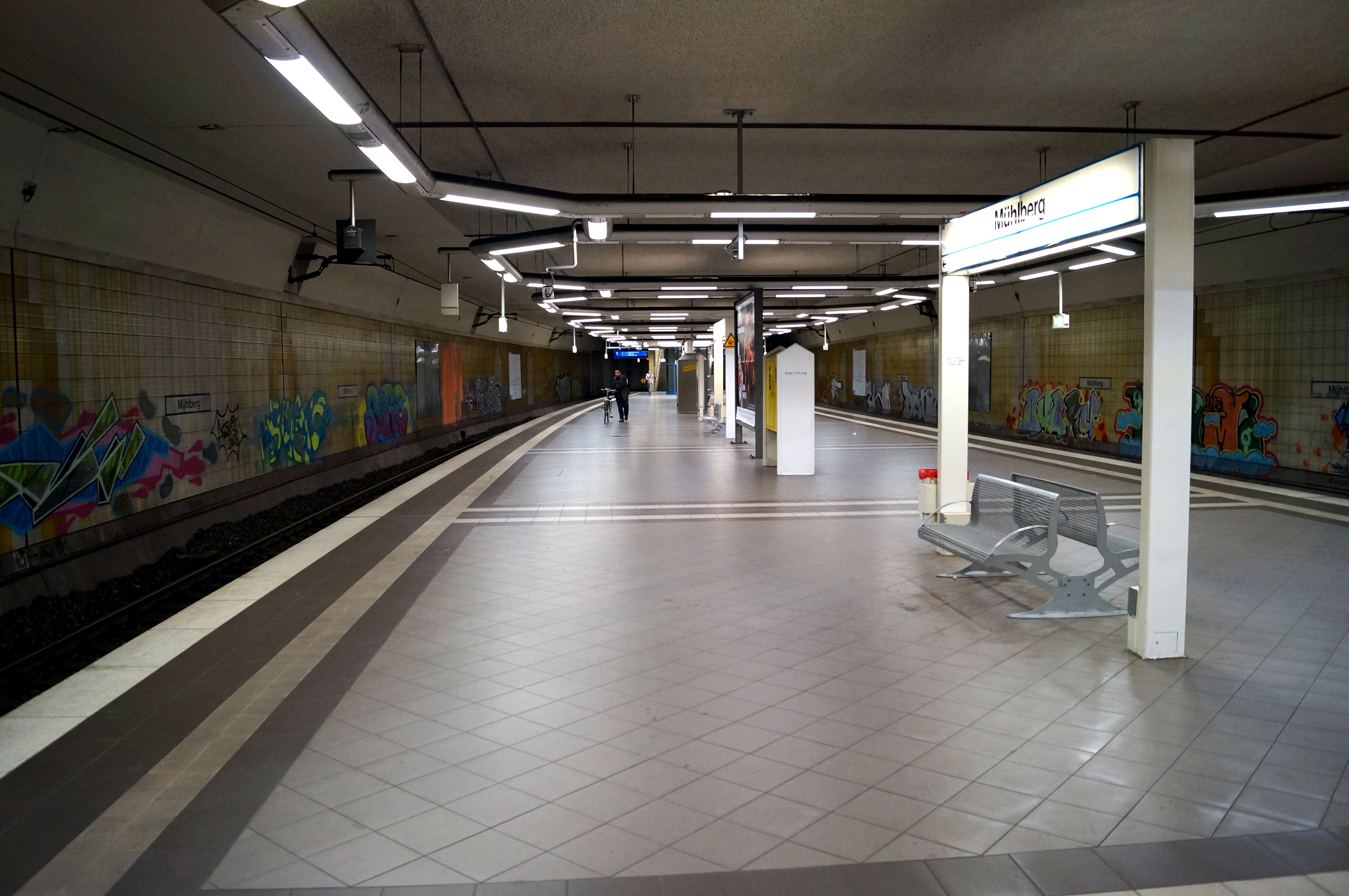
- 2012

General information
- Location: Offenbacher Landstr. 27, Frankfurt am Main, Hesse; Germany
- Coordinates: 50°6′6″N 8°42′1″E
- Owner: Deutsche Bahn
- Operator: DB Netz; DB Station&Service
- Lines: Frankfurt City Tunnel (54.4 km) (KBS 645.x)
- Platforms: 1 island platform
- Tracks: 2
- Train operators: S-Bahn Rhein-Main

Construction
- Accessible: Yes

Other information
- Station code: 1851
- DS100 code: FMUL
- IBNR: 8002034
- Category: 4
- Fare zone: : 5010
- Website: www.bahnhof.de

History
- Opened: 1992

Services
Preceding station	Rhine-Main S-Bahn	Following station
Ostendstraße towards Wiesbaden Hbf	S1 (Rhine-Main S-Bahn)	Kaiserlei towards Rödermark-Ober Roden
Ostendstraße towards Niedernhausen	S2 (Rhine-Main S-Bahn)	Kaiserlei towards Dietzenbach
Ostendstraße towards Wiesbaden Hbf	S8 (Rhine-Main S-Bahn)	Kaiserlei towards Hanau Hbf
Ostendstraße towards Wiesbaden Hbf	S9 (Rhine-Main S-Bahn)	Kaiserlei towards Hanau Hbf
Location

Frankfurt (Main) Mühlberg station is an underground Rhine-Main S-Bahn station on the Frankfurt City Tunnel in the Frankfurt district of Sachsenhausen in the German state of Hesse. The station is classified by Deutsche Bahn as a category 4 station. It was opened with the eastern part of the City Tunnel (which is called the Frankfurt–Mühlberg tunnel), which was opened in 1992 as the last section of the City Tunnel. It consists of two tracks on either side of an island platform.

The escalators down to the platform are located on Offenbacher Landstraße.

== Services ==
The station is served by S-Bahn lines S1, S2, S8, and S9.

Above the S-Bahn station is the Mühlberg station on lines 15 and 16 of the Frankfurt tram network. This station is also served by Frankfurt city bus route 46, and night bus routes n62 and n63.
