= Frankfurt Konstablerwache station =

Underground railway station in Frankfurt am Main

Frankfurt (Main) Konstablerwache
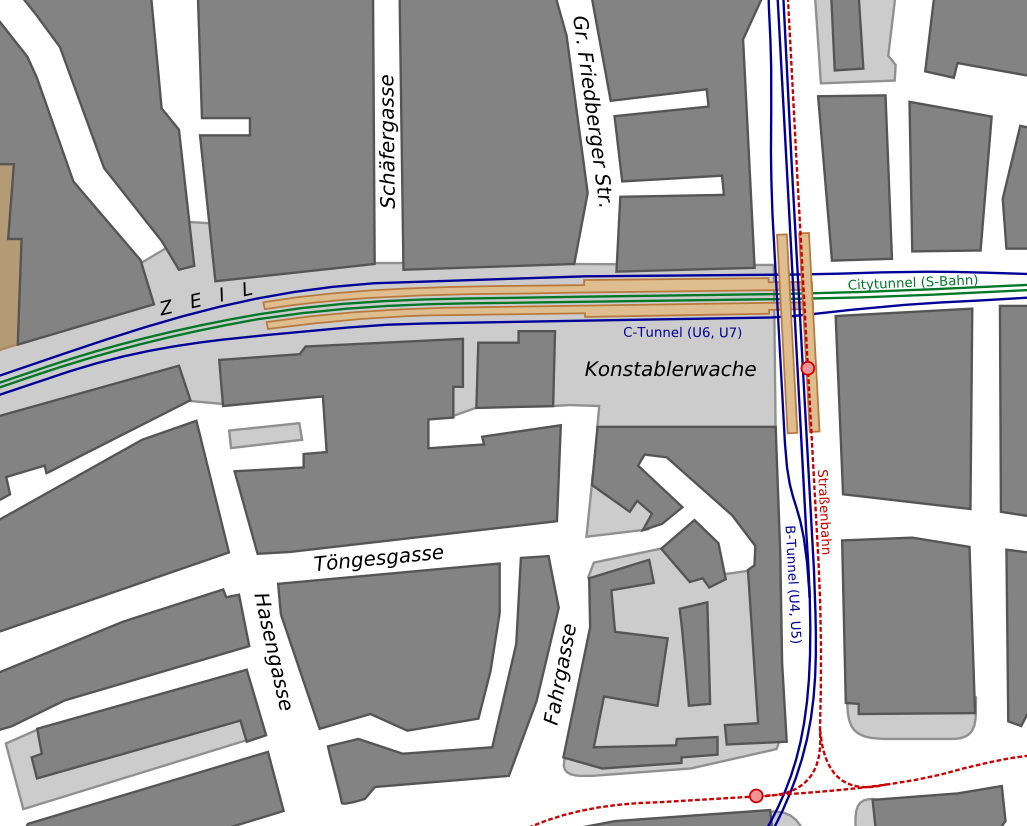
- Plan of the station area

General information
- Location: Konstablerwache, Frankfurt am Main, Hesse; Germany
- Coordinates: 50°6′53″N 8°41′11″E
- Lines: Frankfurt City Tunnel; Frankfurt U-Bahn B Line; Frankfurt U-Bahn C Line
- Platforms: 7 (5 U-Bahn and 2 S-Bahn)

Construction
- Accessible: Yes

Other information
- Station code: 1865
- DS100 code: FKON
- IBNR: 8004429
- Category: 3
- Fare zone: : 5001
- Website: www.bahnhof.de

History
- Opened: 26 May 1974

Passengers
- 98,000 daily

Services
Preceding station	Rhine-Main S-Bahn	Following station
Hauptwache towards Wiesbaden Hbf	S1 (Rhine-Main S-Bahn)	Ostendstraße towards Rödermark-Ober Roden
Hauptwache towards Niedernhausen	S2 (Rhine-Main S-Bahn)	Ostendstraße towards Dietzenbach
Hauptwache towards Bad Soden	S3 (Rhine-Main S-Bahn)	Ostendstraße towards Südbahnhof
Hauptwache towards Kronberg	S4 (Rhine-Main S-Bahn)	Ostendstraße towards Südbahnhof
Hauptwache towards Friedrichsdorf	S5 (Rhine-Main S-Bahn)	Ostendstraße towards Südbahnhof
Hauptwache towards Friedberg (Hess)	S6 (Rhine-Main S-Bahn)	Ostendstraße towards Darmstadt Hbf
Hauptwache towards Wiesbaden Hbf	S8 (Rhine-Main S-Bahn)	Ostendstraße towards Hanau Hbf
Hauptwache towards Wiesbaden Hbf	S9 (Rhine-Main S-Bahn)	Ostendstraße towards Hanau Hbf
Preceding station	Frankfurt U-Bahn	Following station
Dom/Römer towards Bockenheimer Warte	U4	Merianplatz towards Enkheim
Dom/Römer towards Frankfurt Hbf	U5	Musterschule towards Preungesheim
Hauptwache towards Hausen	U6	Zoo towards Frankfurt Ost
Hauptwache towards Praunheim Heerstr.	U7	Zoo towards Enkheim
Location
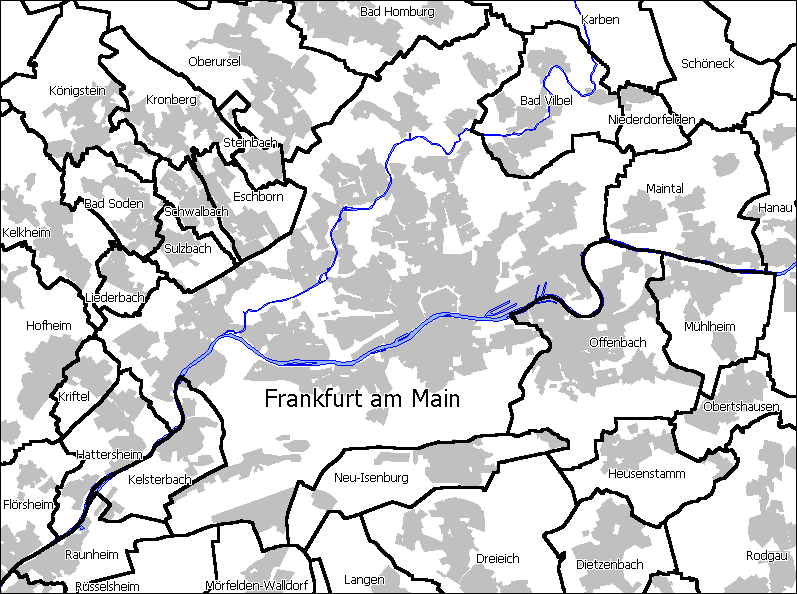
- Location within Frankfurt am Main Location within Hesse Location within Germany Location within Europe

Frankfurt am Main Konstablerwache station (German: Bahnhof Frankfurt am Main Konstablerwache) is a major train station and metro station at the Konstablerwache square in the city centre of Frankfurt am Main, Germany.

As of 2019, with 98,000 passengers per day, Konstablerwache station is the second busiest rapid transit station in Frankfurt after Frankfurt Central Station, and a major hub for commuter transport in the Frankfurt/Rhine-Main region. It is served by eight S-Bahn lines (S1–S6, S8, S9), four U-Bahn lines (U4-U7), two tram lines (12, 18) and two bus lines (30, 36).

== Location ==
The station is situated under the Konstablerwache at the eastern end of the Zeil, Frankfurt's main shopping street. Hauptwache station, the third busiest station in Frankfurt, is located at the western end of the Zeil.

== History ==
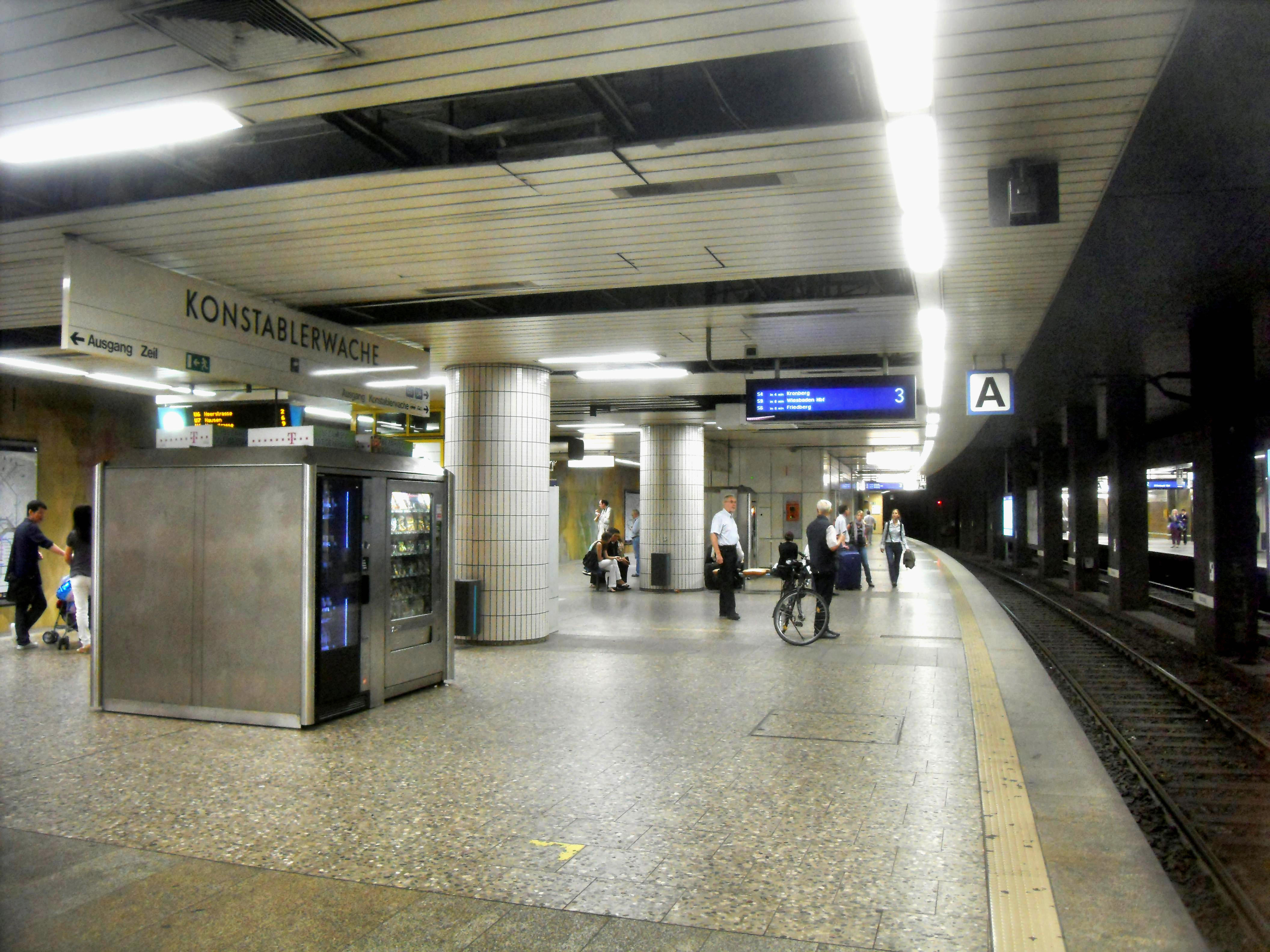
Level D with platform 3 for the S-Bahn (right) and the U-Bahn platform (left)

At the start of the 20th century, Konstablerwache was one of the key hubs of Frankfurt trams. The first part of the U-Bahn opened in 1968 and the B Line through Konstablerwache opened on 26 May 1974. In 1983, the S-Bahn City Tunnel was extended under the Zeil from Hauptwache to Konstablerwache. In 1986, the inauguration of operations through the Zeil tunnels was completed when the U6 and U7 services commenced on the C Line of the U-Bahn.

In 1978, tram operations were discontinued at Konstablerwache when the tram tracks along the Zeil were closed. In 1999, the first new tram line since U-Bahn construction began was opened along Kurt Schumacher and Konrad Adenauer streets. The route is served by lines 12 and 18.

== Station layout ==
As in the case of Hauptwache station, Konstablerwache has three underground levels. The first, level B, is a large distribution level. In addition to giving access to the platforms, it serves as a shopping mall and a pedestrian underpass. Below this is a section of a north-south road tunnel that was never completed.

One level below, on level C, is the three-platform station for the U-Bahn B Line, served by the U4 and U5. The western track is used by west-bound U5 trains towards Frankfurt Hauptbahnhof, the middle track is used by west-bound U4 trains towards Bockenheimer Warte, via the Hauptbahnhof. The eastern track is used by both U5 towards Preungesheim and U4 towards Seckbacher Landstraße.

Underneath, on level D, are the platforms for the S-Bahn and U-Bahn C Line (U6 and U7) through the City Tunnel. The S-Bahn runs on the inner two tracks and the U-Bahn on the outer two, with two island platforms to allow cross-platform interchange between them.

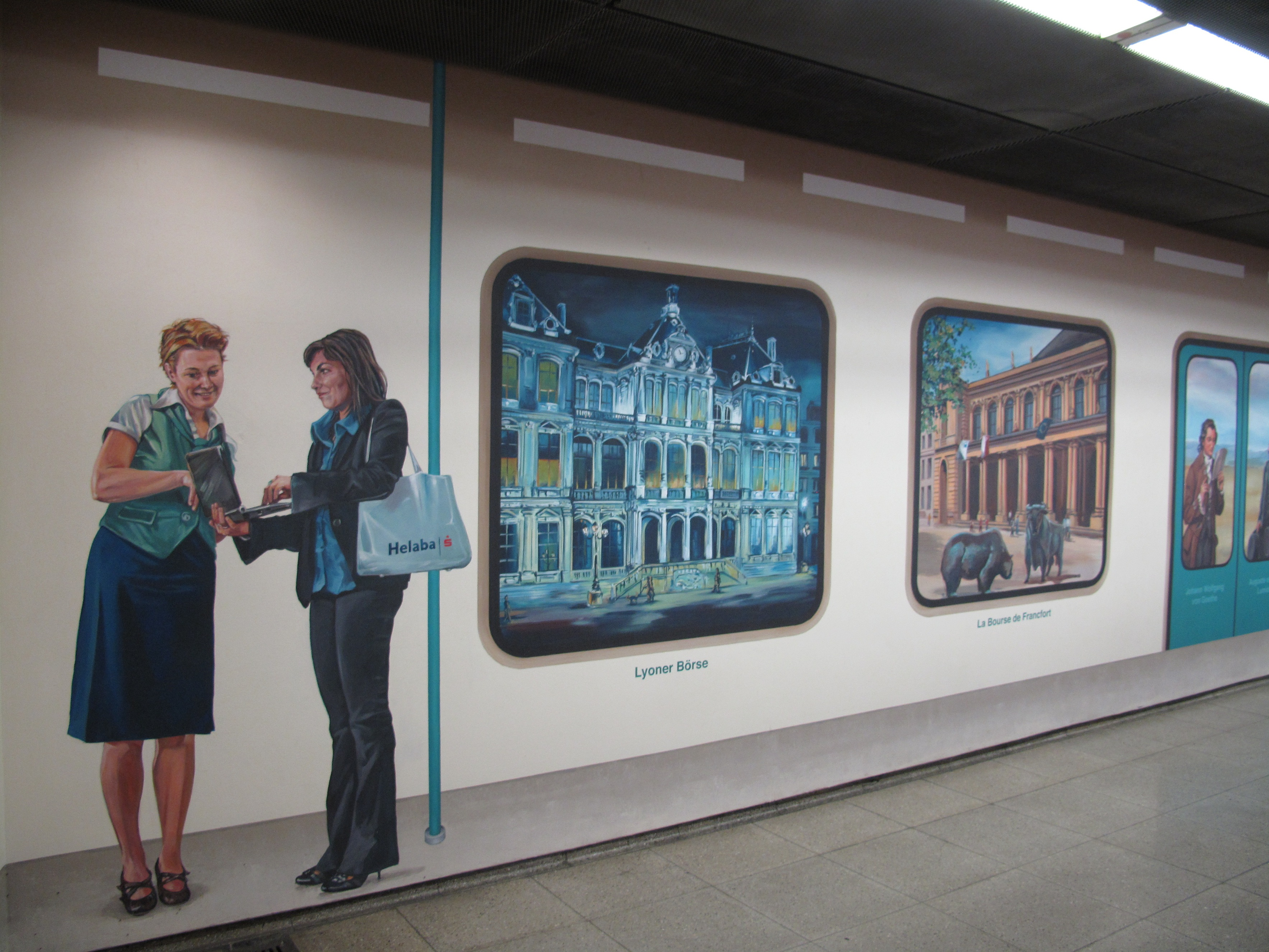
Trompe-l'œil, created in 2010 by CitéCréation

In 2010 the French artist group CitéCréation and its subsidiary CreativeStadt from Potsdam created a Trompe-l'œil in the metro station, titled "Reise in Raum und Zeit" (journey through space and time). The artwork was unveiled on 11 June 2010 to mark the 50th anniversary of the town twinning between Frankfurt and Lyon, and shows different scenes from Frankfurt and Lyon.
