= Frankfurt City Tunnel =

Railway tunnel in Frankfurt, Germany

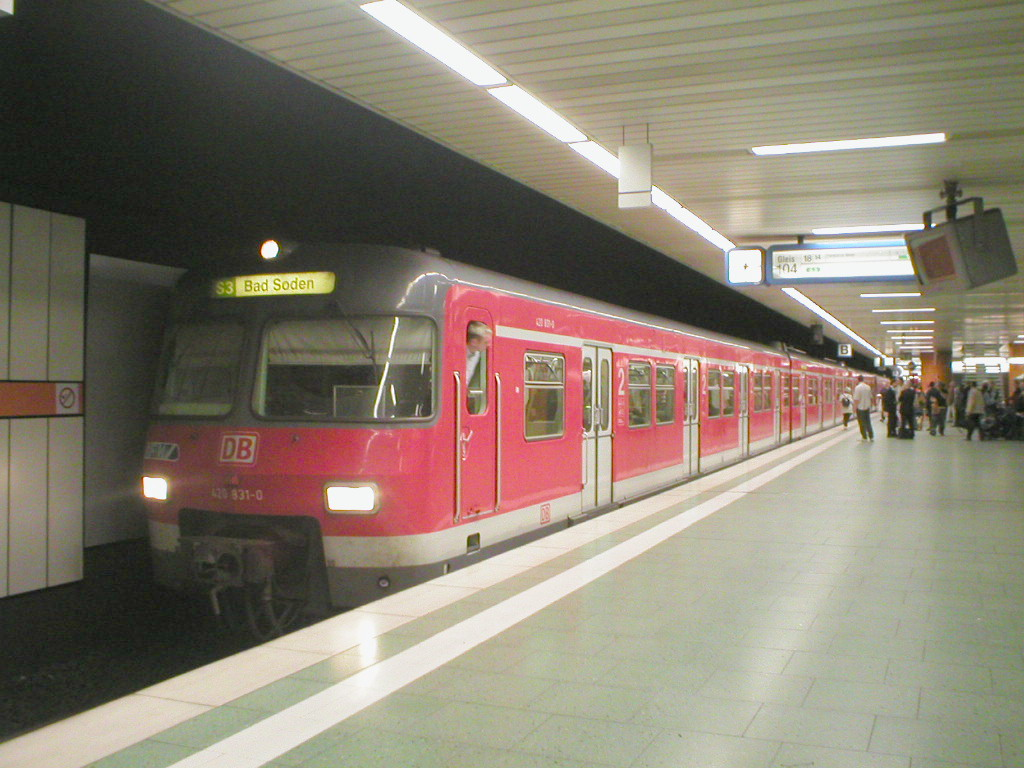
- train to Bad Soden at Hauptbahnhof low level, ET 420

Overview
- Native name: City-Tunnel Frankfurt
- Line number: 3681 (from Hbf); 3682 (to Hbf); 3680 (Schlachthof–Offenbach)
- Locale: Frankfurt, Hesse, Germany

Service
- Route number: 645.2, 645.5, 645.6

Technical
- Line length: 6.36 km (3.95 mi)
- Track gauge: 1,435 mm (4 ft 8 1/2 in) standard gauge
- Electrification: 15 kV/16.7 Hz AC overhead catenary

The Frankfurt City Tunnel is a standard gauge railway in Frankfurt and the core of the Rhine-Main S-Bahn. The line runs underground for its entire length.

== Central Station to Konstablerwache ==
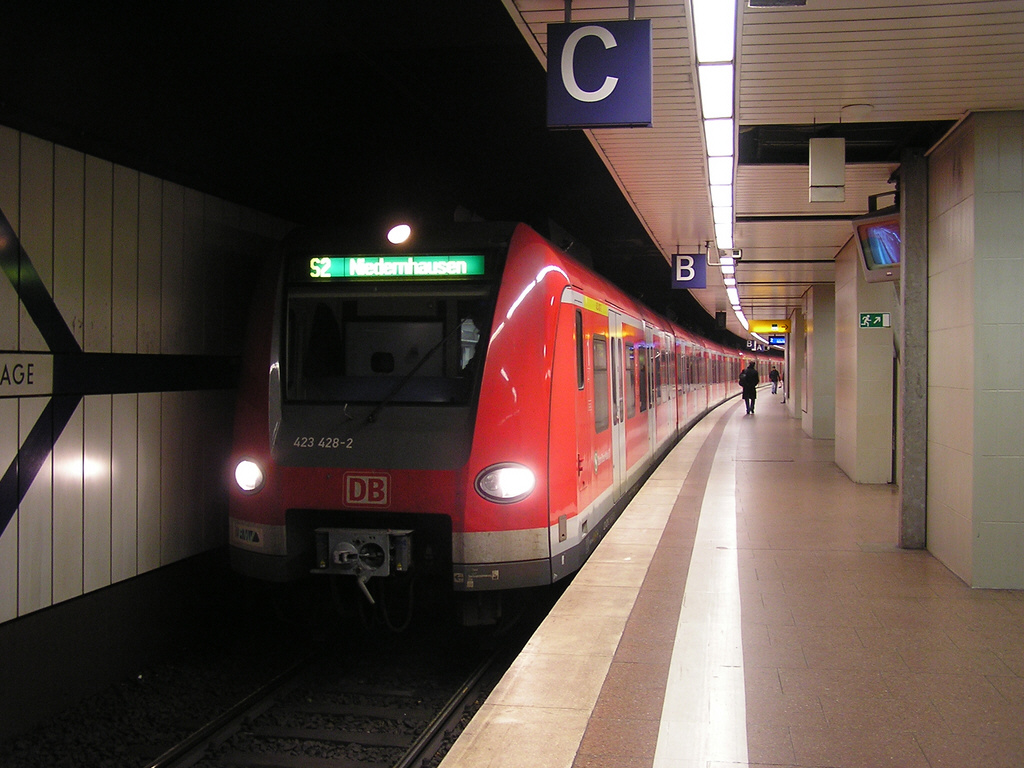
train at Taunusanlage station

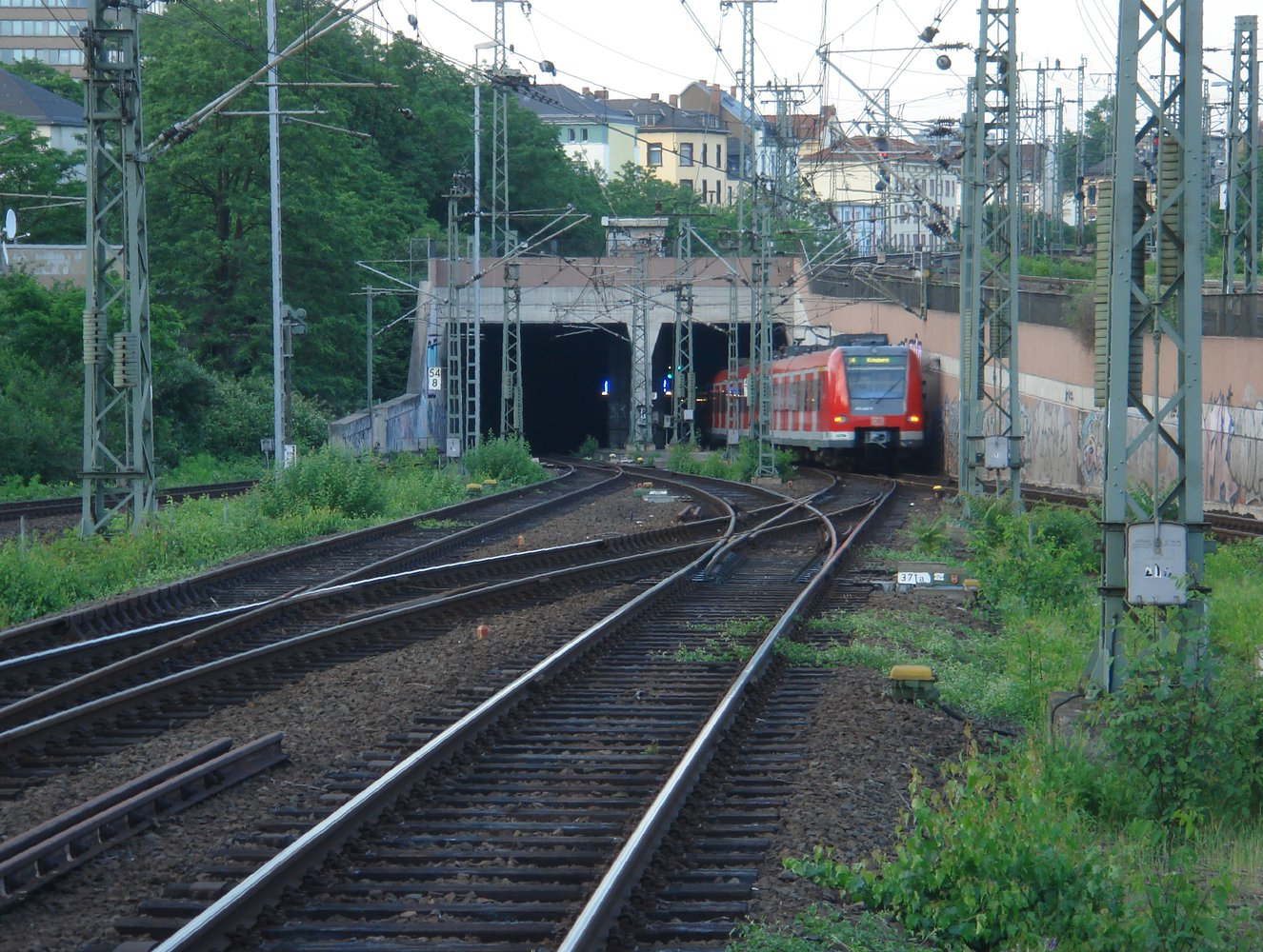
Entrance to City Tunnel near Frankfurt South station

The first section was put into operation on 28 May 1978 to Hauptwache. S-Bahn trains began operating on the Taunus Railway (S1), the Main-Lahn Railway (S2), the Limes Railway (S3), the Kronberg Railway (S4), the Homburg Railway (S5) and the Main-Weser Railway (S6) after climbing a ramp under the former postal station in the tunnel and reached the surface about 500 metres (1,600 ft) east of the central station. The Main Railway service (S14, now S8), was introduced shortly later.

The line runs northeast for about 700 metres (2,300 ft) from the central station to Taunusanlage station, built on the site of the old city walls near the Alte Oper and the Deutsche Bank Twin Towers. The tunnel bends to the east and after 250 metres (820 ft) it joins Tunnel C of the Frankfurt U-Bahn, which was built together with the City Tunnel under the Freßgass (the pedestrianised streets of Kalbächer Gasse and Große Bockenheimer Straße, named after its eateries) to Hauptwache. In 1983, the city tunnel was extended, largely in a cut and cover tunnel, 600 metres (2,000 ft) to the east beneath the Zeil to Konstablerwache. This section is also a joint tunnel with the U-Bahn; the S-Bahn lines run between the U-Bahn lines.

The tunnel has a train frequency of roughly 28 trains per hour in each direction, that is one train every two minutes. During the rush hour the frequency is approximately one train every two minutes.

== Tunnelling under the Main ==
The next major phase of construction followed in 1990 when the line was extended in a southeasterly direction. Ostendstraße station was built between the streets of Hanauer Landstrasse and Ostendstraße. 300 metres (980 ft) further south the route crosses the Main. The tunnel was built by digging a trench in the river bottom and sinking the tunnel tubes into it, half the river at a time. After passing under the Main the tunnel divides: One branch runs in the direction of Sachsenhausen where it runs under the Sachsenhausen old town to Frankfurt Lokalbahnhof and then climbs a ramp to the embankment of the South Main railway to Frankfurt South station. At the South station the S-Bahn connects with regional and main line services was built, trams and the U-Bahn.

The second section, which was completed in 1992, branches off to the east on the Sachsenhausen side after the passage under the Main towards Mühlberg. Then the line comes to the surface prior for a few kilometres until the next station at Offenbach-Kaiserlei where the Offenbach City Tunnel begins. This underground section has three underground stations and ends at Offenbach Ost station, where the Rodgau line branches off.

== Branch to Ostbahnhof ==
Between Konstablerwache and Ostendstraße stations the entrance for a tunnel branching towards Frankfurt East station was built for the proposed north Main branch of the S-Bahn to Hanau.
