= Rhine-Main S-Bahn =

Public transit system in Germany

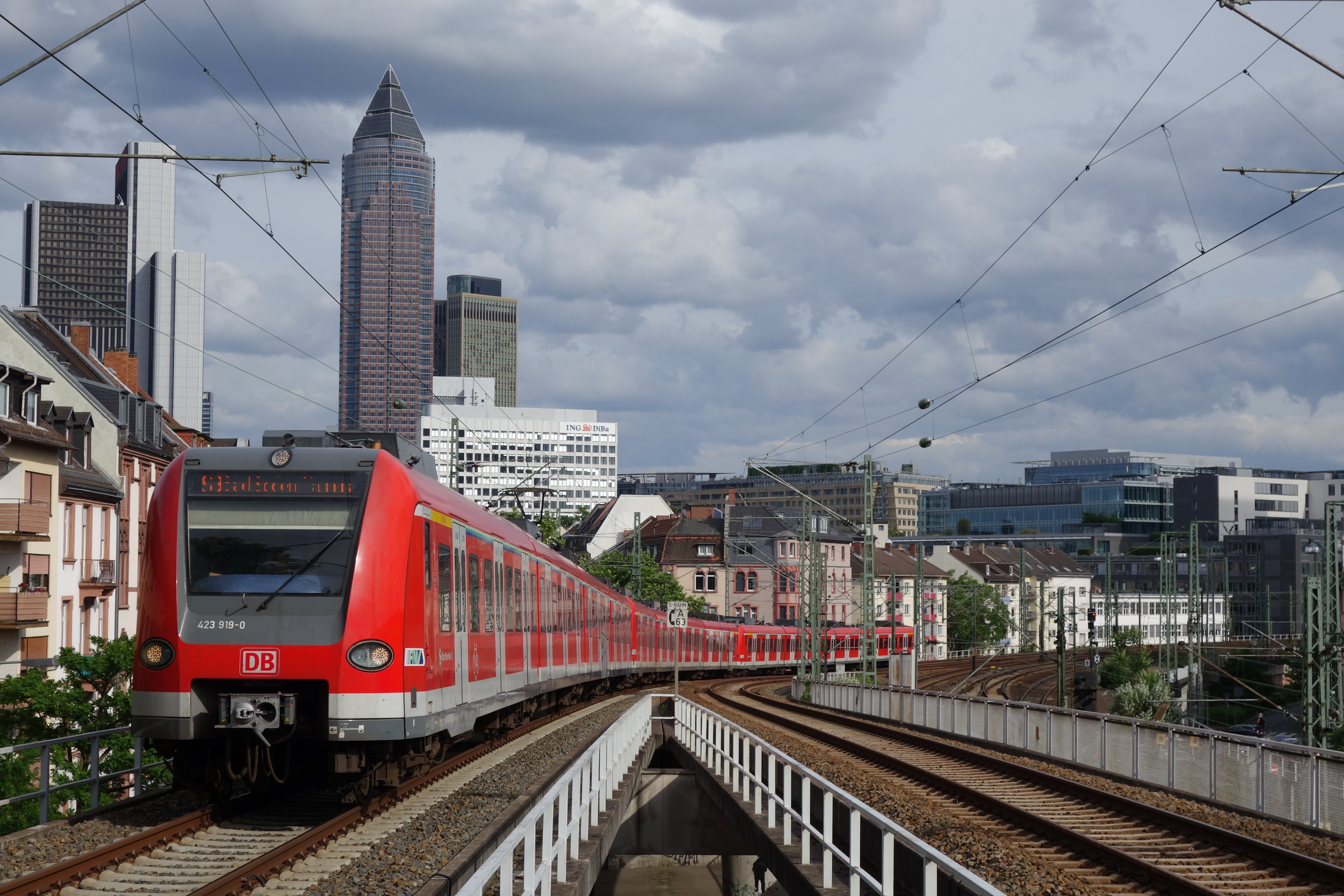
- DBAG Class 423 approaching the elevated section of Frankfurt Westbahnhof

Overview
- Number of lines: 9
- Number of stations: 112 (13 underground)
- Annual ridership: 150 million

Operation
- Number of vehicles: DBAG Class 423; DBAG Class 430

Technical
- System length: 303 km (188 mi)
System map

The Rhine-Main S-Bahn system is an integrated rapid transit and commuter train system for the Frankfurt/Rhine-Main region, which includes the cities Frankfurt am Main, Wiesbaden, Mainz, Offenbach am Main, Hanau and Darmstadt. The network comprises nine S-Bahn lines, eight of which currently travel through the cornerstone of the system, a tunnel (the "City Tunnel") through central Frankfurt. The first section of this tunnel was opened on May 28, 1978. Further tunnel sections were opened in 1983 and 1990, before its completion in 1992. The system belongs to the Rhein-Main-Verkehrsverbund (RMV) and is operated by DB Regio, a subsidiary of Deutsche Bahn.

End-to-end journey times on the nine lines in the system range from 36 minutes (on line S7) up to 87 minutes (on line S1). The longest journey time into central Frankfurt (Hauptwache), from any point on the network, is 54 minutes. Services on some lines start shortly after 4 a.m., while all lines have services from about 5 a.m. onwards. A full service is maintained from 6 a.m. until about 8 p.m., and a somewhat reduced service is run until the late evening. The last services leave Frankfurt at 2:12 a.m. The S8/S9 runs 24/7.

The S-Bahn system is quite closely integrated with other components of the region's transport system, such as the bus services in the various cities and towns, the tram services in Mainz, Frankfurt and Darmstadt, and the Frankfurt U-Bahn. In Frankfurt, connections can be made, at either Hauptwache or its neighbouring station Konstablerwache, between the eight cross-city S-Bahn lines and eight of the city's nine U-Bahn lines, while the S-Bahn stations Frankfurt Hauptbahnhof and Frankfurt Süd between them have connection to six of the U-Bahn lines and any of the city's tram lines. Some opportunities for interchange also exist in the suburbs of Frankfurt.

== Lines ==
Since the end of 2024, the system comprises the following lines:

Line	Route
S1 (Rhine-Main S-Bahn)	Wiesbaden – Frankfurt-Höchst – Frankfurt – Citytunnel – Offenbach Ost – Rödermark-Ober Roden
S2 (Rhine-Main S-Bahn)	Niedernhausen – Frankfurt-Höchst – Frankfurt – Citytunnel – Offenbach Ost – Dietzenbach
S3 (Rhine-Main S-Bahn)	Bad Soden – Frankfurt-West – Frankfurt – Citytunnel – Frankfurt-Süd
S4 (Rhine-Main S-Bahn)	Kronberg – Frankfurt-West – Frankfurt – Citytunnel – Frankfurt-Süd
S5 (Rhine-Main S-Bahn)	Friedrichsdorf – Frankfurt-West – Frankfurt – Citytunnel – Frankfurt-Süd
S6 (Rhine-Main S-Bahn)	Friedberg – Groß Karben – Frankfurt-West – Frankfurt – Citytunnel – Langen – Darmstadt
S7 (Rhine-Main S-Bahn)	Riedstadt-Goddelau – Groß-Gerau Dornberg – Frankfurt Hauptbahnhof
S8 (Rhine-Main S-Bahn)	Wiesbaden – Mainz – Frankfurt Airport – Frankfurt – Citytunnel – Offenbach Ost – Hanau
S9 (Rhine-Main S-Bahn)	Wiesbaden – Mainz-Kastel – Frankfurt Airport – Frankfurt – Citytunnel – Offenbach Ost – Hanau

There are hardly any trains going all the way from Friedberg to Darmstadt, such that line S6 is composed by trains Friedberg – Langen und trains Groß Karben – Darmstadt. From 2003–2024, line S6 terminated at Frankfut-Süd station instead, while line S3 continued to Darmstadt and line S4 continued to Langen.

The former routes are as follows:

Line	Route	Notes
S 14	Wiesbaden ↔ Mainz ↔ Frankfurt Flughafen Regionalbahnhof ↔ Frankfurt Hbf ↔ Frankfurt Süd	replaced by S8
S 15	Frankfurt Flughafen Regionalbahnhof ↔ Frankfurt Hbf	replaced by S8/S9
S 13	Goddelau-Erfelden ↔ Frankfurt Hbf	replaced by S7
S 12	Frankfurt Hbf ↔ Langen ↔ Darmstadt	replaced by S3/S4
S 11	Frankfurt Hbf ↔ Dreieich ↔ Rödermark-Ober-Roden	replaced by Dreieichbahn
S 9	Offenbach Hbf ↔ Rödermark-Ober-Roden	replaced by S1
S 8	Frankfurt Hbf ↔ Frankfurt Süd ↔ Offenbach ↔ Hanau	replaced by S8/S9
S 7	Frankfurt Hbf ↔ Frankfurt Süd ↔ Maintal ↔ Hanau	replaced by nordmainischen S-Bahn

== History ==
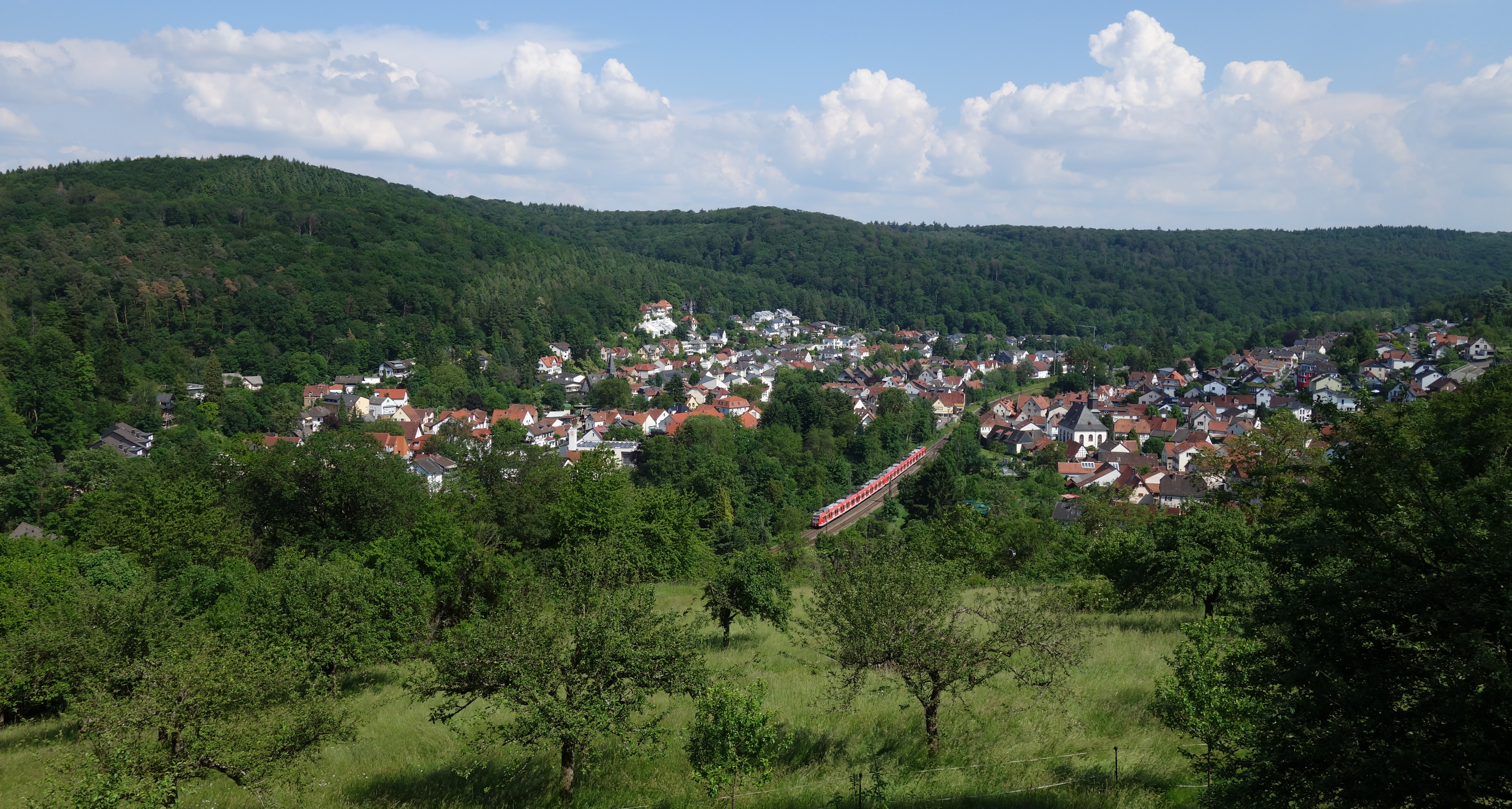
DB class 423 as S2 heading for Niedernhausen passing Hofheim-Lorsbach

=== The early years ===
Plans for a rail connection between the central rail station (Hauptbahnhof) in Frankfurt and the Hauptwache, the central commuter destination in the city, were started in the early 1960s. Construction work on the project started in 1969. During the construction phase, some rearrangements were carried out to the commuter network in the area around Frankfurt, including creation of a link line between Bad Soden am Taunus and Niederhöchstadt.

In 1978 the first section of the "Citytunnel" of the Rhine-Main S-Bahn was opened, with all lines sharing the tunnel between Hauptbahnhof and Hauptwache. The initial system, which lay entirely to the north of the river Main, comprised the following lines:

- S1: Wiesbaden Hbf – Höchst – Hauptbahnhof – Hauptwache
- S2: Niedernhausen – Höchst – Hauptbahnhof – Hauptwache
- S3: Frankfurt-Höchst – Bad Soden – Frankfurt West – Hauptbahnhof – Hauptwache
- S4: Kronberg – Frankfurt West – Hauptbahnhof – Hauptwache
- S5: Friedrichsdorf – Frankfurt West – Hauptbahnhof – Hauptwache
- S6: Friedberg – Frankfurt West – Hauptbahnhof – Hauptwache

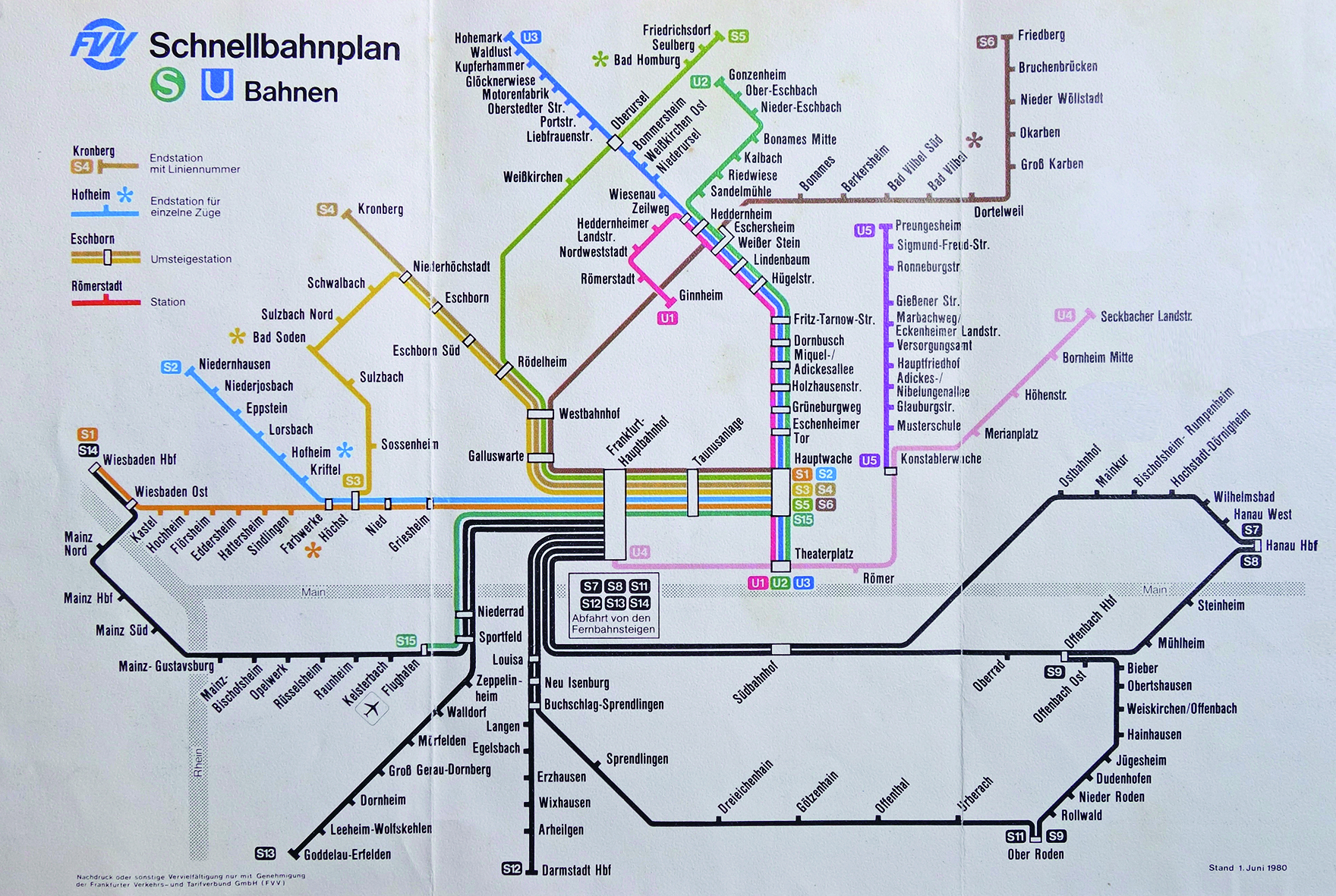
S-Bahn- and U-Bahn lines in 1980

In 1980, two further lines were added to the network, made possible by construction of a new rail bridge over the river Main:

- S14: Wiesbaden – Mainz – Flughafen – Hauptbahnhof (main arrivals hall)
- S15: Flughafen – Hauptbahnhof – Hauptwache

Completion in 1983 of a 600m long easterly extension of the Citytunnel, as far as Konstablerwache, improved the opportunities for train turnaround in the tunnel. At this stage lines S1–S6 and line S14 were extended to Konstablerwache, while the S15 was rerouted to the main arrivals hall of the Hauptbahnhof.

=== Later Developments ===
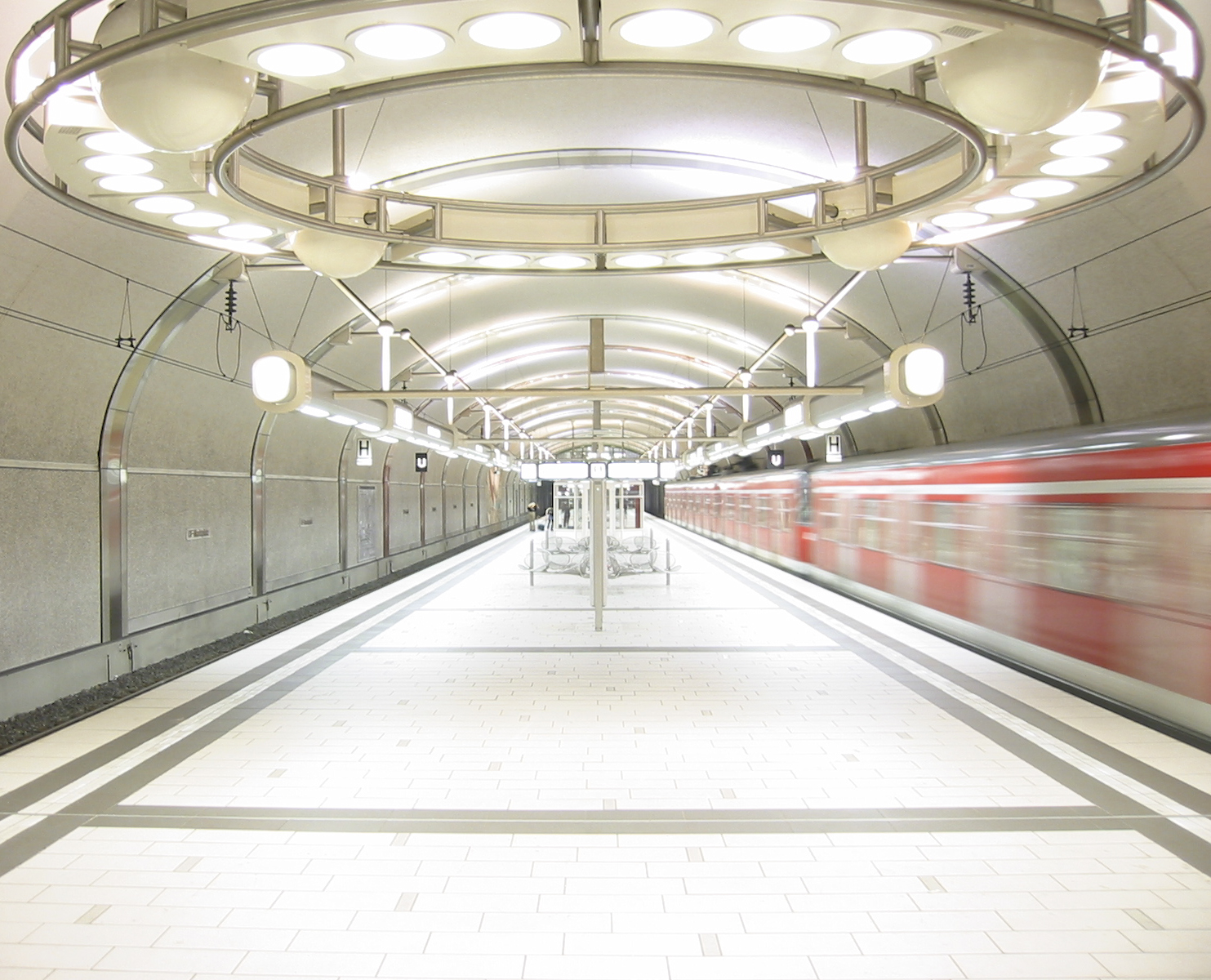
City-Tunnel Offenbach am Main

In 1990 the Citytunnel was extended, adding the underground stations Ostendstrasse and Lokalbahnhof to the system, along with the overground station Frankfurt Süd. All the lines (with the exception of the S15) were extended to Frankfurt Süd, while the S5 and S6 were further extended a short time later to a new station at Stresemannallee, south-west of Frankfurt Süd.

In 1992, S1 and S2 trains were diverted to the new Mühlberg underground station, the first station in the direction of Offenbach. This left the S3, S4, S5 and S6 serving all the stations between Hauptbahnhof and Frankfurt Süd, a situation which still pertains to this day. The S14, which is now the S8, also served all of these stations. In 1995, the newly instituted RMV increased train frequency from a 20/40/60 minute schedule (depending on the time of day) to the 15/30/45/60 minute schedule which is still used in the system. The S15 ceased operations at this stage.

Also in 1995, a new underground alignment through the city of Offenbach was opened, assisting the rerouting of the S14 (renamed the S8) through Mühlberg to City-Tunnel Offenbach and Hanau. The S1 was also extended as far as Offenbach, while the S2 returned to serving Frankfurt Süd. In 1997, the routes of the S5 and S6 were shortened slightly, so that they travelled only as far as Frankfurt Süd, while the S3 and S4 were extended to Darmstadt and Langen. The section of the S3 between Höchst and Bad Soden im Taunus also ceased to be served by S-Bahn trains.

In 1999, the S8 was effectively divided into two lines, the S8 and S9, both of which travel between Hanau and Wiesbaden via Bischofsheim. The S8 continues to travel through the centre of Mainz, while the S9 travels via Mainz-Kastel. This arrangement means that it is possible to travel between Wiesbaden, the capital of the state of Hesse, and Frankfurt, the state's largest city, by three different routes. In the same year, a new station on lines S3-S6 was opened in the Frankfurt fairground (Frankfurt Messe station).

In 2002, a new S-Bahn line, the S7, between Frankfurt Hauptbahnhof (main arrivals hall) and Riedstadt-Goddelau was added to the system (replacing the regional train line on the northern part of the Mannheim–Frankfurt railway). Due to a shortage of capacity in the Citytunnel, these trains are not currently able to reach Frankfurt's inner city. At present, these trains do not operate on a 30-minute schedule because of several ICE lines that operate on the same tracks.

In 2003 the Rodgaubahn, a commuter rail system serving Offenbach and its environs, was incorporated into the Rhine-Main S-Bahn system. This resulted in the S1 being extended from Offenbach Ost to Rödermark-Ober Roden, while the S2 was also rerouted from Frankfurt Süd to serve Offenbach Ost and all stations to its new terminus in Dietzenbach.

The current system has an almost 5-minute frequency for services between Frankfurt and Offenbach Ost and an actual 5-minute frequency for services between Frankfurt Hauptbahnhof and Frankfurt Süd. The group of lines S1, S2, S8 and S9 all share 10 stations, as do the group of lines S3, S4, S5 and S6. All the lines, with the exception of the S7, share 5 stations. Initially this arrangement gave rise to some considerable delays caused by poorly functioning signalling. To some extent this has been allayed by routing every second westbound S2 train in peak times to Offenbach am Main (Hauptbahnhof) and every second eastbound S2 train in peak times to the main arrivals hall of the Frankfurt Hauptbahnhof, rather than running these services through the Citytunnel. Reconstruction of the signalling technology in the Citytunnel enabled all westbound S2 trains to travel all the way to Niedernhausen at a frequency of 15 minutes in 2010.

Since 2015 a new signal tower for the Citytunnel is installed at Frankfurt Hauptbahnhof which is going to replace the original signal tower operating since 1978 in 2018. Therefore, it is necessary to close the tunnel several times between 2015 and 2018 for between two and six weeks each, mostly during school holidays. The times of service closure are also used to modernize the stations in the tunnel.

From July 31 to August 18, 2006, the mainline tunnel between the main station and Konstablerwache was completely closed to exchange 30 switches. On May 13, 2007, the served by the S2, new breakpoint Frankfurt Zeilsheim was opened, on 31 October 2008, operated by the S3, single-track breakpoint Schwalbach North.

For the timetable change 2017/18, a continuous night traffic was introduced on weekends. Due to nocturnal blockages of the City Tunnel, the railways go in a first phase at night on modified lines:

- S1: Wiesbaden Hbf - Hochheim (Main) - Frankfurt-Höchst - Frankfurt (Main) Hbf - Frankfurt (Main) South - Offenbach (Main) Main Station - Rödermark-Ober-Roden
- S3: Frankfurt (Main) South - Langen (Hesse) - Darmstadt Hbf
- S4: Kronberg (Taunus) - Eschborn - Frankfurt (Main) West - Frankfurt (Main) Hbf
- S5: Friedrichsdorf - Bad Homburg - Oberursel (Taunus) - Frankfurt (Main) West - Frankfurt (Main) Hbf
- S8: Wiesbaden Hbf - Mainz central station - Rüsselsheim - Frankfurt airport - Frankfurt (Main) Hbf - Frankfurt (Main) south - Offenbach (Main) central station - Hanau central station

From August 2018, the start of operations of the entire night traffic in the Citytunnel is planned. From December 2018 the S8/S9 will be 24/7 through the Citytunnel with a 30-minute frequency between 1:00 am and 4:30 am from Frankfurt Flughafen Regionalbahnhof to Konstablerwache (1:11 am/4:11 am from Konstablerwache to Frankfurt Flughafen Regionalbahnhof) and a 60-minute frequency between 12:49 am and 3:49 am from Wiesbaden Hbf and Hanau Hbf (1:46 am/3:46 am from Hanau Hbf to Wiesbaden Hbf)

== Bridges ==
The S-Bahn crosses three of the four largest rivers in the region, with a total of nine bridges and a tunnel.

Line S8 crosses the Rhine twice, namely over the Kaiserbrücke between Mainz Nord and Wiesbaden Ost stations and the South bridge between Mainz Römisches Theater and Mainz-Gustavsburg stations.

The S-Bahn crosses the Main in five places, with all lines crossing the river at least once. The S8 to Hanau crosses the Main three times and the S9 four times. Lines S8 and S9 cross the river via the Steinheimer Mainbrücke, between the Hanau and Steinheim stations. The Frankfurt City Tunnel, used by all lines except S7, crosses under the Main between Ostendstraße and Lokalbahnhof or Mühlberg with a junction located approximately under the southern riverbank. Between Frankfurt Hauptbahnhof and Niederrad the S7 crosses the Main on the Alte Niederräder Brücke and lines S8 and S9 on the immediately adjacent Neue Niederräder Brücke. Line S9 crosses the Main again at Hochheim, between Mainz-Bischofsheim and Mainz-Kastel, to reach Wiesbaden without going via Mainz Hauptbahnhof.

The Nidda is crossed in three places, with each of the lines S1 to S6 crossing it once. The newer of the two railway bridges in Frankfurt-Nied is crossed by lines S1 and S2 and lines S3-S5 cross the Nidda between Frankfurt West and Rödelheim stations. Line S6 runs partly next to the Nidda, but crosses it only once between the stations of Bad Vilbel and Bad Vilbel Süd.

The fourth major river in the region, the Kinzig, currently has no contact with the S-Bahn network. This will only change with the construction of the North-Main S-Bahn line to Hanau, as the existing Frankfurt-Hanau line crosses the Kinzig just north of Hanau West station.

== Tunnels ==
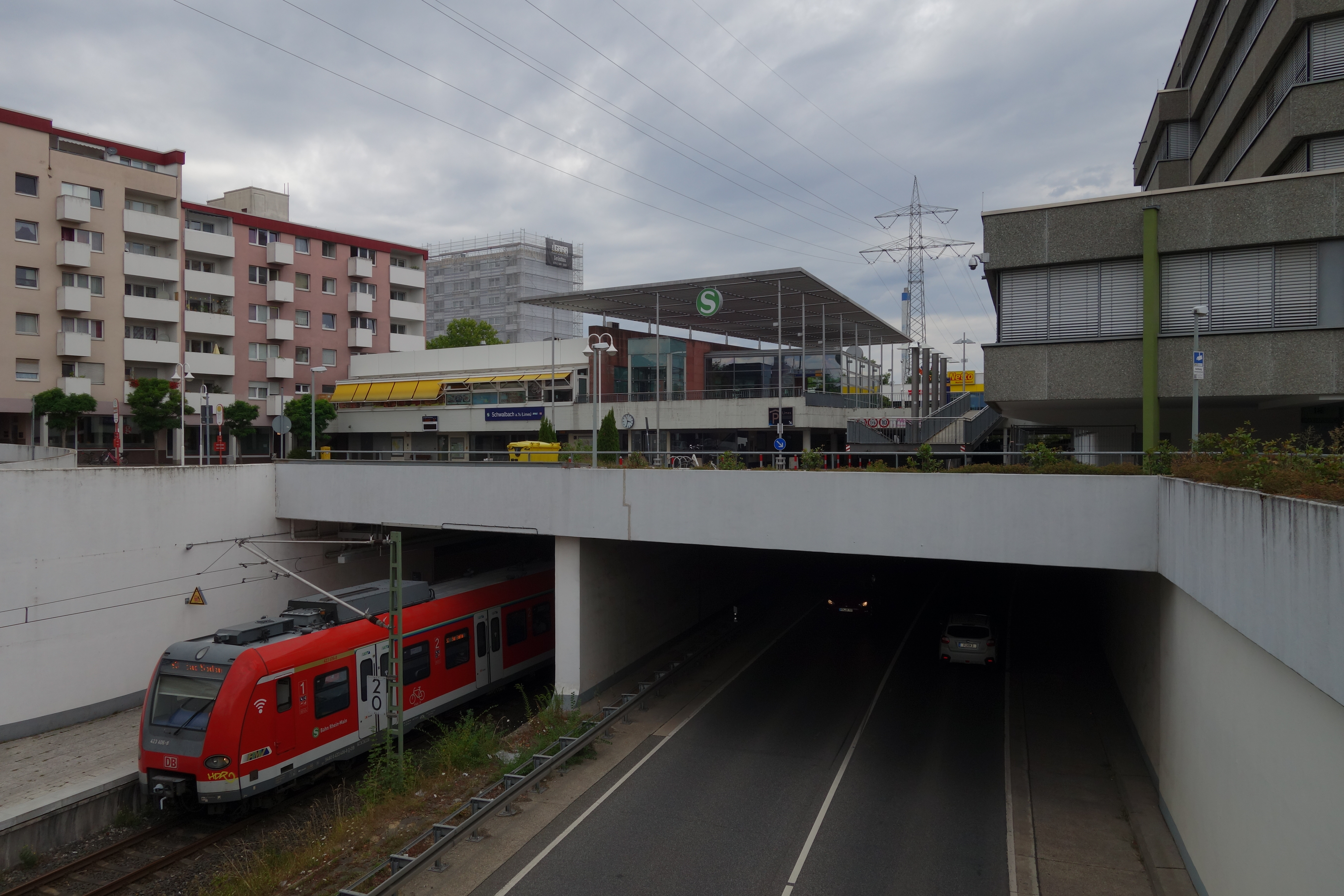
DBAG Class 423 at Schwalbach (Limes) station

The Rhine-Main S-Bahn passes through several tunnels, some of which include stations.

The most important of these is the Frankfurt City Tunnel, used by all lines except the S7. It has seven underground stations and is about 6.4 kilometres (4.0 mi) long. In the section between Hauptwache and Konstablerwache stations the tunnel is shared with Line C (U6 and U7) of the U-Bahn and at Konstablerwache there is cross-platform interchange betwee the two systems. After crossing under the Main, the tunnel splits with branches towards Frankfurt South station and Offenbach am Main. A junction also exists for the planned line north of the Main to Hanau.

The Offenbach City Tunnel is 3.7 kilometres (2.3 mi) long and has three underground stations, which are served by the lines S1, S2, S8 and S9. It opened in 1995.

There is a 2.2 kilometres (1.4 mi) long tunnel at the Frankfurt Airport, which passes under several roads and buildings and has a three-track subterranean regional train station below the airport terminal. Until the opening of the airport's long-distance railway station in 1999 it was also used by intercity trains. Since November 2016, a 4 km (2.5 mi) long relocation of the line between Frankfurt Stadium and the airport has passed through a new tunnel including a new Gateway Gardens station, opened in 2019 on the site of a former US military settlement.

In Mainz line S8 towards Wiesbaden runs through the two old railway tunnels between Mainz Römisches Theater and Mainz Hauptbahnhof. In the opposite direction it travels through the continuous New Mainz Tunnel.

The (single-track) station at Schwalbach (Limes),served by line S3, lies underground underneath the market square of the Limes town. The tunnel was built together with a parallel road tunnel and is about as long as the station itself.

Immediately north of Eppstein station line S2 used to pass through the 210 metres (690 ft) long Eppsteiner tunnel, built in 1877. From 2013 this has been replaced by a new tunnel because of otherwise problematic renovation work.

== The future ==
Plans for the system include a line to Hanau via Maintal, largely running north of the river Main. This would extend the S7 from Riedstadt-Goddelau, that currently terminates in the main hall of the Hauptbahnhof, with a service to and from Fechenheim (replacing the station at Mainkur) four times an hour of which half would extend to and from Hanau.

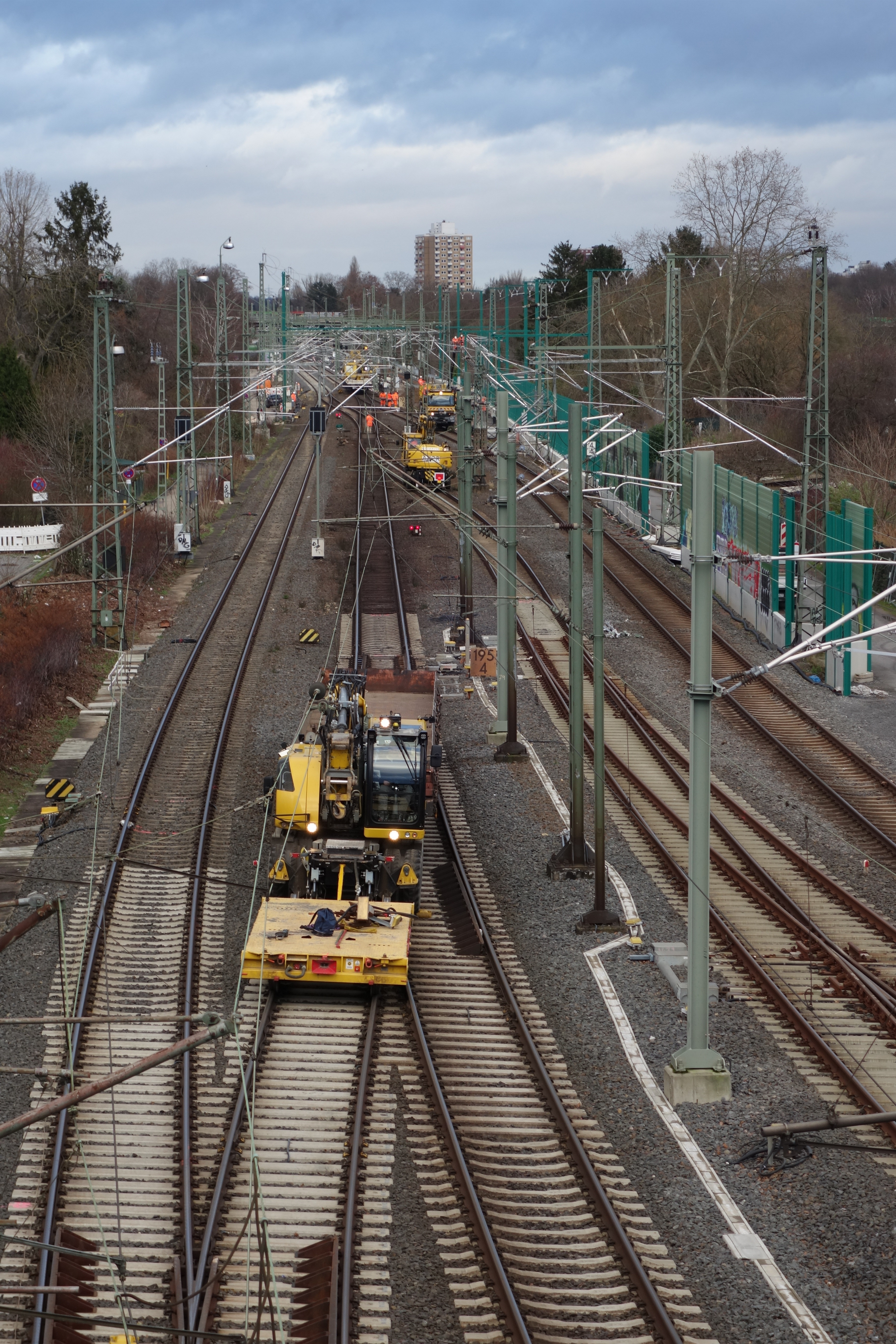
View from Breitenbachbrücke (Breitenbach bridge) in Frankfurt-Bockenheim upon Main–Weser Railway during quadruplication works (January 2024)

The S6 to Friedberg will get its own track to be independent of long-distance and regional traffic on the Main-Weser-Bahn. In the 1980s and 1990s, it was planned to expand the double track to a third track. Later, the plan was changed to build the S6 for their entire run until Friedberg own two tracks for a scheduled operation independent of long-distance, regional and freight traffic. After 24 years of planning and resolution of legal challenges, construction of the first phase between Frankfurt-West and Bad Vilbel started in December 2017. The S6 will receive a new station between Frankfurt-West and Eschersheim to serve Frankfurt-Ginnheim. The first phase went into service in late 2024.

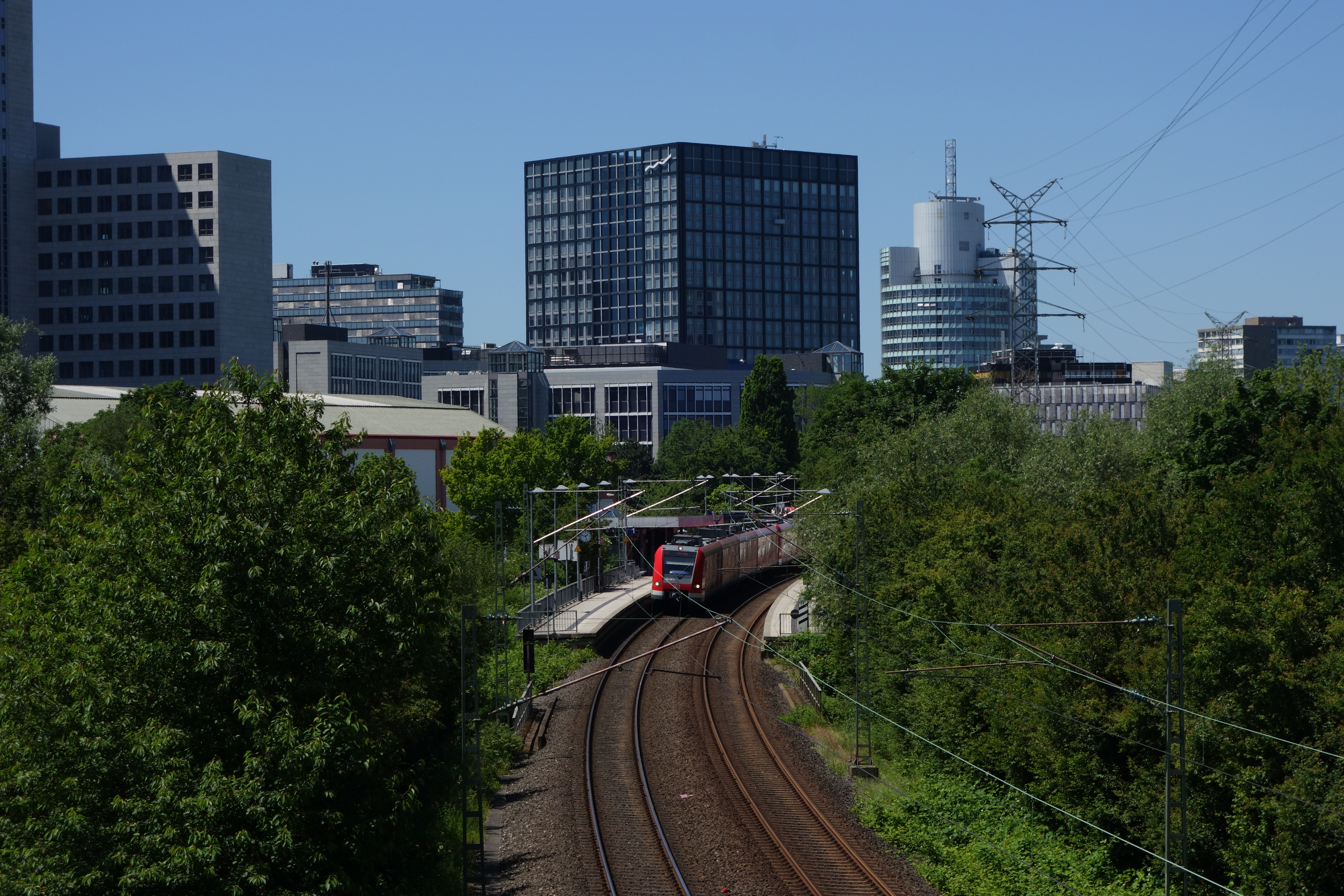
Here the future RTW shall be connected to the S-Bahn-system: Station Eschborn Süd with S4, heading for Langen. (Above the new building of Deutsche Börse called The Cube)

A further application of such two-system metropolitan railway vehicles is provided in the west of Frankfurt: Starting in Bad Homburg and Praunheim the so-called Regionaltangente West (RTW) will run along Eschborn Süd, Sulzbach (Taunus), Frankfurt-Sossenheim, Frankfurt-Höchst, Frankfurt Airport and Frankfurt Stadium to the Isenburg center in Neu-Isenburg or Dreieich-Buchschlag. The Regionaltangente West is to operate as a mixed operation of two-system metropolitan railway car on mostly existing light rail and railway / S-Bahn routes, which makes their realization - despite the great track length - quite reasonably priced. Its primary task is to strengthen the tangential traffic, to spare the passengers tiresome and time-consuming detours via the Frankfurt city center and to reduce the congestion of the Frankfurt City Tunnel. The realization began in 2023, the completion is scheduled for 2030.

Other projects under consideration include an extension of the S1 from Rödermark-Ober-Roden to Dieburg, an extension of the S7 from Riedstadt-Goddelau to Biblis, and a branch of the S7 to Groß-Gerau.

The Frankfurt district of Oberrad has seen a campaign to reactivate its rail station that was mothballed in the 1980s as an S-Bahn station.

A line planned in the 1990s was to have been led from Frankfurt over Rüsselsheim to Darmstadt. The train would have run from Darmstadt, passing through a curve yet to be built (Schindberg curve) before Bischofsheim and proceeding to Frankfurt. This would have given Darmstadt a long-desired direct connection to the Frankfurt airport. Furthermore, a fast connection between Darmstadt and Rüsselsheim would have been created, which would have saved significant time for many commuters. This project failed due to opposition from Bischofsheim's local council, which refused to build a curve in their district. They pointed out that a change of direction at Bischofsheim station was possible.

According to the Darmstadt-Dieburg local transport organization, the realization of this route is dependent on the expansion of the Main-Rhine-Bahn and a compression of the clock on this route. However, this should be done in the form of an extended to Frankfurt S-Bahn line S -Bahn RheinNeckar.

The S5 is planned to be extended via Friedrichsdorf to Usingen, requiring electrification of the Taunusbahn line. The green light for the project was given in May 2015, with a scheduled completion date of the end of 2019. A further extension to Grävenwiesbach (Hochtaunuskreis) and Brandoberndorf has been requested by local politicians in Hochtaunuskreis, but no action is expected until 2027 as RMV funds are already committed to the purchase of rolling stock.

== Similar suburban railways ==
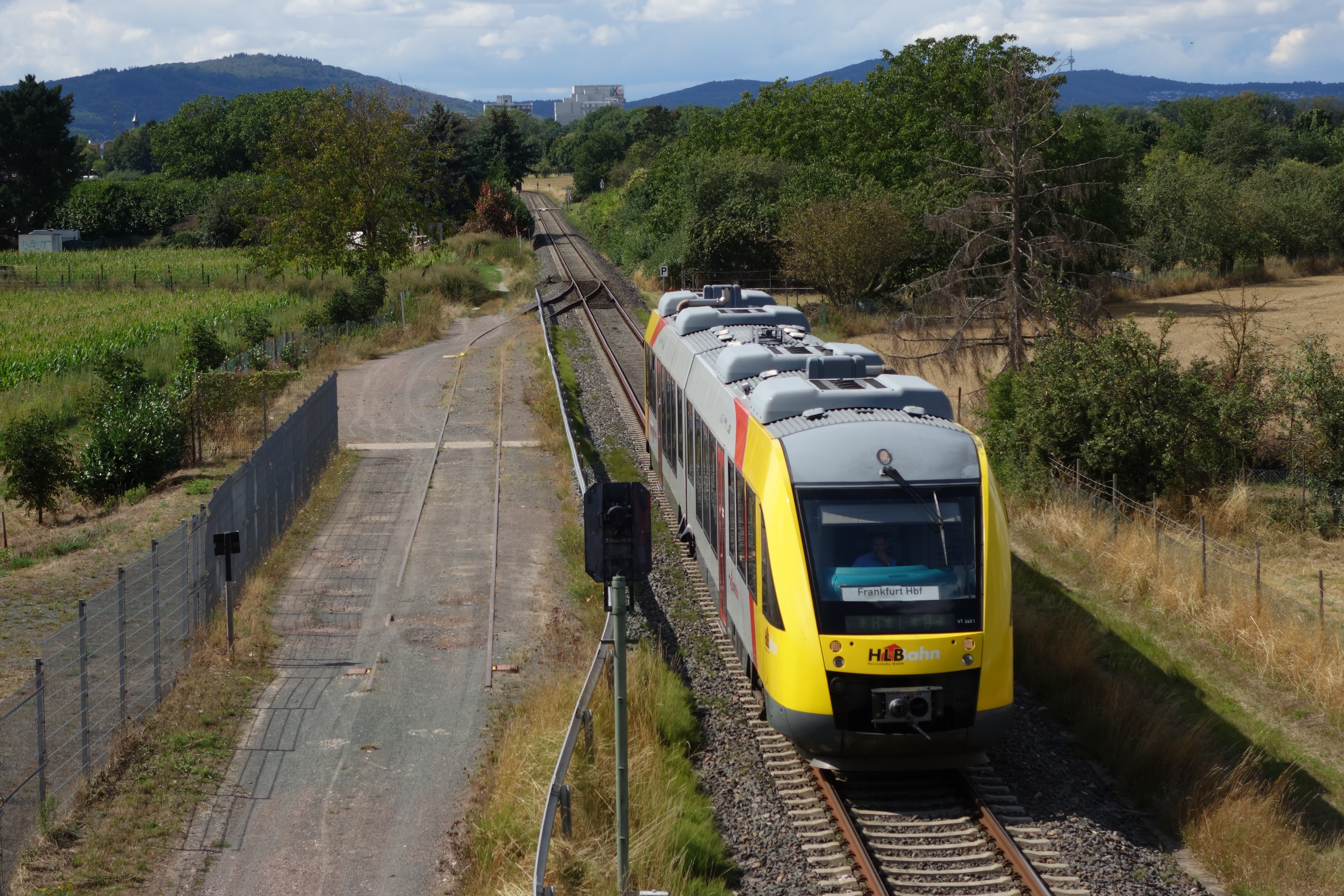
LINT 41 railcar of Königstein Railway near Unterliederbach

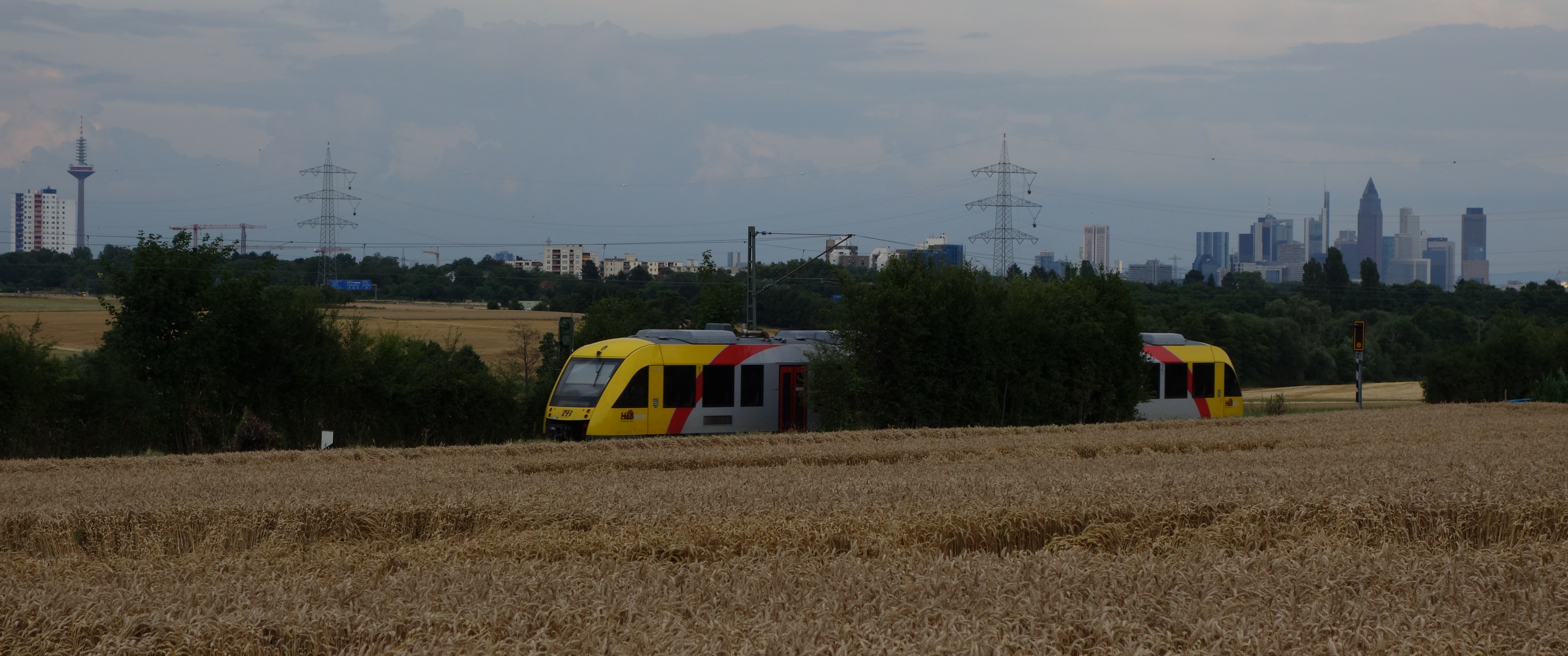
LINT 41 at Soden Railway passing the fields between Sulzbach and Sossenheim

On several regional routes without overhead contact line, S-Bahn-like traffic was already partially introduced at the time of the Frankfurter Verkehrsverbund, i.e. high density of traffic, continuous weekend traffic as well as trains bound through Frankfurt during the daytime and Frankfurt main station. The operators were and are the DB Regio and the Hessian State Railways (HLB), formerly the Frankfurt-Königsteiner Eisenbahn (FKE). The FVV led these lines with their own line letter (K, T and N) or as S-Bahn line (S9, S11). This affected the following routes (sorted by today's RMV line number):

- Königstein Railway or Königsteiner Bahn (12): Frankfurt central station – Frankfurt-Höchst – Königstein
  From the highest source line of the FKE. Here, starting in 1987, first as line K, with the new procurement of vehicles and adjustment of route and signaling technology dense traffic was introduced. Since 2003, all trains run continuously to Frankfurt Central Station.
- Soden Railway or Sodener Bahn (13): Frankfurt-Höchst – Bad Soden
  From 1979 to 1997, the Sodener Bahn was part of the S-Bahn line S3. For this purpose, the route was electrified. Due to insufficient capacity, the S-Bahn service was abandoned and the line was taken over by the FKE. It only operates as a connecting line.
- Taunus Railway or Taunusbahn (15): (Frankfurt central station –) Bad Homburg – Friedrichsdorf – Usingen – Grävenwiesbach (– Brandoberndorf)
  The Friedrichsdorf–Grävenwiesbach line, which was about to be shut down, was bought by the Verkehrsverband Hochtaunus, modernized and handed over to the FKE in 1992 for operation. Until the founding of the RMV, the line was called T. From 1999, the decommissioned part was reactivated to Brandoberndorf. The stations have S-Bahn-like standards such as high platforms (since 1992) or Zugzielanzeiger (since 2007). In rush hour, additional trains go to Frankfurt Hauptbahnhof.
- Bad Vilbel–Glauburg-Stockheim railway or Niddertalbahn (34): (Frankfurt central station –) Bad Vilbel – Nidderau – Glauburg-Stockheim
  Since the completion of the modernization work in May 2008, almost all work on weekdays and about one third of the trains to the main station on Saturdays, only a few were previously connected. in the FVV the route bore the line letter N.
- Dreieich Railway or Dreieichbahn (61): (Frankfurt central station –) Dreieich-Buchschlag – Rödermark-Ober-Roden (– Dieburg), referred to as S11 in the FVV network. Since summer 2016, the Dreieichbahn has been running to the main station every hour.

== Punctuality ==
The biggest problem experienced on the Rhine-Main S-Bahn is frequent unpunctuality, one reason for which is the shortage of capacity in the City Tunnel. The capacity of the tunnel was increased from 22 to 24 trains per hour (in each direction) in 2010 by optimising the Punktförmige Zugbeeinflussung signalling system, rather than upgrading the system to the more modern Linienzugbeeinflussung (LZB) system.

A further cause of delays is that many of the S-Bahn lines share track with freight trains, regional trains and inter-city trains. Longer distance passenger trains take priority over the S-Bahn, which frequently has to stand for up to 10 minutes to allow the other service to overtake. Mixed services are particularly found along the S6, S7, S8 and S9 routes. The operators recognise the need to separate S-Bahn services from other services along these routes. The first stage towards this was originally scheduled to start in 2007, doubling the number of tracks from two to four on the S6 line between Frankfurt West station and Bad Vilbel, but in October 2011 Deutsche Bahn stated that it expected work to start in 2014 and the extra tracks go into service in 2024.

== Rolling stock ==
165 S-Bahn trains are in operation. On December 31, 2012, the breakdown was as follows: 65 units of class 420 (of which 55 plantations and 10 reserves) and 100 units of class 423 (including 93 plantations and 7 reserves).

Until autumn 2014, the class 420 were replaced by modern vehicles of the DB 430 series. This is part of the contract that RMV signed with Deutsche Bahn in November 2011 following the tendering of transport services. Since the completion of the delivery, 100 vehicles of the class 423 and 91 vehicles of the class 430 are in use, the latter vehicles on the lines S1, S7, S8 and S9.

=== Class 420 ===
In the early years trains of the second and third series of electric locomotive class 420 in the color pure orange / Kieselgrau (contrary to original plans, the proposed paint carmine / kieselgrau was not used) were used in Frankfurt, although occasionally lent to 1990 due to lack of vehicles also from Munich blue white 420s were used, for example, the opening of the trunk line extension to Frankfurt South. The cars of the 2nd construction series were delivered completely to the S-Bahn Munich until the beginning of the 2000s. Due to the ever-increasing vehicle demand at that time were between 1980 and 2004 at irregular intervals all railcars of the third and fourth series and numerous cars of the fifth and sixth series from the S-Bahn Stuttgart delivered to Frankfurt.

In 2003 began the delivery of new class 423 railcars in Frankfurt, in parallel, in August 2003, the first ET 420 were retired. As of 2004, Frankfurt ET 420 no longer received any main examinations; this was only in 2007 with 420 271 started when it became clear that the delivery of the last railcar due to registration problems would have to be postponed indefinitely. All Frankfurt vehicles were also from 2007 to 2008 for three million euros, a modernization in the interior, which included light gray instead of striped partitions and new upholstery in the current design. At the same time, the already quite advanced phasing-out was severely curtailed and henceforth focused on the railcars of the third construction series in order to be able to take at least the oldest vehicles out of service. Two railcars received the test LED headlights, but these could not prevail in Frankfurt.

The rapid-transit railway Rhine Main had the first completely traffic-red vehicle park of the German course AG. This status was maintained until the end of 2003, when the S-Bahn Stuttgart handed over the orange-white and orange-pebble-gray units to Frankfurt. After just over a year, the S-Bahn were completely painted red by the z-position of the last orange-pebble-gray unit 420 376 early 2005. Until 2005, there was also the last pebble gray orange 420 (apart from 420 001) in Frankfurt, but this train was scrapped in the spring of 2005 in Trier-Ehrang.

In 2009, when the use of the class 420 at the S-Bahn Rhein-Ruhr was completed, the Essen depot delivered several ET 420 of the fifth and sixth series to Frankfurt. Although the Frankfurt plant made great efforts to align the railcars to the Frankfurt units (for example, most railcars were still redesigned in 2007), they were in such poor condition by the end of years of poor maintenance in North Rhine-Westphalia that From then on, they were usually taken out of service directly at the end of the investigation period.

In parallel, four Stuttgart trains of the seventh series were relocated to Frankfurt in July 2009. After the main inspection, three of them were initially deployed from mid-June, primarily on the S7 and the airport short-commuter (S8 / S9), later normal in mixed operation with older units on all ET 420 rides. In the spring of 2014, another train of the seventh series and four trains of the eighth series were relocated from Stuttgart to Frankfurt in order to absorb a shortage of vehicles resulting from deadlines in older 420s. This was also the only period in which the eighth series in Frankfurt was in use.

After an early deployment was already foreseeable at that time, no great efforts were made to adapt the car to the Frankfurt railcar - some of them were in the interior until the withdrawal with Stuttgarter advertising stickers.

The 65 remaining trains of the 420 series were still in operation until November 2014. Since the conversion of the S7 and some of the S1 (which had previously been performed by 420s since the autumn of 2013) to the new 430 series in May 2014 made numerous 420s redundant, the phasing out progressed sharply. Another reason for this was the expiry of the examination period of many vehicles, while at the same time main examinations were no longer worthwhile due to the manageable remaining service life.

In the last months of operation, trains of the 420 series were still in service on the S8 and S9 lines. In exceptional cases or in case of vehicle shortage a use of the series 420 in the entire network was possible, so that in very rare cases even to use z. B. came on the lines S5 and S6, which were converted in 2005 on the trains of the series 423.

The use of the 420 series in the network of the S-Bahn Rhein-Main ended in the night of November 3, 2014. A sale and other options - depending on the condition of the remaining units - according to the media checked, but has been since the end of the already most of the remaining railcars have been scrapped.

An official museum train was not kept by the S-Bahn Rhein-Main. However, a private association of railway friends in Gießen was able to take over the unit 420 298 on a permanent loan and undertake regular special services in the Frankfurt area with this railcar, which they also work up (initially in their last operational condition).

=== Class 423 ===
While Stuttgart and Cologne were already supplied in 1999 with the successor series 423 and Munich between 2000 and 2004, the entire vehicle fleet exchanged, Frankfurt began in 2003 with the partial renewal, after 2002 for testing purposes, a few railcars of the S-Bahn Munich in the S-Bahn Rhine-Main were used.

Since October 2010, 100 series 423 multiple units have been running in Frankfurt am Main (third series: 301–305, 325–334, fourth / fifth series: 372–456). Since June 2006, the lines S1 (with the exception of single roundabouts), S4, S5 and S6 are complete with 423. Since the timetable change on December 9, 2006, the S2 line is also driving with the new railcars. The short commuter trains S8 and S9 from the main station to Frankfurt Airport are partially driven by 423. The line S3 is served since March 28, 2010 exclusively with 423. Initially, the new units were primarily used, which were only approved in early 2010.

In the second half of 2014, the trains of the 423 series were also on weekdays in regular operation on the entire route of the S8 / S9 on the way to accelerate the shutdown of the 420 series. Since the end of 2014, the new 430 series has been in use here.

A total of 100 units were ordered, which should be delivered by mid-2007. However, the last tranche of 13 units arrived in Frankfurt in 2010. The last class 423 railcar (423 456) was delivered at the end of October 2010. Short-term rental vehicles were also used by S-Bahn Stuttgart. The reason for the delay was the photocell problem.

Between 2013 and 2016, all of the Frankfurt 423 series railcars were modernized to take them to the level of the successor 430 series, after six years in service. This includes:

- the replacement of all LCD displays with larger LED displays
- a modernization of the interior with new seat cushion design
- the retrofitting of video surveillance cameras
- An adaptation of the passenger information through the installation of progress monitors and alignment of the announcement system to that of the ET430 (this step has not been completed to date [as of: August 2016])
- the refurbishment of the car bodies with new paint
- the retrofitting of microphone units for wheelchair users
- as well as the installation of new door closing signals.

The last point brought the modernized railcar and the RMV as the initiator of the modernization in the early days of severe criticism, as many passengers and train employees the new door signals (which also include a signal when the doors are open) as annoying, even annoying. The RMV referred to existing EU directives, which oblige the installation of such signals, admitted, however, that there had been a manufacturer-design error in the installation of the new signals, which could have increased the intensity of the beep unintentionally.

=== Class 430 ===
The DB class 430 completely replaced the class 420 in 2014. In normal operation, only the class 423 and 430 are now in service. 91 430 series kits were supplied, which is 29 units more than needed for a mere replacement. The fleet was increased from 162 vehicles to 191 traction units. On 5 May 2014 took place on the S1 (Wiesbaden - Rödermark-Ober-Roden) and the amplifier courses of the S8 between Frankfurt Hbf and Kelsterbach the first passenger service of the class 430 in the Rhine-Main area. Almost three weeks later, on May 23, 2014, the S7 (Frankfurt Hbf - Riedstadt-Goddelau) was completely converted to the 430 series. At the end of October, the operations began on the "long" S8 and S9, since November 3, 2014, these lines have been completely reorganized.

The introduction of the new railcars was, as with the S-Bahn Stuttgart, accompanied by several problems:

- Following the conversion of the S7 in May 2014, a design error in the wheelchair ramp caused an accident in which a ramp slipped out of the train due to the lack of barbs during use, severely injuring a wheelchair user. Further use of the ramps was subsequently banned until further notice. However, as many platforms in the network are not high enough to disembark a wheelchair user without a ramp and handlers are not allowed to pick them up by hand, the DB Station & Service transport line had to be alerted to a mobile Ramp to bring the scene, which sometimes took several hours.
- In contrast to the 423 series, where only the ramp request buttons are directly behind the driver's cab used, all the request buttons were always active in the 430 series and were often groundless, resulting in each of the multi-purpose areas of the engine being challenged by the driver Train (depending on train length up to six pieces) on wheelchair users with exit request had to control, so that the trains quickly large delays collected and prematurely reversed, failed completely or were replaced on the way by older vehicles. This problem was particularly frequent after the S1 was converted to the new railcars, which drastically reduced line reliability in the early weeks. The fact that the wheelchair pushbuttons were now also attached to all doors and could easily be actuated accidentally further compounded the problem. After no other solutions led to success, starting in September 2014, all wheelchair push-buttons located in the door frame were removed.
- In the first winter of operations, there were other problems: As a result of inadequate heating of driver's cabs and particularly loud noise-related annoyance reports in enormous frequency in January 2015 so many train drivers were sick leave that the line S4 had to be set for several days.

== Further S-Bahn ==
With the official start of operation of the S-Bahn Rhein-Main in 1978, the lines on which still "normal" trains reversed were marked in the traffic plan of the FVV as S-Bahn, so that there the lines S7, S9 and S11 to S14 were recorded. These trains also run at regular intervals as far as the intercommunication with the long-distance traffic. Excluded was only the route to Dietzenbach, which was designated as R10 and was shut down a few years later; this is reactivated today as part of the S2. With the transition to RMV, the marking of these routes as S-Bahn was omitted, which had become largely obsolete because of the network extensions. From the source network until today only the north-Maine route from Frankfurt to Hanau was not integrated into the rapid-transit railway enterprise (at that time S7, today RMV-Linie 55).

== See also ==
- Rail transport in Germany
