= S6 (Rhine-Main S-Bahn) =

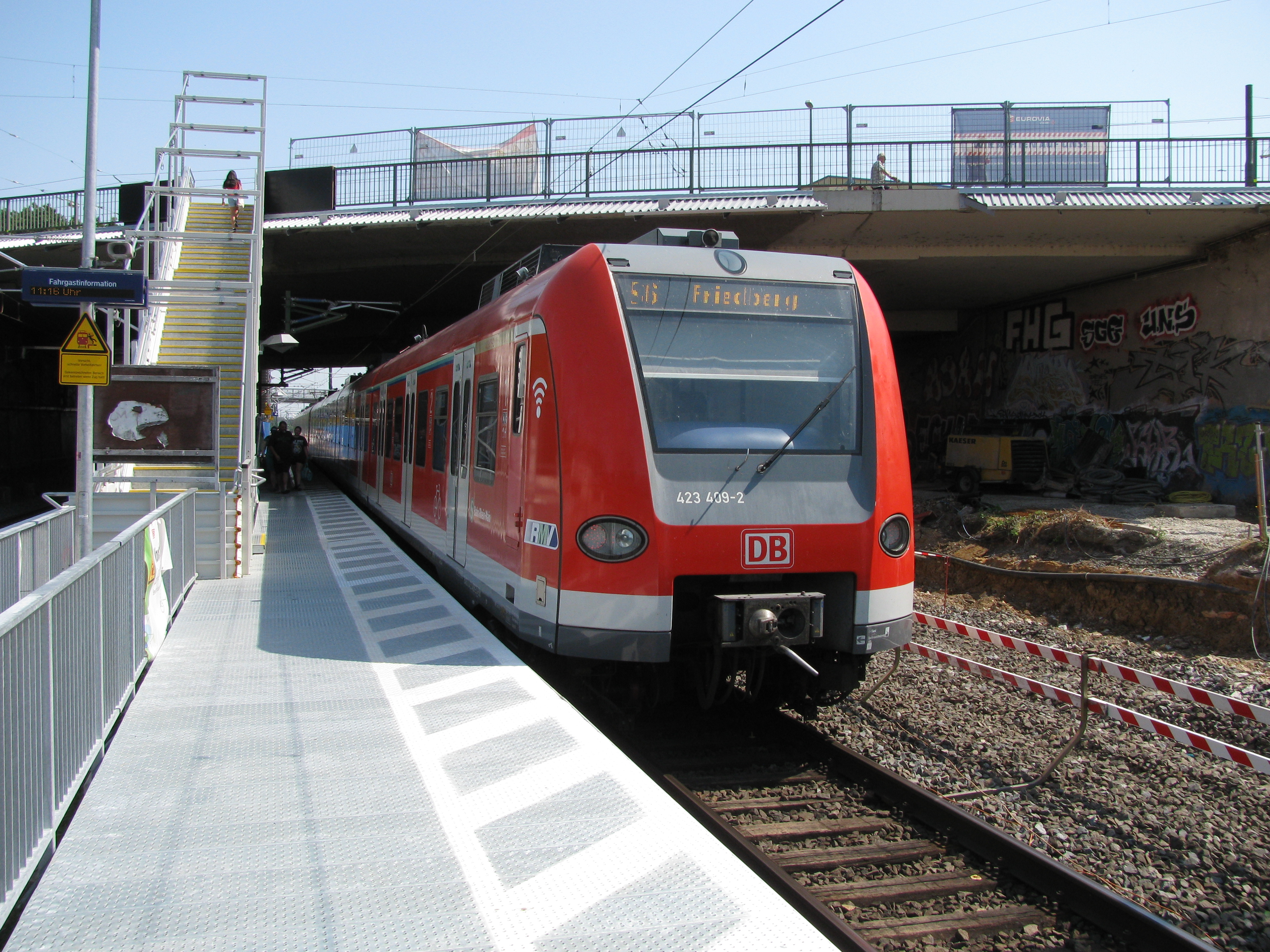
- S6 to Friedberg at Frankfurt-Eschersheim station

Overview
- Status: Operational
- Owner: Rhein-Main-Verkehrsverbund
- Line number: 6
- Locale: Frankfurt Rhine-Main
- Termini: Friedberg; Darmstadt Hauptbahnhof
- Stations: 33

Service
- Type: Rapid transit, Commuter rail
- System: S-Bahn Rhein-Main
- Services: Main-Weser Railway, Citytunnel Frankfurt, Main-Neckar Railway
- Route number: 645.6
- Operator(s): DB Regio
- Depot(s): Frankfurt Hbf
- Rolling stock: DBAG Class 423

History
- Opened: 28 May 1978

Technical
- Track gauge: 1,435 mm (4 ft 8 1/2 in) standard gauge
- Electrification: Overhead line

The S6 service of the S-Bahn Rhein-Main system bearing the KBS (German scheduled railway route) number 645.6

== Routes ==
=== City tunnel ===
The city tunnel is an underground, pure S-Bahn route used by almost all services (except for the S7 service which terminates at the central station).

== History ==
| Year | Stations | Route |
|---|---|---|
| 1974 (R6) | 13 | Friedberg – Frankfurt Hbf |
| 1978 | 16 (+3) | Friedberg – Hauptwache |
| 1983 | 17 (+1) | Friedberg – Konstablerwache |
| 1990 | 21 (+4) | Friedberg – Stresemannallee |
| 1997 | 20 (-1) | Friedberg – Frankfurt Süd |
| 1999 | 21 (+1) | Friedberg – Frankfurt Süd |
| 2024 | 33 (+12) | Friedberg – Darmstadt Hbf |

The S6 was one of the first six services of the Rhine-Main S-Bahn system. In a prior test operation it ran between Friedberg and Frankfurt Central Station. The service was then called R6 where the letter "R" stands for regional. After the opening of the Frankfurt Citytunnel the service was renamed to S6 and extended to the new Hauptwache underground station. Further extensions of the tunnel followed in 1983 (Konstablerwache) and 1990 (Ostendstraße and Lokalbahnhof) so that Stresemannallee became the service's eastern terminal.

== Operation ==
1. Friedberg – Langen
2. Groß Karben – Darmstadt Hbf
3. Bad Vilbel – Darmstadt Hbf
4. Frankfurt Hbf – Darmstadt Hbf
5. Friedberg – Frankfurt Süd
6. Friedberg – Darmstadt Hbf

| S6 (Rhine-Main S-Bahn) | | | | | | Journey time | | Station | Transfer | S-Bahn service since |
| 1 | 2 | 3 | 4 | 5 | 6 | | | | | |
=== Wetteraukreis ===
| | | | | | | 0 | | Friedberg (Hess) | | 1978 |
| | | | | | | 4 | +4 | Friedberg-Bruchenbrücken | | 1978 |
| | | | | | | 6 | +2 | Wöllstadt-Nieder-Wöllstadt | | 1978 |
| | | | | | | 9 | +3 | Karben-Okarben | | 1978 |
| | | | | | | 12 | +3 | Karben-Groß-Karben | | 1978 |
| | | | | | | 15 | +3 | Bad Vilbel-Dortelweil | | 1978 |
| | | | | | | 20 | +5 | Bad Vilbel | | 1978 |
| | | | | | | 22 | +2 | Bad Vilbel-Süd | | 1978 |
=== Frankfurt am Main ===
| | | | | | | 25 | +3 | Frankfurt-Berkersheim | | 1978 |
| | | | | | | 27 | +2 | Frankfurt-Frankfurter Berg | | 1978 |
| | | | | | | 29 | +2 | Frankfurt-Eschersheim | U1 U2 U3 U8 | 1978 |
| | | | | | | 32 | +3 | Frankfurt-Ginnheim | U1 U9 | 2024 |
| | | | | | | 35 | +2 | Frankfurt West | S3 (Rhine-Main S-Bahn) S4 (Rhine-Main S-Bahn) S5 (Rhine-Main S-Bahn) | 1978 |
| | | | | | | 37 | +2 | Frankfurt Messe | S3 (Rhine-Main S-Bahn) S4 (Rhine-Main S-Bahn) S5 (Rhine-Main S-Bahn) | 1999 |
| | | | | | | 38 | +1 | Frankfurt Galluswarte | S3 (Rhine-Main S-Bahn) S4 (Rhine-Main S-Bahn) S5 (Rhine-Main S-Bahn) | 1978 |
| | | | | | | 42 | +2 | Frankfurt Hbf (tief) | U4 U5 | 1978 |
| | | | | | | 44 | +2 | Taunusanlage | S1 (Rhine-Main S-Bahn) S2 (Rhine-Main S-Bahn) S3 (Rhine-Main S-Bahn) S4 (Rhine-Main S-Bahn) S5 (Rhine-Main S-Bahn) S8 (Rhine-Main S-Bahn) S9 (Rhine-Main S-Bahn) | 1978 |
| | | | | | | 45 | +1 | Hauptwache | U1 U2 U3 U6 U7 U8 | 1978 |
| | | | | | | 47 | +2 | Konstablerwache | U4 U5 U6 U7 | 1983 |
| | | | | | | 49 | +2 | Ostendstraße | S1 (Rhine-Main S-Bahn) S2 (Rhine-Main S-Bahn) S3 (Rhine-Main S-Bahn) S4 (Rhine-Main S-Bahn) S5 (Rhine-Main S-Bahn) S8 (Rhine-Main S-Bahn) S9 (Rhine-Main S-Bahn) | 1990 |
| | | | | | | 51 | +2 | Frankfurt Lokalbahnhof | S3 (Rhine-Main S-Bahn) S4 (Rhine-Main S-Bahn) S5 (Rhine-Main S-Bahn) | 1990 |
| | | | | | | 52 | +1 | Frankfurt South Station | U1 U2 U3 U8 | 1990 |
| | | | | | | 54 | +2 | Frankfurt Stresemannallee | | 1990 |
| | | | | | | 56 | +2 | Frankfurt Louisa | | 1997 |
=== Kreis Offenbach ===
| | | | | | | 59 | +3 | Neu-Isenburg | | 1997 |
| | | | | | | 62 | +3 | Dreieich-Buchschlag | | 1997 |
| | | | | | | 64 | +2 | Langen Flugsicherung | | 2002 |
| | | | | | | 66 | +2 | Langen | | 1997 |
| | | | | | | 69 | +3 | Egelsbach | | 1997 |
=== Kreis Darmstadt-Dieburg ===
| | | | | | | 71 | +2 | Erzhausen | | 1997 |
=== Darmstadt ===
| | | | | | | 73 | +2 | Darmstadt-Wixhausen | | 1997 |
| | | | | | | 76 | +3 | Darmstadt-Arheilgen | | 1997 |
| | | | | | | 80 | +4 | Darmstadt Hbf | | 1997 |
