= Frankfurt-Frankfurter Berg station =

Railway station in Frankfurt, Germany

Frankfurt Frankfurter Berg
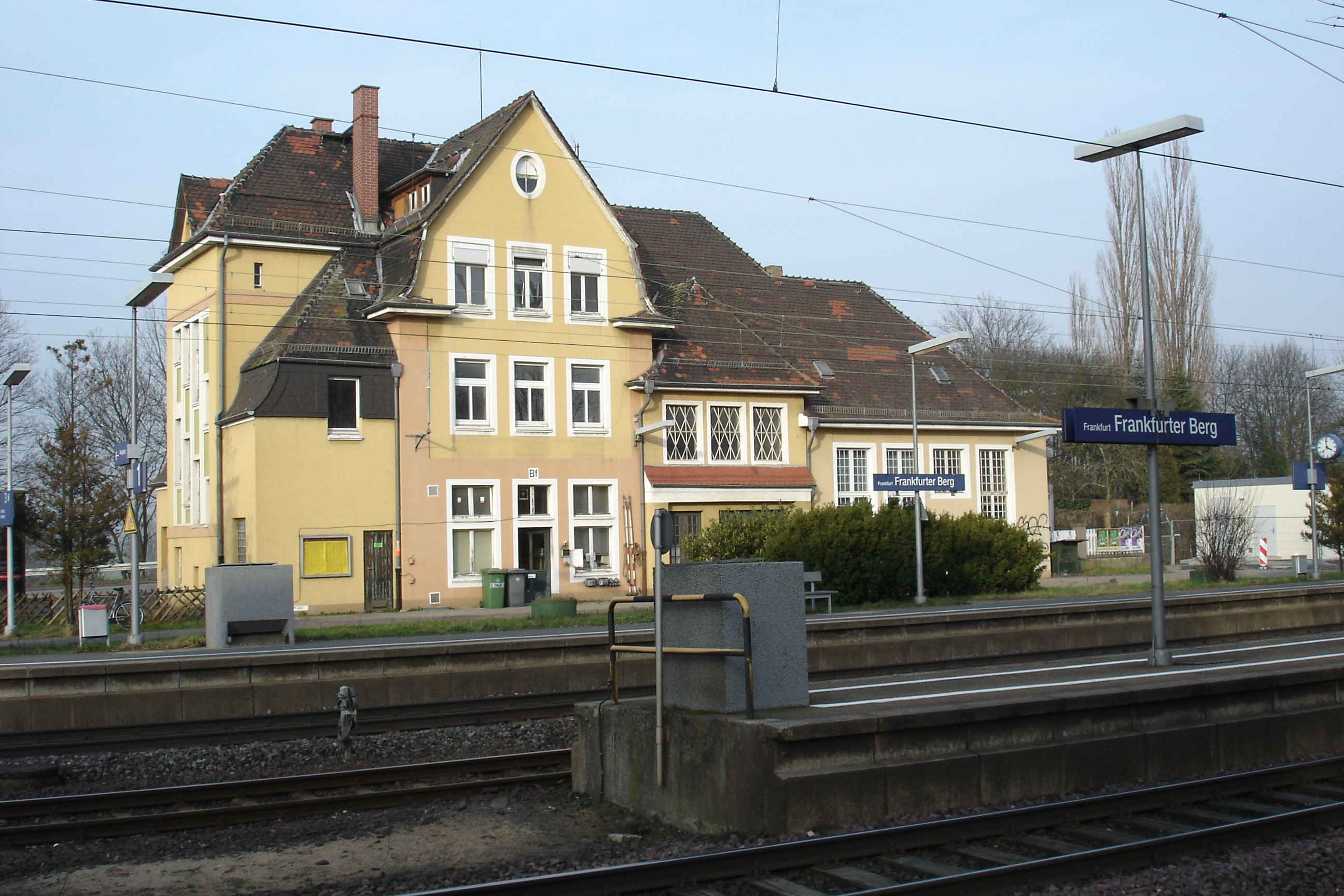

General information
- Location: Homburger Landstr. 465; Frankfurt, Hesse; Germany
- Coordinates: 50°10′12″N 8°40′38″E
- Lines: Main–Weser Railway (189.4 km) (KBS 645.6
- Platforms: 3

Other information
- Station code: 1869
- DS100 code: FFBS
- IBNR: 8002044
- Category: 4
- Fare zone: : 5006
- Website: www.bahnhof.de

History
- Opened: 1850
- Former names: Bonames

Services
Preceding station	Rhine-Main S-Bahn	Following station
Frankfurt-Berkersheim towards Friedberg (Hess)	S6 (Rhine-Main S-Bahn)	Frankfurt-Eschersheim towards Darmstadt Hbf
Location

Frankfurt-Frankfurter Berg station (German: Bahnhof Frankfurt-Frankfurter Berg) is a railway station located in the Frankfurter Berg district of Frankfurt, Germany. The station is classified by Deutsche Bahn as a category 5 station and part of the Main–Weser Railway. The station was called Bonames until 1996.

== History ==
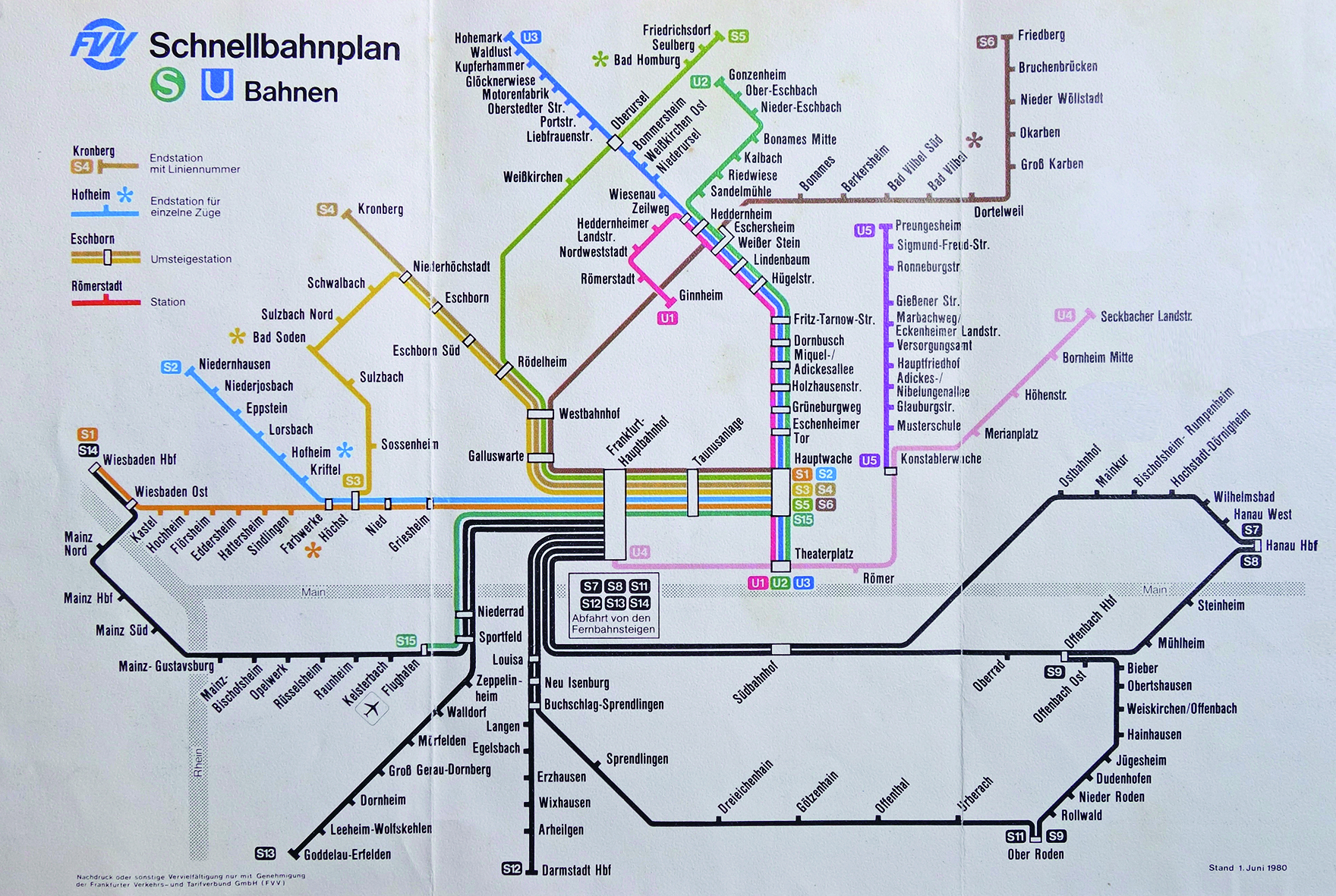
The station under the name Bonames on a route map of 1980 (top right)

The station was built near the former independent village of Bonames, which is 1,500 metres away. Bonames became part of Frankfurt in 1910. The station building was built between 1911 and 1914 and is oriented towards the northwest and the village. It is a neo-baroque building and is listed as a monument under the Hessian Heritage Act. In 1996 parts of Bonames, Eschersheim and Berkersheim were merged into a new city district (Frankfurter Berg) and the station was renamed.

The station also formerly handled freight. It was also connected by a siding to a leather dye works.

== Services ==
The station is served by line S6 of the Rhine-Main S-Bahn. Between the two tracks of the main line there is a passing track. In addition to the platform next to the entrance building, there is a central platform, which can only be reached by a pedestrian underpass from the main platform. To the south the newly created district of Frankfurter Berg is accessible to pedestrians by a second pedestrian underpass, but it cannot be directly accessed from the platform. This has only limited accessibility for the disabled and will be eliminated in the course of the upgrading of the Main-Weser Railway from two to four tracks between the stations of Frankfurt West and Bad Vilbel.

== Planning ==
There are plans to extend line U5 of the Frankfurt U-Bahn along Homburger Landstraße to the station, but this would first require the conversion of the existing tram track section to operations with high platforms.
