= Batschkapp =

Rock and pop concert venue in Frankfurt am Main

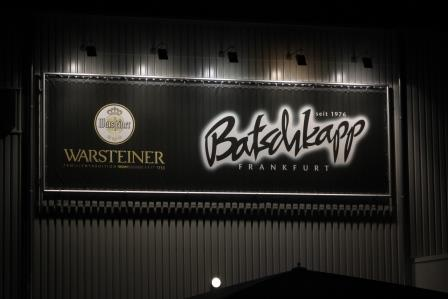
- Batschkapp logo

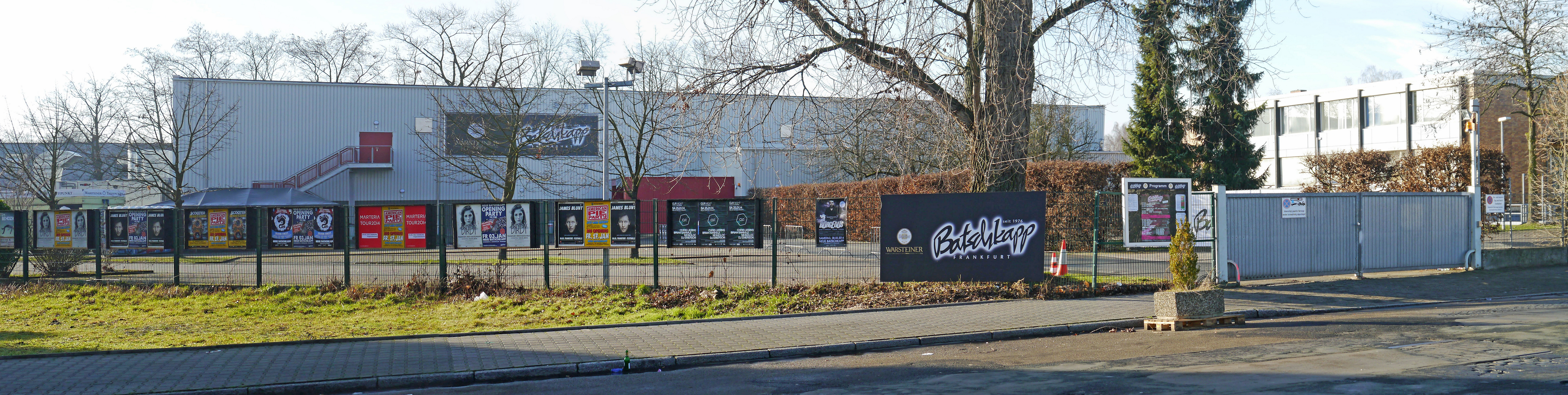
- Batschkapp after the move to Seckbach (2014)
- Interactive map of Batschkapp
- Location: Seckbach, Frankfurt
- Coordinates: 50°08′07″N 8°44′21″E
- Capacity: 1,500
- Public transit: Gwinnerstraße

Construction
- Opened: 11 December 1976
- Reopened: 2013 (moved)

Website
- batschkapp.de

Batschkapp (Hessian dialect for 'flat cap') is a rock and pop concert venue in Frankfurt am Main. It is located in the warehouse district of the neighborhood of Seckbach, on Gwinnerstraße.

== History ==
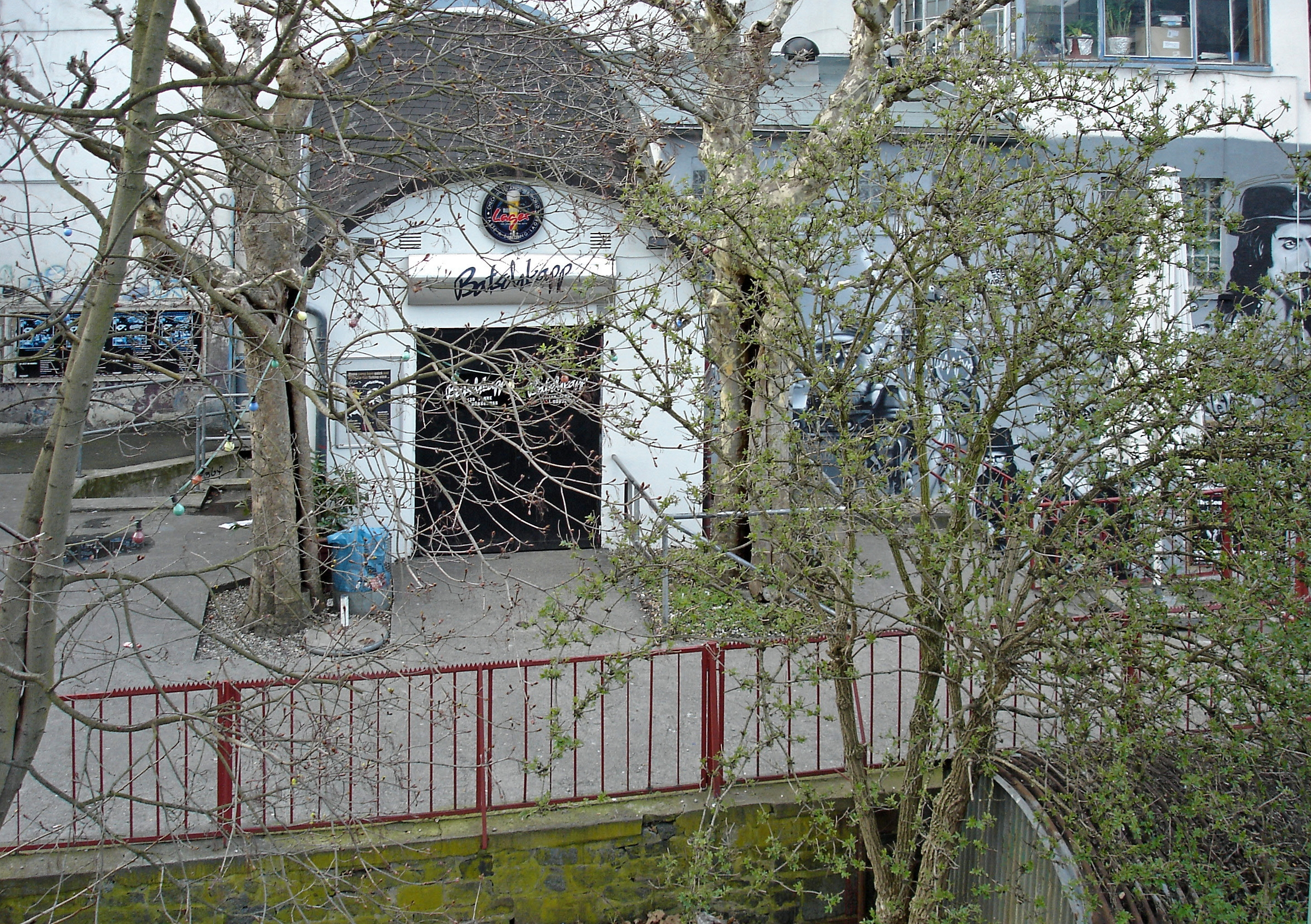
Entrance of Batchkapp in the original building

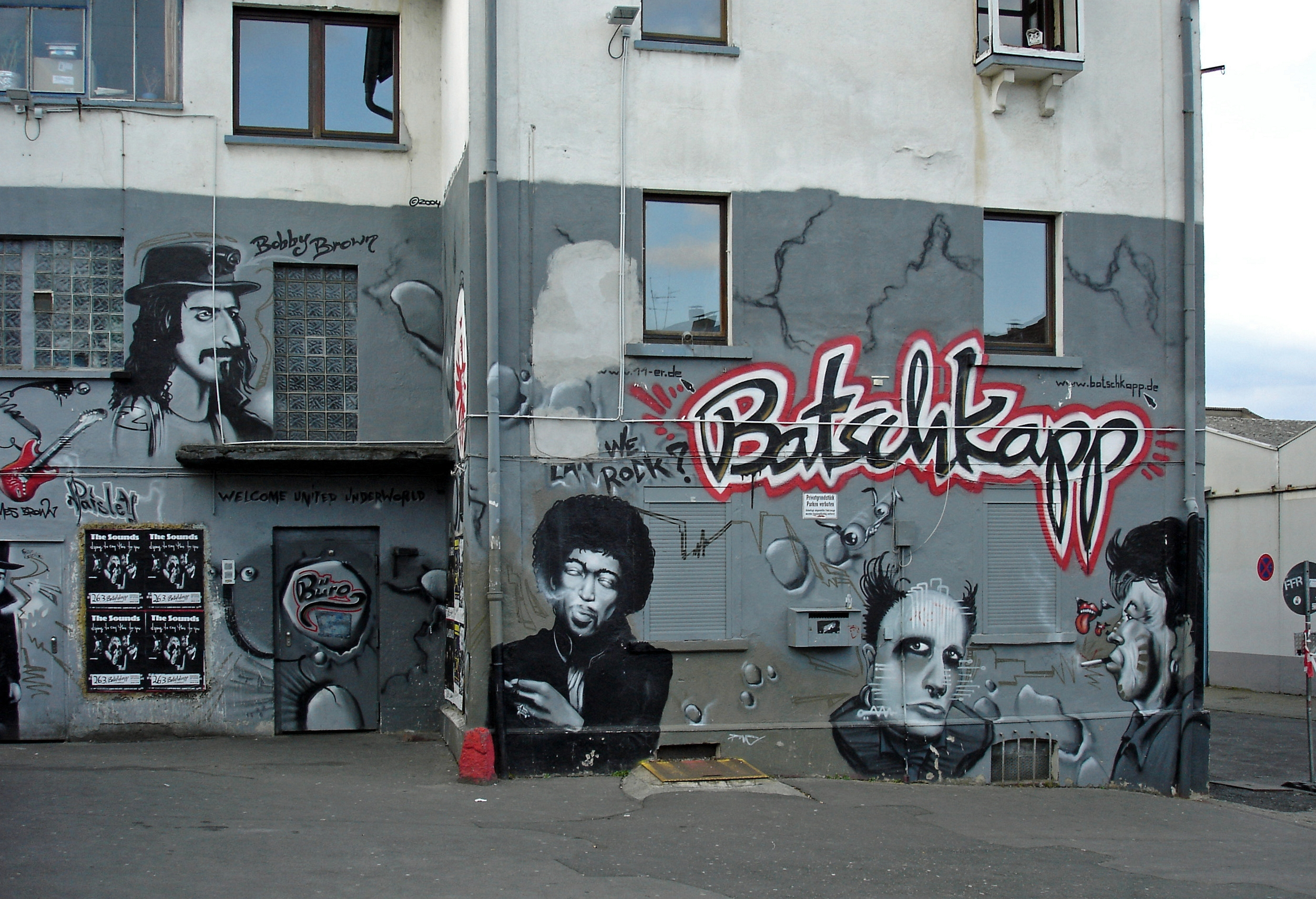
The Batschkapp logo as graffito on the outside wall of the original building

Batschkapp was founded in 1976 to establish an autonomous and left-wing counter culture, and opened on 11 December 1976. It began as a cultural centre associated with the neighbourhood centre Arbeiterselbsthilfe which was located in the inn "Zum Elfmeter", in Maybachstraße next to Frankfurt Eschersheim station. This had been called "Wirtschaft zum Bahnhof" in 1910, and used as a dormitory for approximately 100 forced labourers between 1940 and 1945. It was then used as an operetta theatre and a cinema from 1949 to 1965. Joschka Fischer was a regular visitor in the early days.

At the beginning of the 1980s, Batschkapp was in financial difficulties caused by extensions of fire safety and other standards and had tax debts of DM 30,000. A benefit concert in 1982 with Ideal and BAP among the bands generated enough profit to keep the venue in business.

To celebrate its 30-year anniversary, a double CD "Batschkapp 76-06 – 30 Jahre Hörgenuss" was issued.

Batschkapp moved on 10 December 2013. The original venue was demolished in February 2016, after archaeological excavations were made because the site was within the grounds of Rühl'sche Hof, to enable the building of flats and a supermarket. The new venue in Gwinnerstraße in Seckbach is a former plastics factory and has a capacity of 1500 whereas the old venue at the bridge Maybachbrücke in Eschersheim had a capacity of 350, which was sometimes exceeded. To celebrate its 40-year anniversary, a booklet "40 Jahre Batschkapp – Eine Legende" was published.

== Media ==
- The video clip Hier kommt die Schwester of the singer Sabrina Setlur, who was still using her stage name Schwester S. at the time, was filmed in front of and in Batschkapp in 1995.
- In 2007, Anja Ehrhardt filmed a 45-minute documentary Ein Musikclub wird erwachsen with appearances of Joschka Fischer, Wolfgang Niedecken and Farin Urlaub about Batschkapp for the television of Hessischer Rundfunk. The film includes scenes from the Frankfurt Techno-Party Tunnel Rave which Batschkapp held at the end of August 1994.
- The management has also been running a smaller club called Nachtleben in Konstablerwache since February 1993.

== Awards ==
Batschkapp won the Live Entertainment Award for the best club of the year at the Musikmesse Frankfurt in March 2012.
