= Frankfurt-Louisa station =

Railway station in Frankfurt, Germany

Frankfurt Louisa
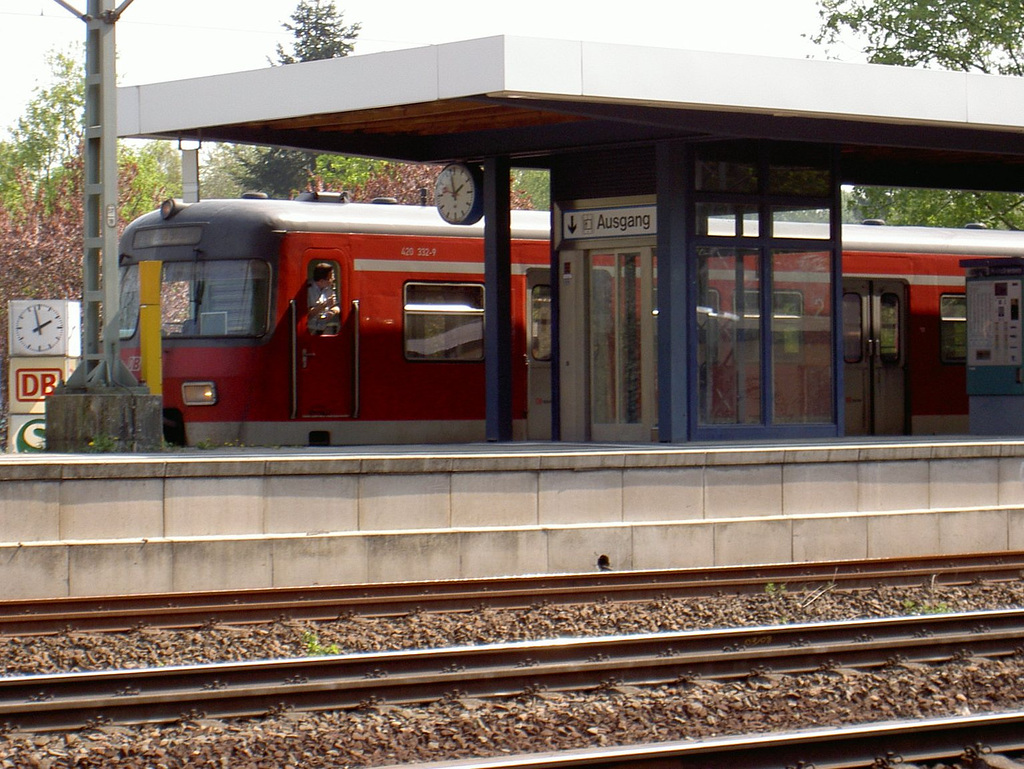
- Line S3 service at Louisa station

General information
- Location: Schwarzsteinkautweg 1, Frankfurt-Louisa, Frankfurt am Main, Hesse; Germany
- Coordinates: 50°04′59″N 8°40′13″E
- Line: Main-Neckar railway
- Platforms: 2

Construction
- Accessible: Yes

Other information
- Station code: 1873
- DS100 code: FLS
- IBNR: 8002047
- Category: 4
- Fare zone: : 5081
- Website: www.bahnhof.de

History
- Opened: 1877

Services
Preceding station	Rhine-Main S-Bahn	Following station
Stresemannallee towards Friedberg (Hess)	S6 (Rhine-Main S-Bahn)	Neu Isenburg towards Darmstadt Hbf
Location
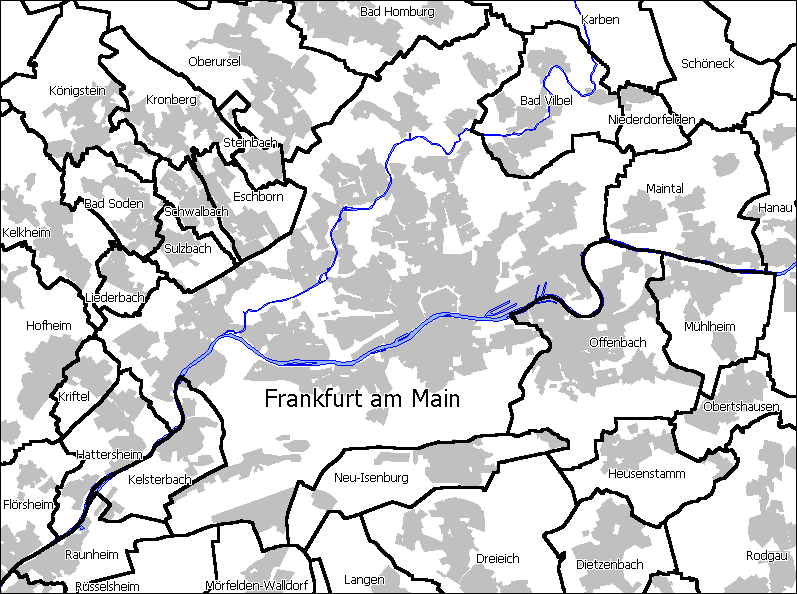
- Location within Frankfurt am Main Location within Hesse Location within Germany Location within Europe

Frankfurt-Louisa station is a station served by the Rhine-Main S-Bahn in the city of Frankfurt, Germany. It is on the Main-Neckar Railway between Frankfurt and Heidelberg and is classified by Deutsche Bahn as a category 4 station.

== History ==
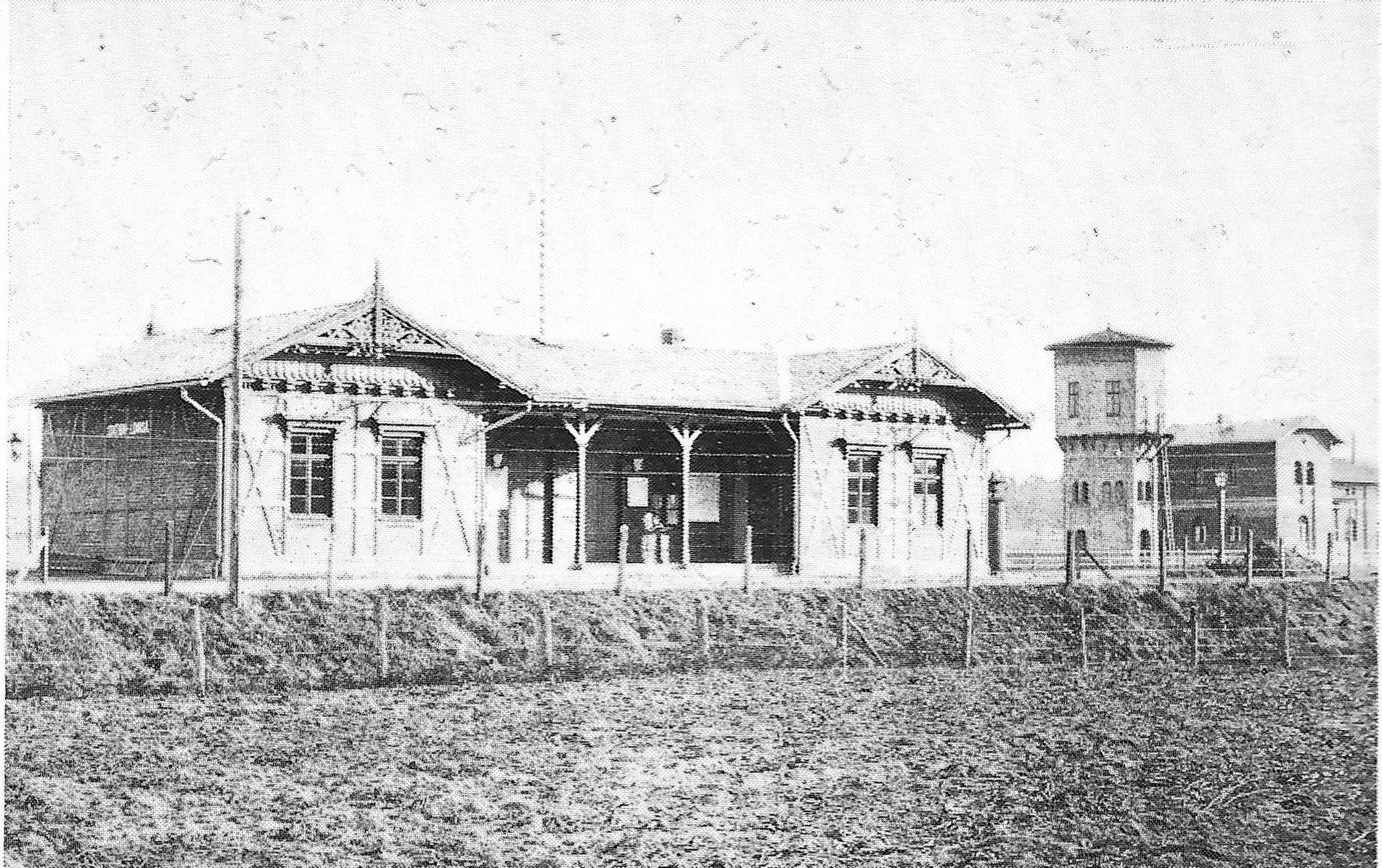
Frankfurt-Louisa station building at its opening in 1877

The station was opened soon after the connection of the Frankfurt–Offenbach railway to the Main-Neckar Railway running towards the Main-Weser station in Frankfurt. The junction entered into operation on 1 April 1876. At the same time a connecting curve was opened from the south towards Sachsenhausen and Offenbach. A year later, on 15 May 1877, a station was established here with a simple station building. The northern approach of the Main-Neckar Railway from Frankfurt to Louisa was moved further west between 1885 and 1888 as a result of the construction of the new Frankfurt main freight yard and the new Frankfurt Central Station (now called the Hauptbahnhof).

Passenger trains initially ran between Louisa station and Offenbach to provide connections with services on the Main-Neckar Railway. This service was discontinued in 1895. Subsequently, all passengers had to make this connection via the central station.

In 1997 lines S3 and S4 of the Rhine-Main S-Bahn were opened between Frankfurt Stresemannallee and Darmstadt Hauptbahnhof. Other passenger services stopping at Frankfurt-Louisa were discontinued and the unused platforms were removed. In December 2024 the S-Bahn network was changed and the route to Darmstadt is now served by line S6.

== Origin of the name ==
The name Frankfurt-Louisa refers to the Louisa parcel station (Flurstück Louisa), which was immediately west of the current station. At the beginning of the 19th century the Frankfurt banker and diplomat Simon Moritz von Bethmann (1768–1828) acquired the land the parcel station was built on to create an English garden. After his marriage to Louise Friederike Boode in 1810, Bethmann named the park after his wife. The Bethmann family retained ownership of most of the Park Louisa until 1941. In the north-eastern corner of the site, about 200 metres to the north of the station, the existing Waldspielpark Louisa (Louisa forest playground) was established in 1954.

== Rail services ==
The station is served by S-Bahn line S6, which stops at a central platform on the eastern side of the station area. The tracks used by freight, long-distance passenger and regional trains have no platforms. The four tracks of the Main-Neckar Railway and a connecting curve from the Main Railway run from the south into the station. From the north two tracks run from the Main-Neckar Bridge and three tracks from the connecting curve from Frankfurt South station.

Outside the station, Frankfurt-Louisa stop is served by tram lines 17 and 18.
