= Frankfurt Stresemannallee station =

Railway station in Germany

Frankfurt Stresemannallee
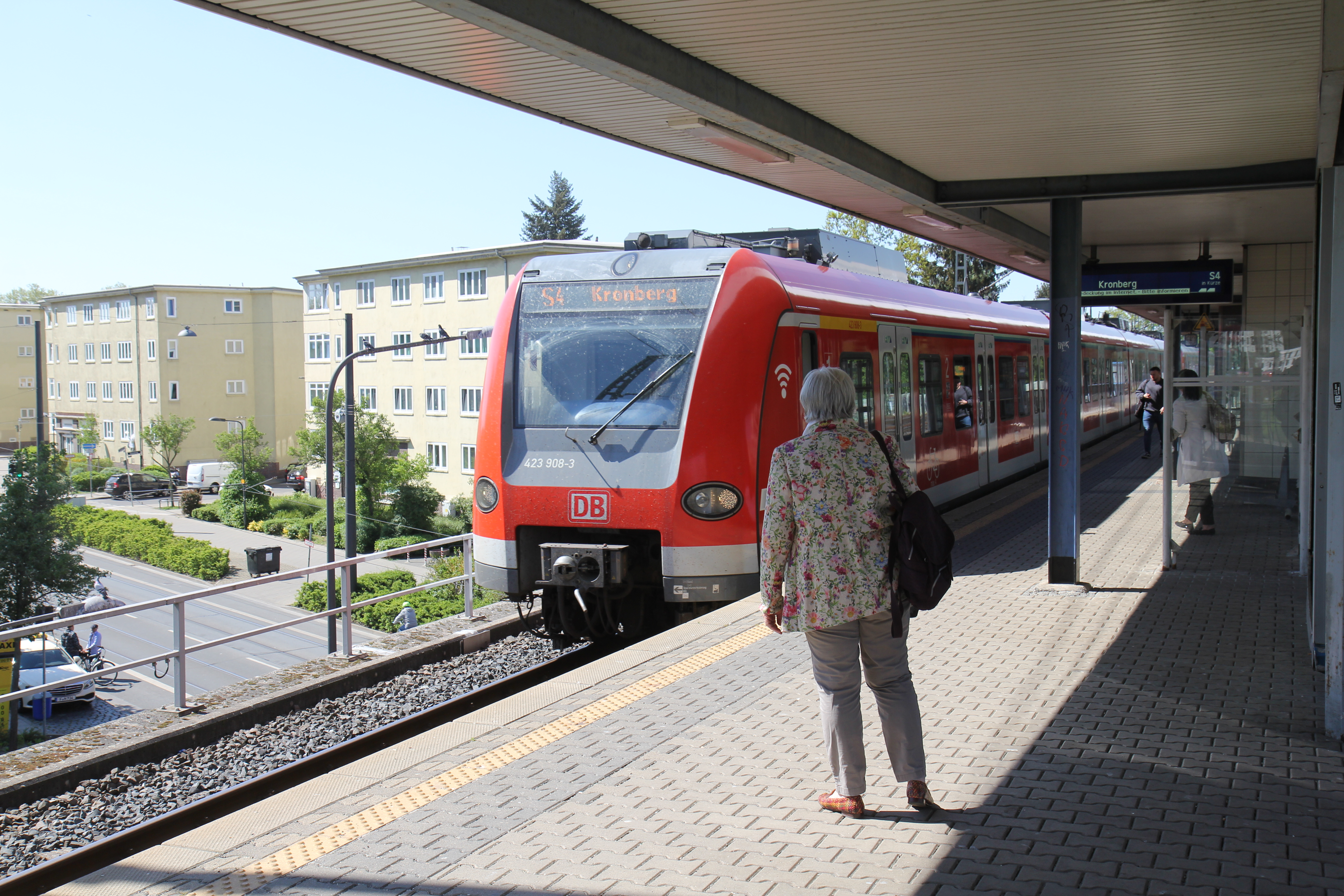
- S-Bahn train at Stresemannallee in 2014

General information
- Location: Stresemannallee; 60596 Frankfurt; Sachsenhausen; Hesse; Germany
- Coordinates: 50.0943620°N 8.6712672°E
- Owner: Deutsche Bahn
- Operator: DB Station&Service
- Line: Frankfurt Süd–Darmstadt (S-Bahn)
- Platforms: 1 island platform
- Tracks: 2
- Train operators: S-Bahn Rhein-Main

Other information
- Station code: 1855
- DS100 code: FSTL
- IBNR: 8002059
- Category: 4
- Fare zone: : 5010
- Website: www.bahnhof.de

Services
Preceding station	Rhine-Main S-Bahn	Following station
Südbahnhof towards Friedberg (Hess)	S6 (Rhine-Main S-Bahn)	Frankfurt-Louisa towards Darmstadt Hbf
Location
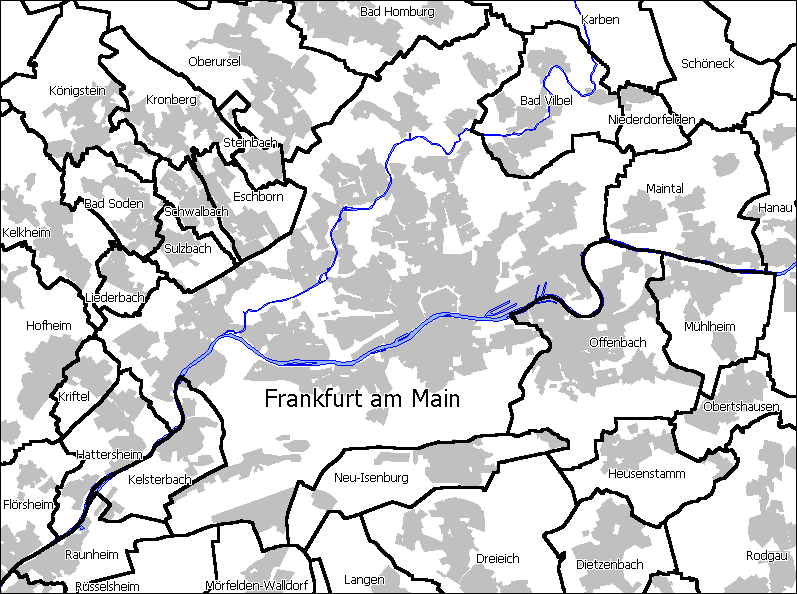
- Location within Frankfurt am Main Location within Hesse Location within Germany Location within Europe

Frankfurt Stresemannallee station is a railway station served by the S6 service of the Rhine-Main S-Bahn in the Sachsenhausen district of Frankfurt, Germany.

== Gallery ==
S-Bahn station Frankfurt/Main Stresemannallee

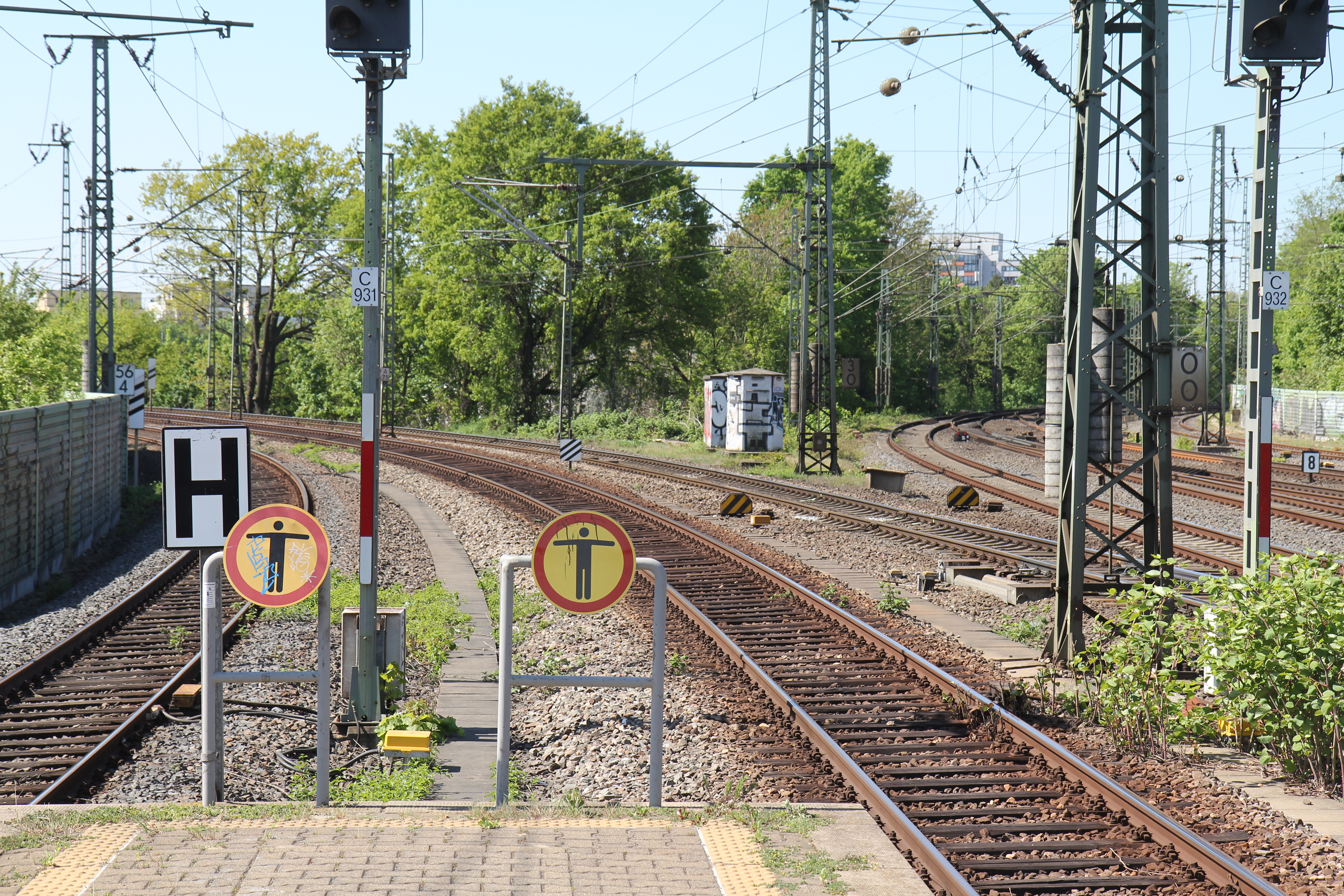
left: km 56.4 of S-Bahn track 3688 to Darmstadt • center: km 0.0 der of link to tracks 3604 of Main-Neckar Railway #3601 • right: 3 km to Frankfurt central station

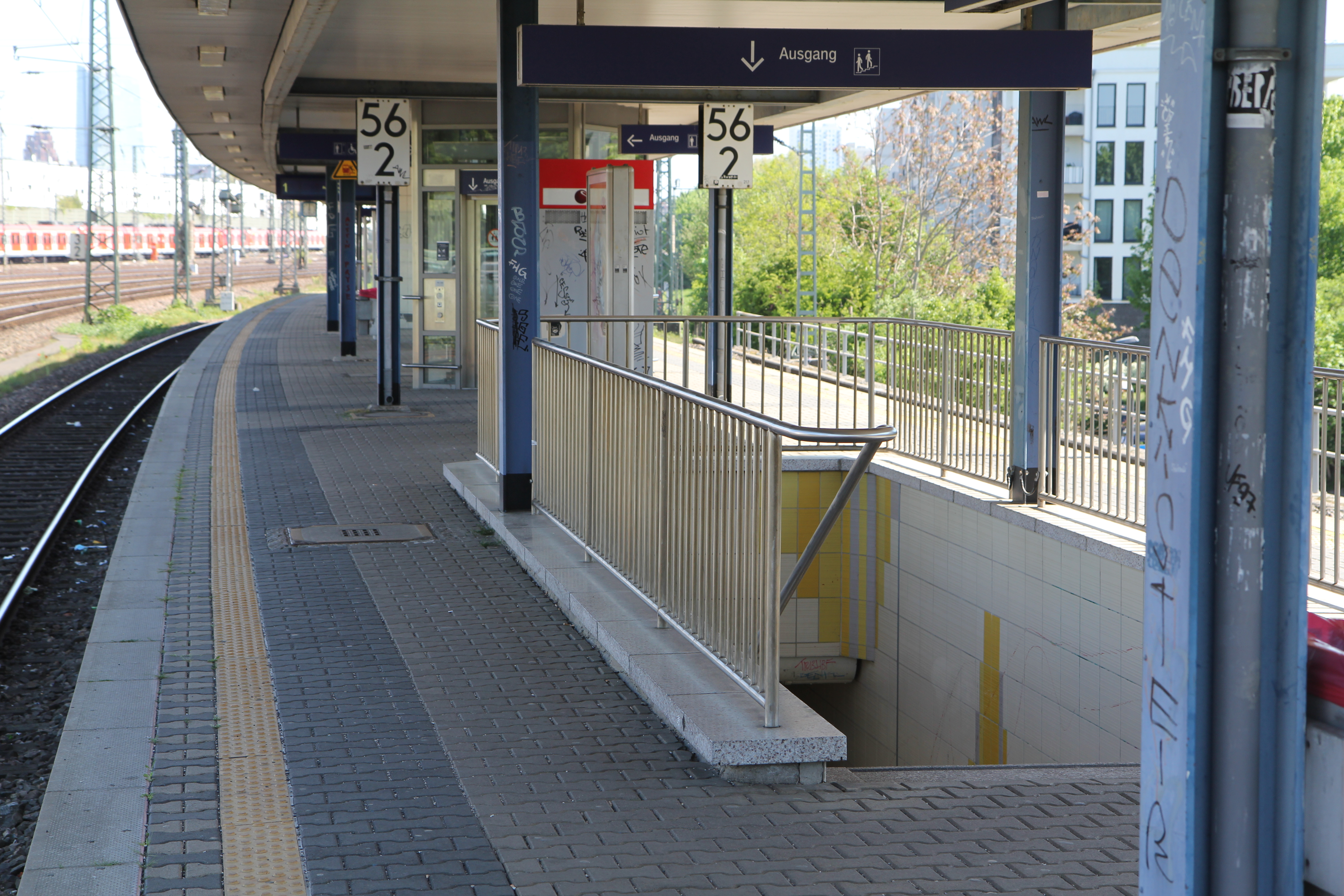
platform with distance signs for S-Bahn 3688 F-Südbahnhof – Darmstadt, looking east

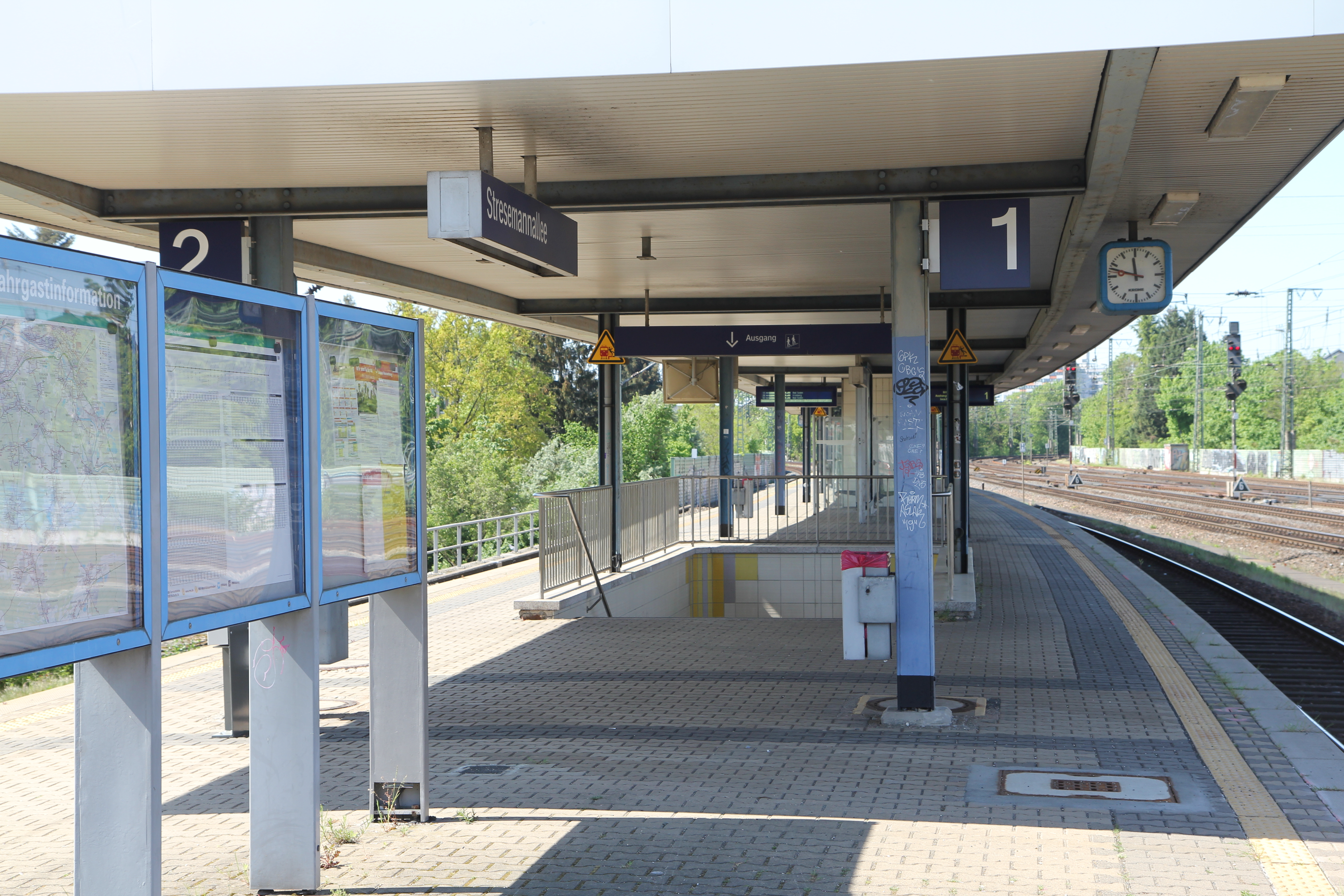
platform, looking west

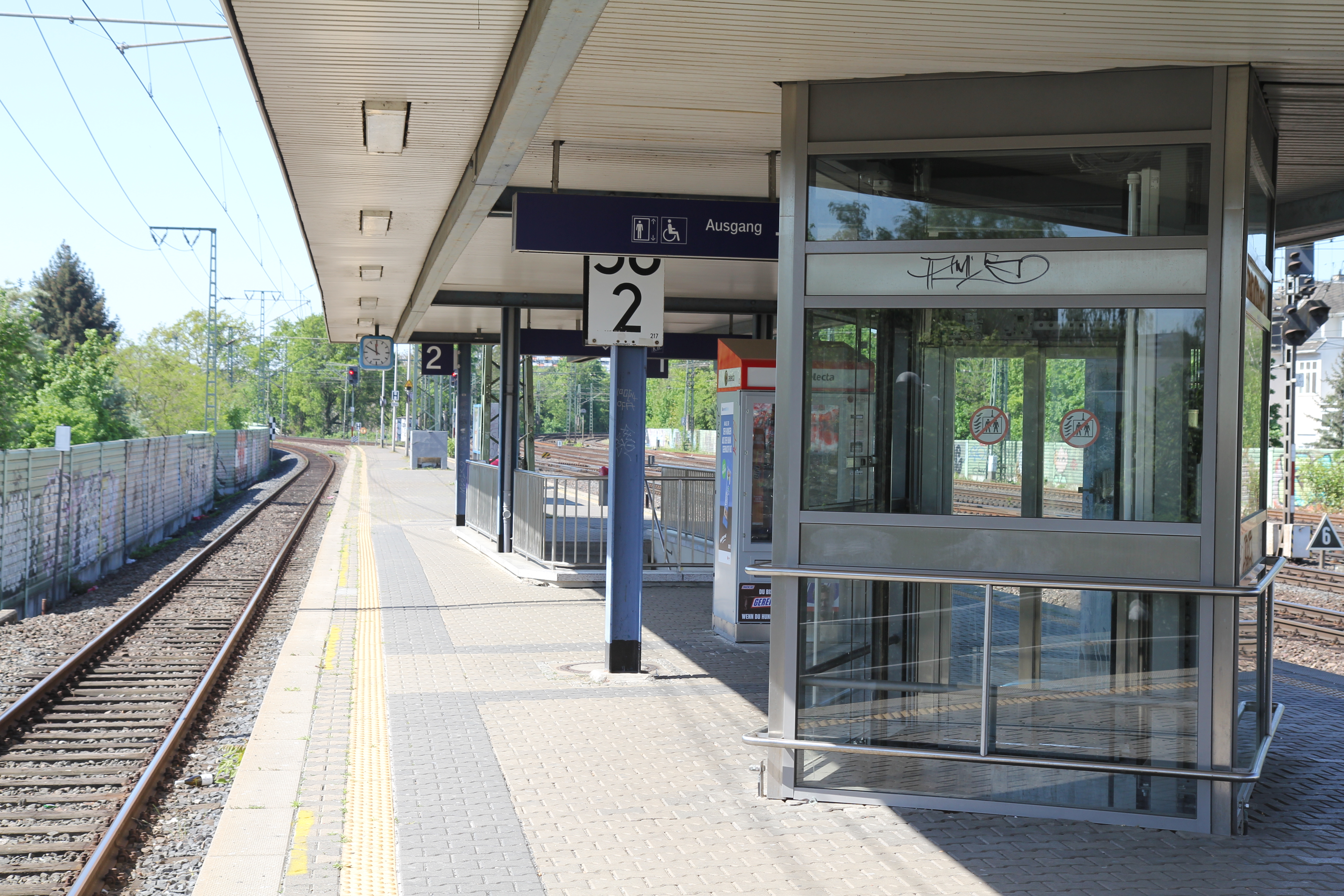
platform with lift, looking west

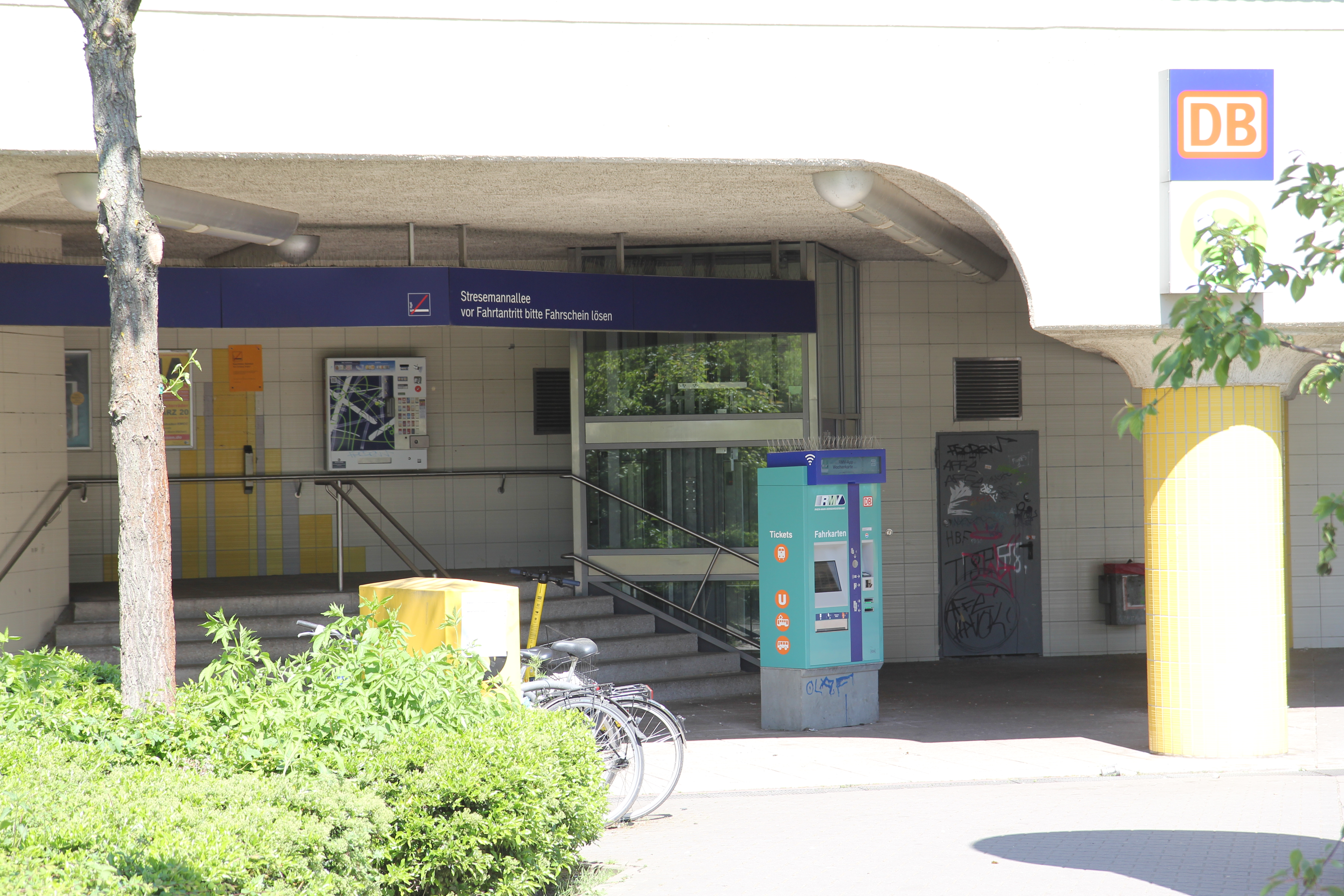
Access to platform from south-west corner of underpass

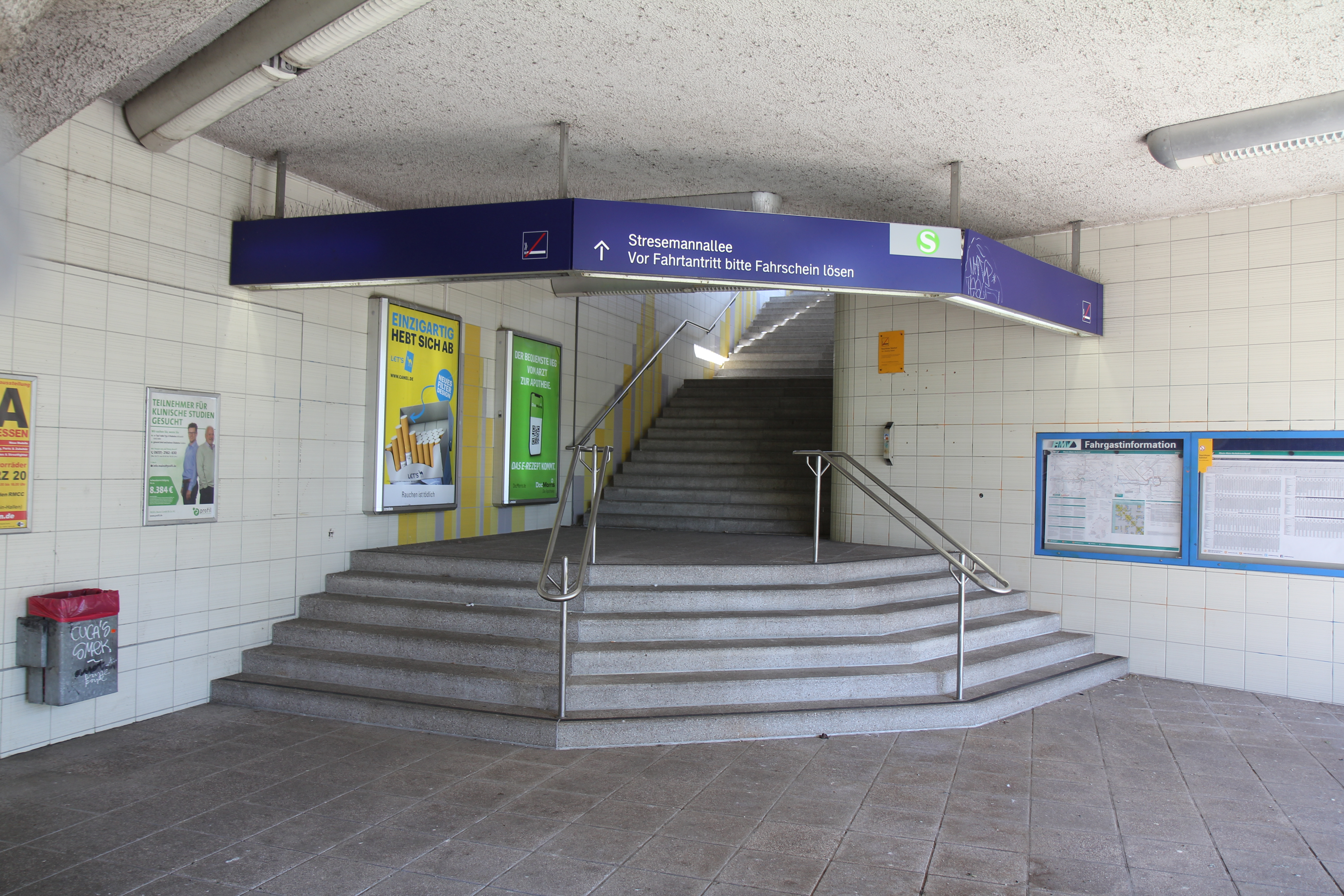
Access to platform from south-east corner of underpass

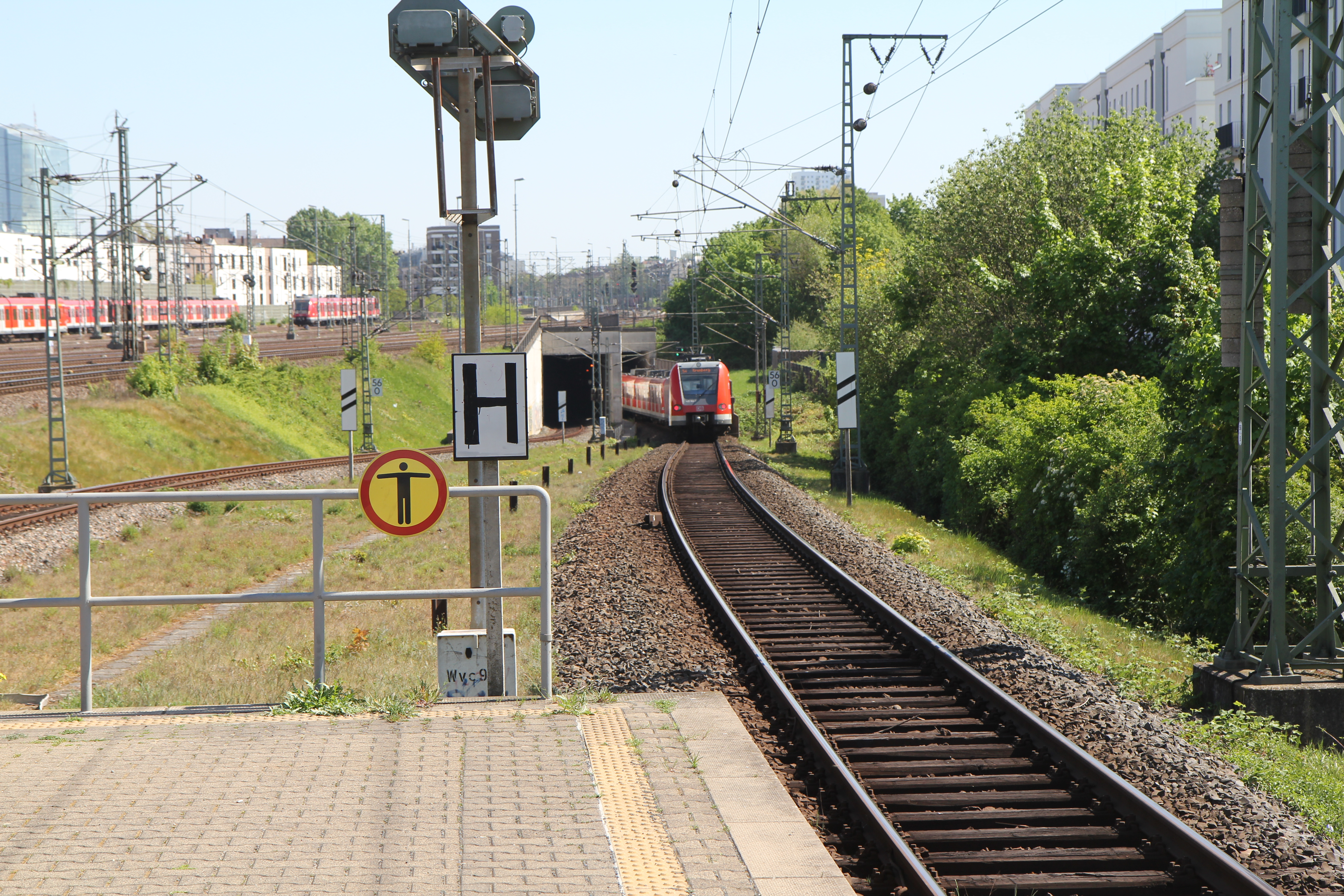
a train entering the tunnel S-Bahn-Tunnel Frankfurt Stresemannallee on its way to 'Südbahnhof and the trunk tunnel
