= Frankfurt-Eschersheim station =

Railway station in Frankfurt, Germany

Frankfurt Eschersheim
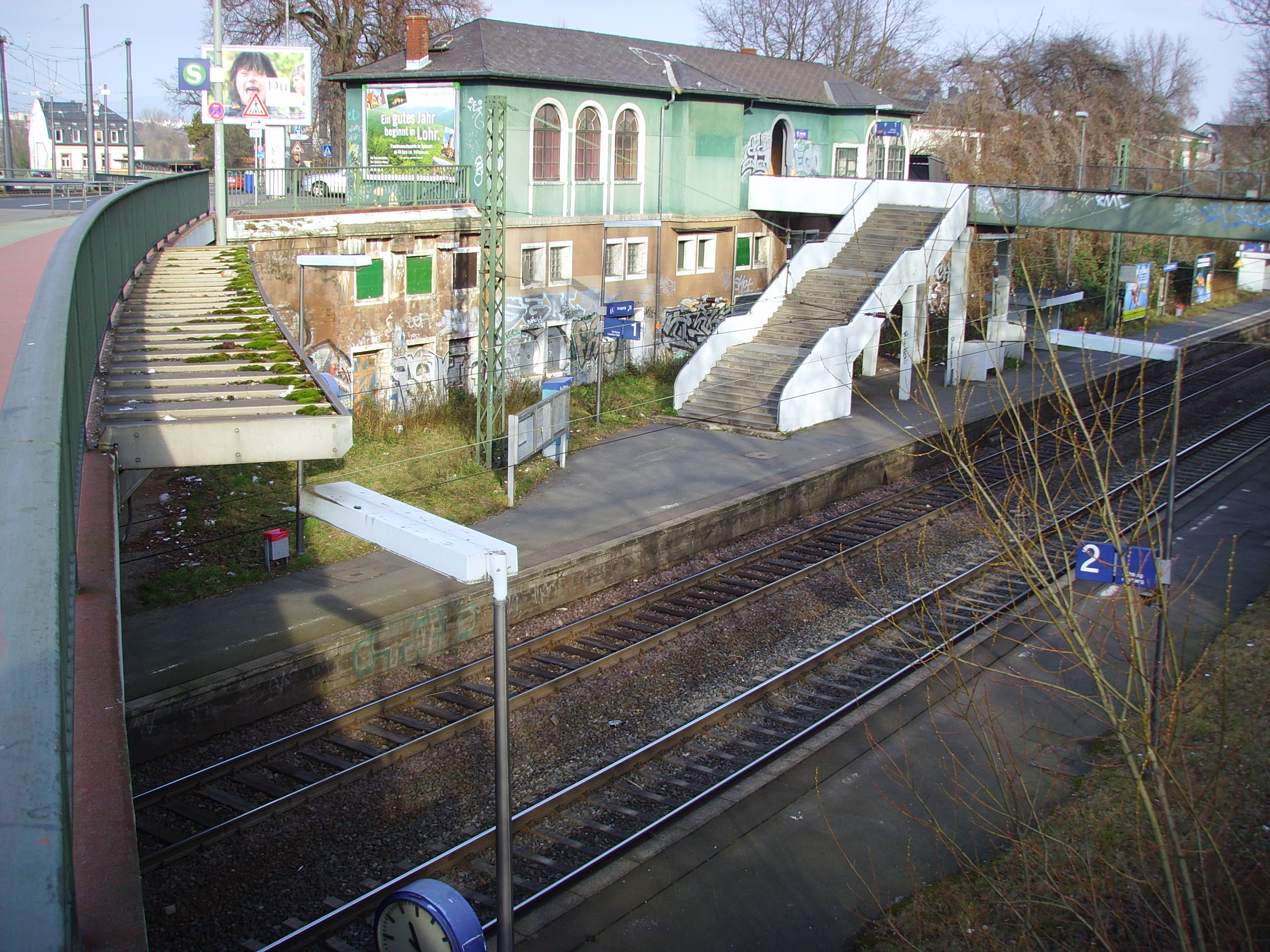
- View of the old Eschersheim station from Maybachbrücke (Maybach bridge)

General information
- Location: Maybachstr. 37, Frankfurt, Hesse; Germany
- Coordinates: 50°9′30″N 8°39′18″E
- Lines: Main–Weser Railway (191.6 km) (KBS 645.6)
- Platforms: 2

Construction
- Accessible: Yes

Other information
- Station code: 1868
- DS100 code: FFES
- Category: 5
- Fare zone: : 5001
- Website: www.bahnhof.de

History
- Opened: 1850

Services
Preceding station	Rhine-Main S-Bahn	Following station
Frankfurt-Frankfurter Berg towards Friedberg (Hess)	S6 (Rhine-Main S-Bahn)	Frankfurt West towards Darmstadt Hbf
Location
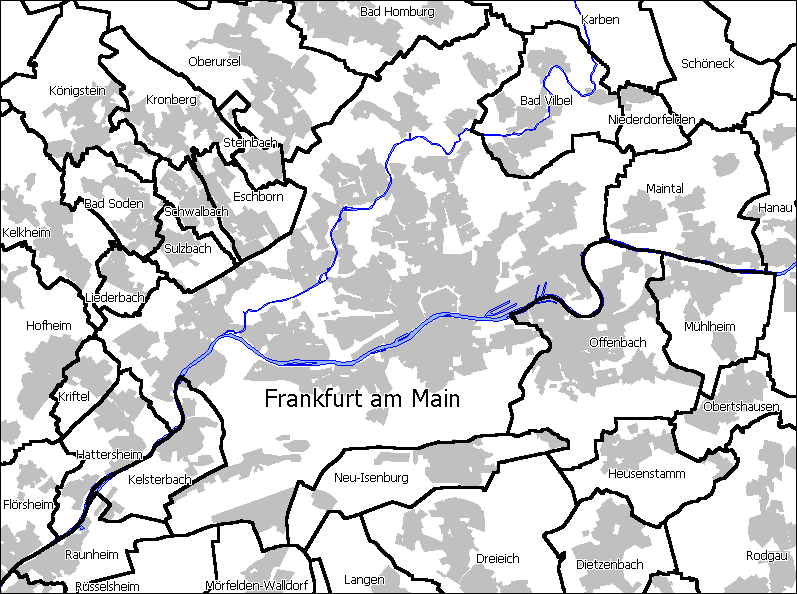
- Location within Frankfurt am Main Location within Hesse Location within Germany Location within Europe

Frankfurt-Eschersheim station is a railway station located in the Eschersheim district of Frankfurt, Germany. The station is classified by Deutsche Bahn as a category 5 station and is part of the Main–Weser Railway.

== Entrance building ==
The station building was built in 1877 and 1913, originally in the neoclassical style. The design is affected by the site's extreme slope: the street is two storeys above platform level. Services are now no longer available for passengers in the station building. The complex gives the impression of neglect.

The initial state of the entrance building has been greatly altered structurally since the beginning of the 20th century, so it is not classified as a monument under the Hessian Heritage Act, unlike many older station buildings to the north on the Main-Weser Railway. The opponents of the planned upgrade of the Main-Weser Railway from two to four tracks between Frankfurt West and (initially) Bad Vilbel have sought to have the entrance building heritage-listed, in an attempt to prevent the laying of two more tracks.

== Services ==
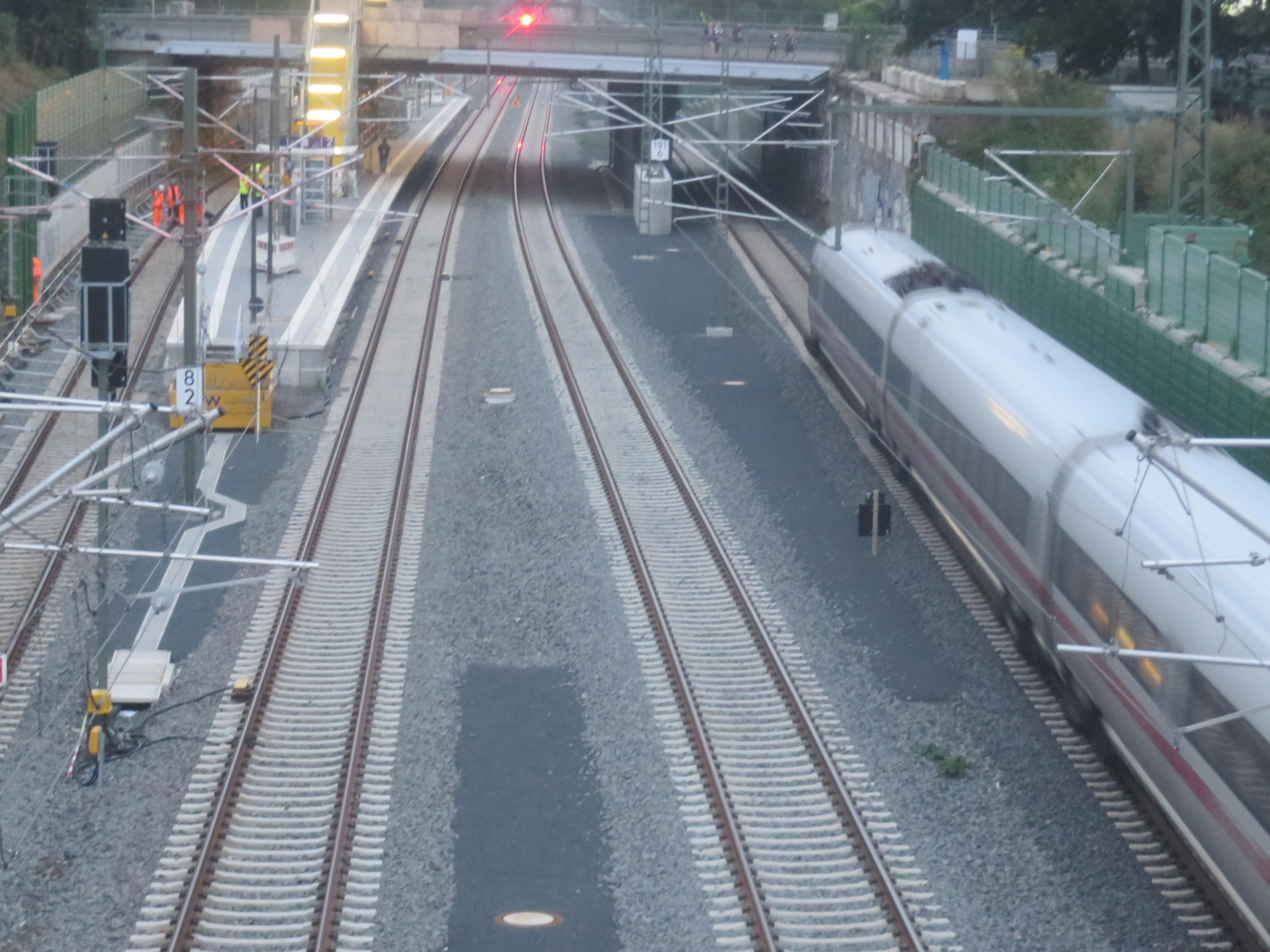
The station after reconstruction, in 2024. On the left, two tracks exclusively for S-Bahn, on the right, two tracks for all other traiffic

The station is served by line S6 of the Rhine-Main S-Bahn. The pedestrian bridge that connects the entrance building on the street with the two external platforms was closed in the autumn of 2008 due to disrepair; it was last painted in 1965. The steps from this crossing towards the Friedberg end of the platform was blocked for several years before being replaced by a bridge connecting to a ramp to Thielenstraße.

At the northern end, along Eschersheimer Landstraße, there was a pedestrian bridge with wooden steps over the tracks, which was demolished in spring 2018. There were also ground-level accesses to the platforms there, which were eliminated during the planned expansion of the railway line to four tracks. There is now only a central platform with access from the Maybach Bridge, with stairs on both sides of the bridge and an elevator on the northeast side (i.e., towards Heddernheim).

=== Public transport ===
Eschersheim station forms a public transport node with the nearby Weißer Stein station of the Frankfurt U-Bahn. Weißer Stein is on line A of the U-Bahn and is served by lines U1, U2, U3 and U8.
