= Darmstadt-Arheilgen station =

Train station in Darmstadt, Germany

Darmstadt Arheilgen
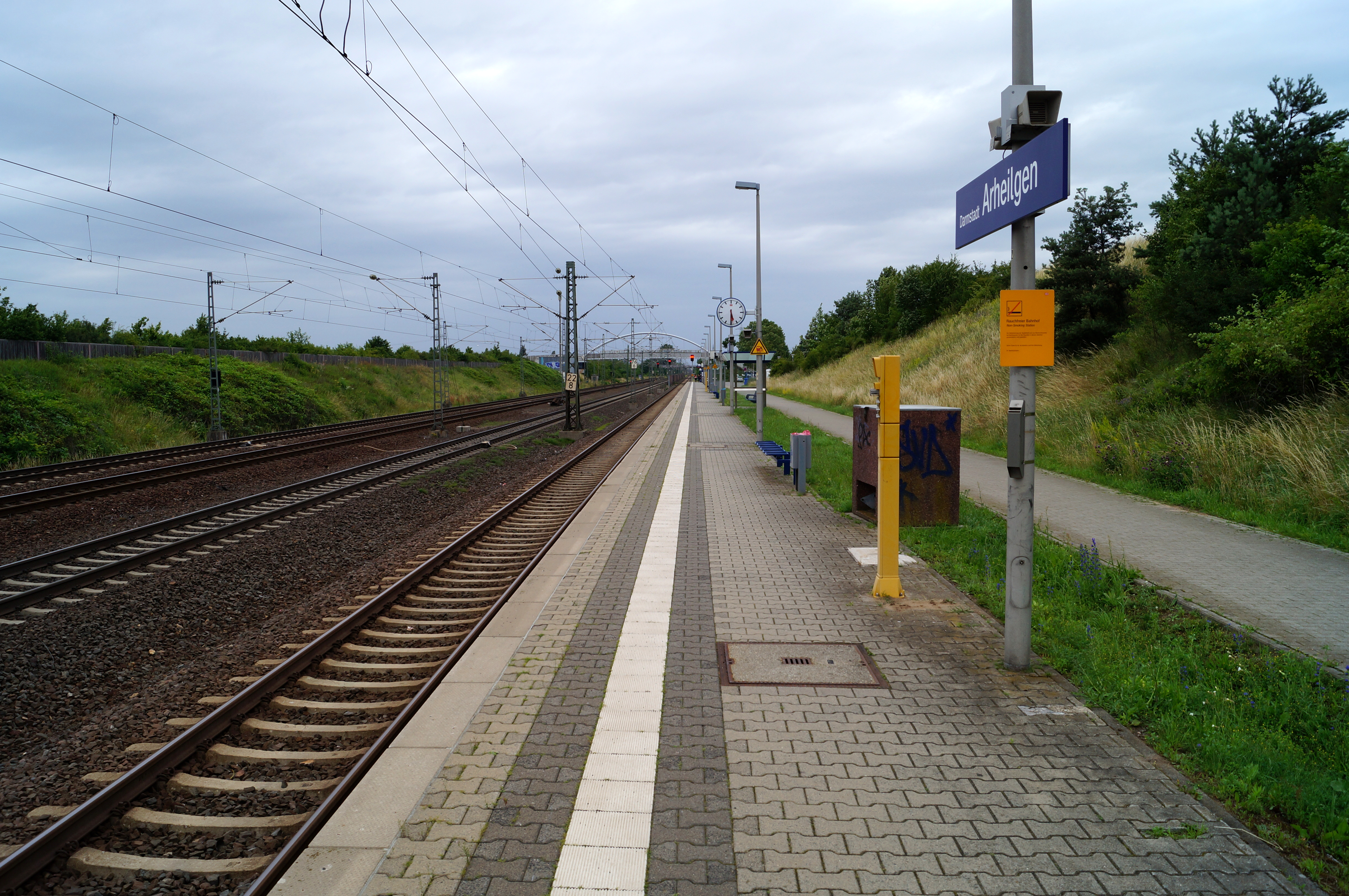
- 2012

General information
- Location: Bahnstraße/Weiterstädter Straße; 64291 Darmstadt; Hesse; Germany
- Coordinates: 49°54′47″N 8°38′44″E
- Owner: DB Netz
- Operator: DB Station&Service
- Lines: Main-Neckar Railway (KBS 650)
- Platforms: 1 side platform
- Tracks: 4
- Train operators: S-Bahn Rhein-Main

Construction
- Parking: yes
- Cycle facilities: yes
- Accessible: yes

Other information
- Station code: 1130
- DS100 code: FDA
- IBNR: 8001378
- Category: 6
- Fare zone: : 4035
- Website: www.bahnhof.de

History
- Opened: 1894; 132 years ago

Services
Preceding station	Rhine-Main S-Bahn	Following station
Darmstadt-Wixhausen towards Friedberg (Hess)	S6 (Rhine-Main S-Bahn)	Darmstadt Hbf Terminus
Location

Darmstadt-Arheilgen station is a railway station in the municipality of Darmstadt, located in Hesse, Germany.
