= Frankfurt West station =

Railway station in Frankfurt, Germany

Frankfurt am Main West
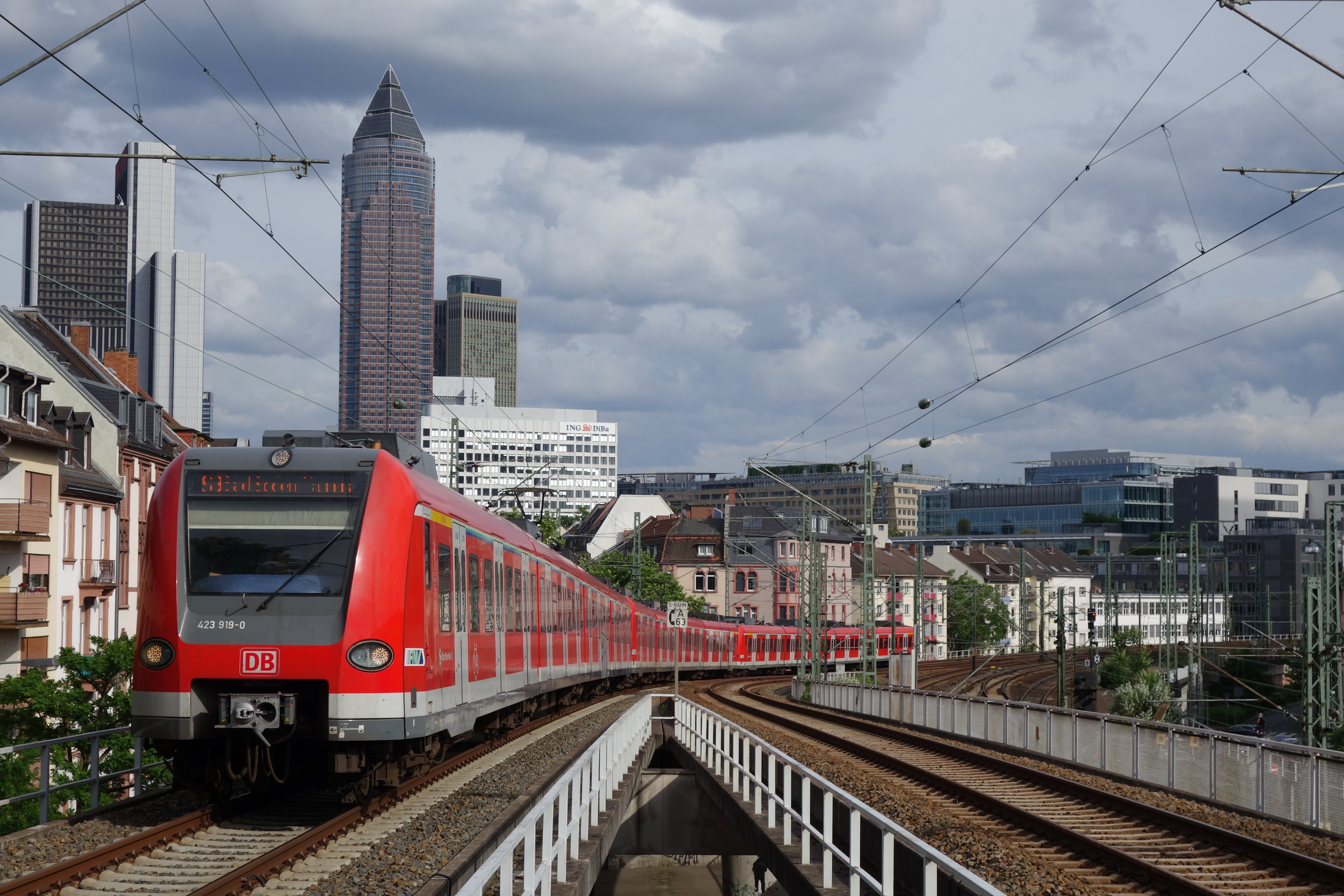
- DBAG Class 423 approaching the elevated section

General information
- Location: Kasseler Str. 7, Frankfurt, Hesse; Germany
- Coordinates: 50°07′09″N 8°38′22″E
- Line: Main-Weser Railway (KBS 630)
- Platforms: 3 main line; 2 S-Bahn

Construction
- Accessible: Platform 3 only
- Architect: Julius Eugen Ruhl

Other information
- Station code: 1858
- DS100 code: FFW
- Category: 3
- Fare zone: : 5001
- Website: www.bahnhof.de

History
- Opened: 1848

Services
Preceding station	DB Fernverkehr	Following station
Bad Nauheim towards Dortmund Hbf or Münster Hbf	IC 34	Frankfurt (Main) Hbf Terminus
Preceding station	DB Regio Mitte	Following station
Frankfurt (Main) Hbf Terminus	RB 34	Bad Vilbel towards Glauburg-Stockheim
Preceding station	Hessische Landesbahn	Following station
Friedberg towards Dillenburg	RB 40	Frankfurt (Main) Hbf Terminus
Friedberg towards Treysa	RB 41	Frankfurt (Main) Hbf Terminus
Preceding station	Rhine-Main S-Bahn	Following station
Rödelheim towards Bad Soden	S3 (Rhine-Main S-Bahn)	Frankfurt Messe towards Südbahnhof
Rödelheim towards Kronberg	S4 (Rhine-Main S-Bahn)	Frankfurt Messe towards Südbahnhof
Rödelheim towards Friedrichsdorf	S5 (Rhine-Main S-Bahn)	Frankfurt Messe towards Südbahnhof
Eschersheim towards Friedberg (Hess)	S6 (Rhine-Main S-Bahn)	Frankfurt Messe towards Darmstadt Hbf
Location
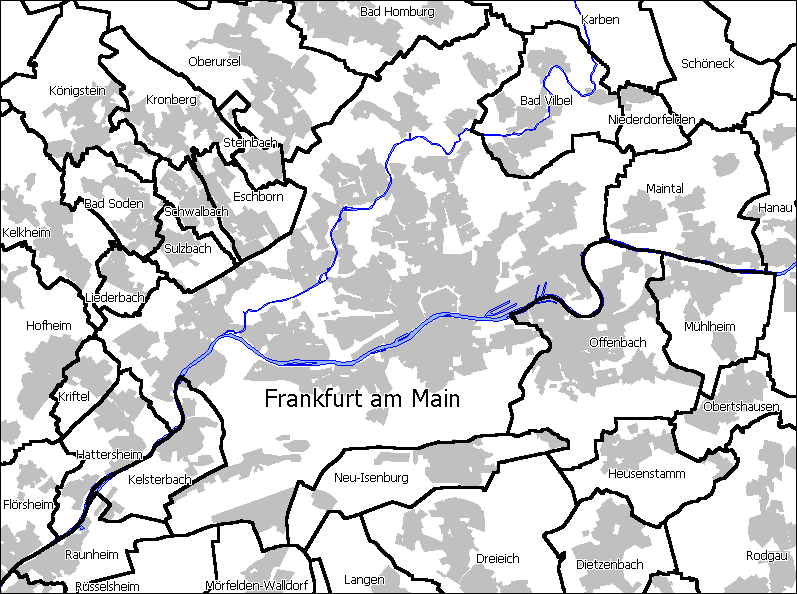
- Location within Frankfurt am Main Location within Hesse Location within Germany Location within Europe

Frankfurt (Main) West station (German: Bahnhof Frankfurt (Main) West or Frankfurt Westbahnhof) is a railway station for regional and S-Bahn services in Frankfurt, Germany, on the Main-Weser Railway, in the district of Bockenheim, near the Frankfurt Trade Fair grounds and the Bockenheim campus of the Goethe University Frankfurt.

== History ==
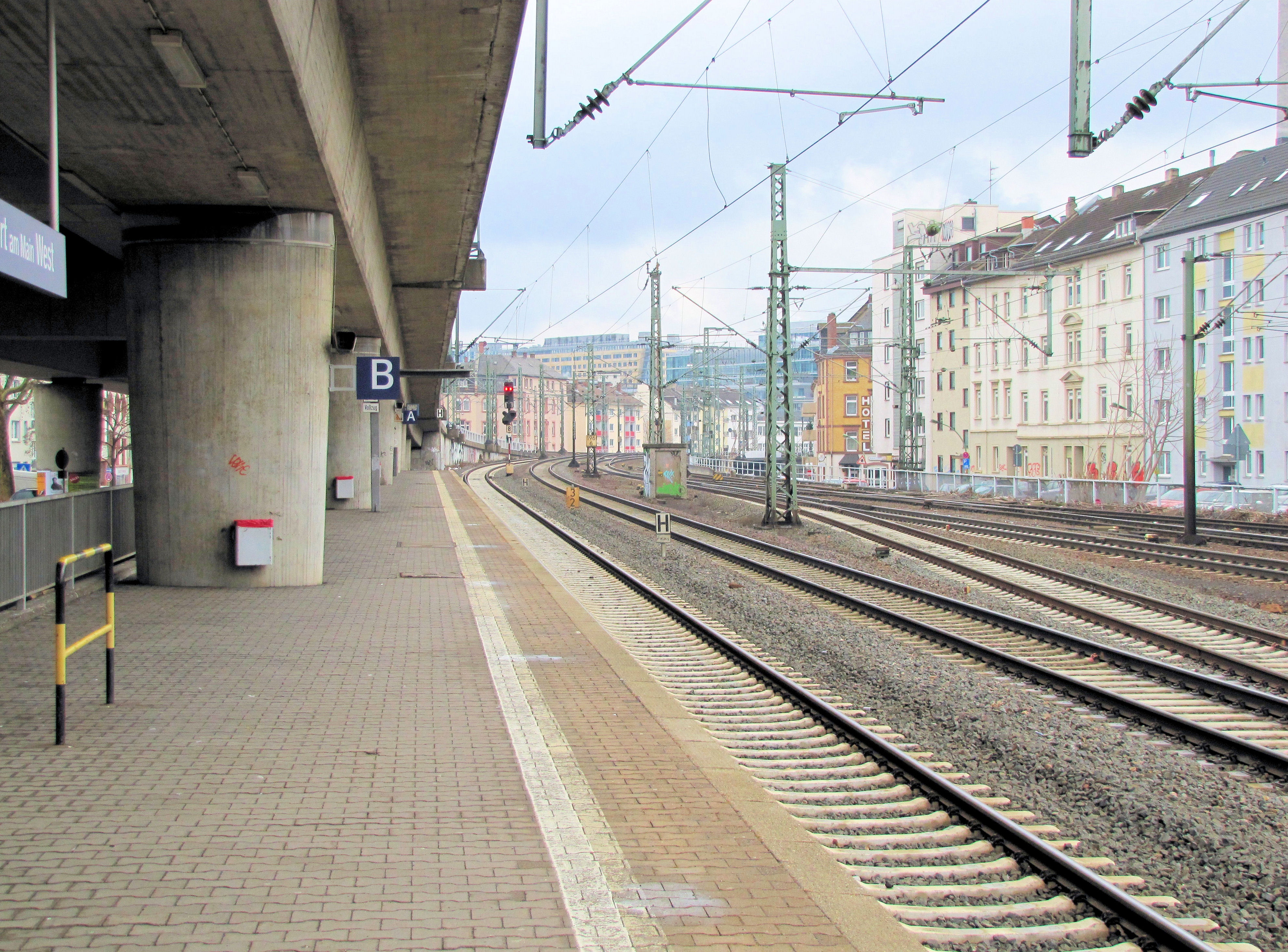
Platform for S6 city-bound services

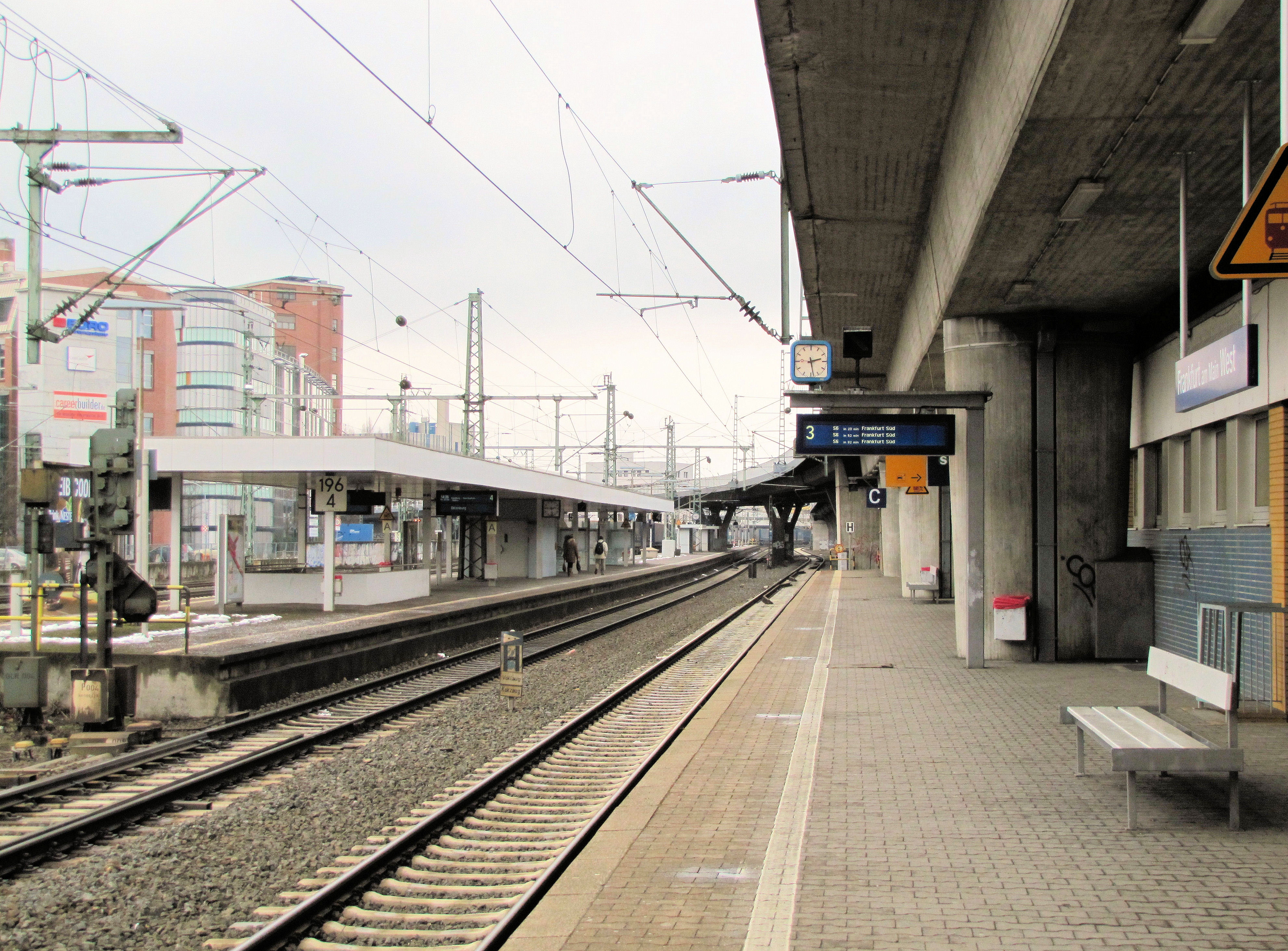
Platforms for regional and S6 city-bound services, looking north

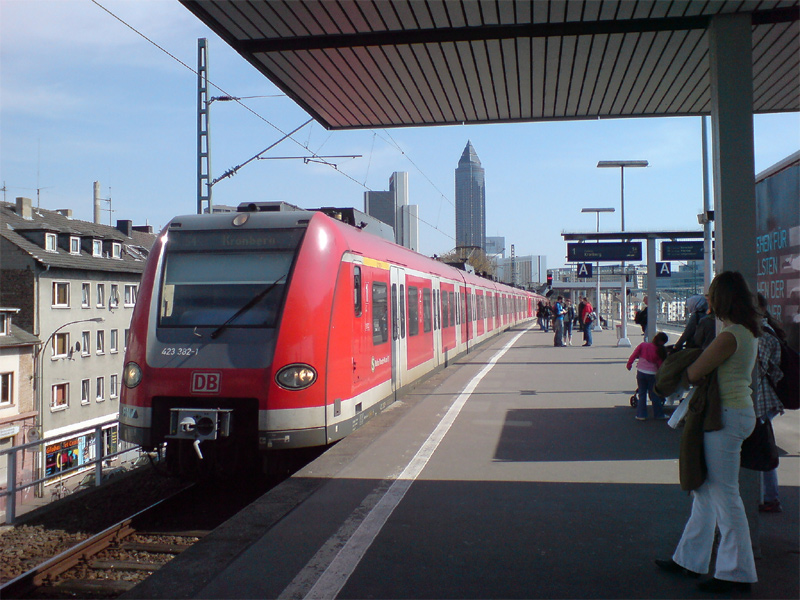
Platform 1 on upper level

The station was opened as Bockenheim station in 1849 during the construction of the Main-Weser Railway from Frankfurt to Kassel. The then independent city of Bockenheim was until 1866 in the territory of the Electorate of Hesse-Kassel. The station building was built in a relatively elaborate Renaissance Revival style to a design by Julius Eugen Ruhl.

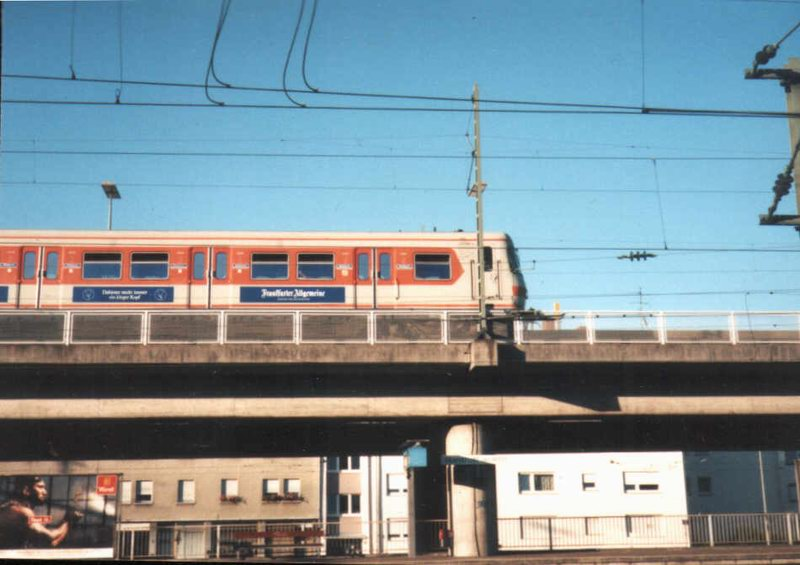
Elevated section with S-train-Electric multiple unit DB Class 420 in its original design

The first major change in the railways to affect Bockenheim station occurred in 1888 with the opening of the new Frankfurt Central Station. As part of this project a connection was opened on 10 May 1884 from Bockenheim to the Homburg Railway, a connection that could not be built fifteen years earlier during the Homburg line's original construction because the various small states involved failed to come to an agreement.

In addition, a sweeping curve was built for the Main-Weser line's northern approach to the new Central Station. The old line ran from the old Main-Weser terminus to Am Hauptbahnhof (the square in front of the Hauptbahnhof) along the current Kaiserstraße and then turned north. Its abandoned path to Bockenheim was turned into a street, which was initially called Bahnstraße, and it is now a series of streets: Hamburger Allee, Friedrich-Ebert-Anlage and Düsseldorfer Straße.

== Modern station ==
In 1913, the station was renamed Frankfurt West. The historic station building was destroyed in World War II. A modern functional building was built in 1961. During the building of the S-Bahn in the 1970s most of this station was demolished and replaced by a simple building, which seems to be tucked under the elevated S-Bahn line.

The current station has two levels. The ground level is used by regional trains and S-Bahn S6 trains towards the city on platforms 3, 4 and 5. The S-Bahn lines S3, S4 and S5 and S6 towards Friedberg use an approximately one kilometre long elevated section with a two-track elevated station (platforms 1 and 2).

== Services ==
Line 17 of the Frankfurt tramway, which opened in 2003, touches the southern end of the Westbahnhof (Nauheimer Straße and Kuhwaldstraße stops). The tram stop on the forecourt of Westbahnhof was last served by the extended tram line 16 in July and August 2019 due to construction work on the tram network.

The M32 bus line runs from Westbahnhof via Frankfurt Nordend and Bornheim to Ostbahnhof. The M36 bus line connects Westbahnhof with Johann-Wolfgang-Goethe University and the city centre, and the M73 bus line connects the districts of Hausen, Praunheim and Nordweststadt. The planned ring tram will have a stop called Westbahnhof in the neighbouring Schloßstraße.

The regional express trains RE 30 Kassel - Marburg - Gießen - Frankfurt (Main-Weser-Express) and RE 99 Siegen - Gießen - Frankfurt (Main-Sieg-Express) as well as all through trains of the Niddertalbahn (RB 34) to Frankfurt Hbf stop mainly during rush hours. In addition, the Mittelhessen-Express (RB 40/41) always stops at this station. Two northbound double-decker IC trains serve Frankfurt Westbahnhof each day (IC 34). In the 2026 timetable, the following services stopped at the station:
