= Frankfurt-Berkersheim station =

Railway station in Germany

Frankfurt Berkersheim
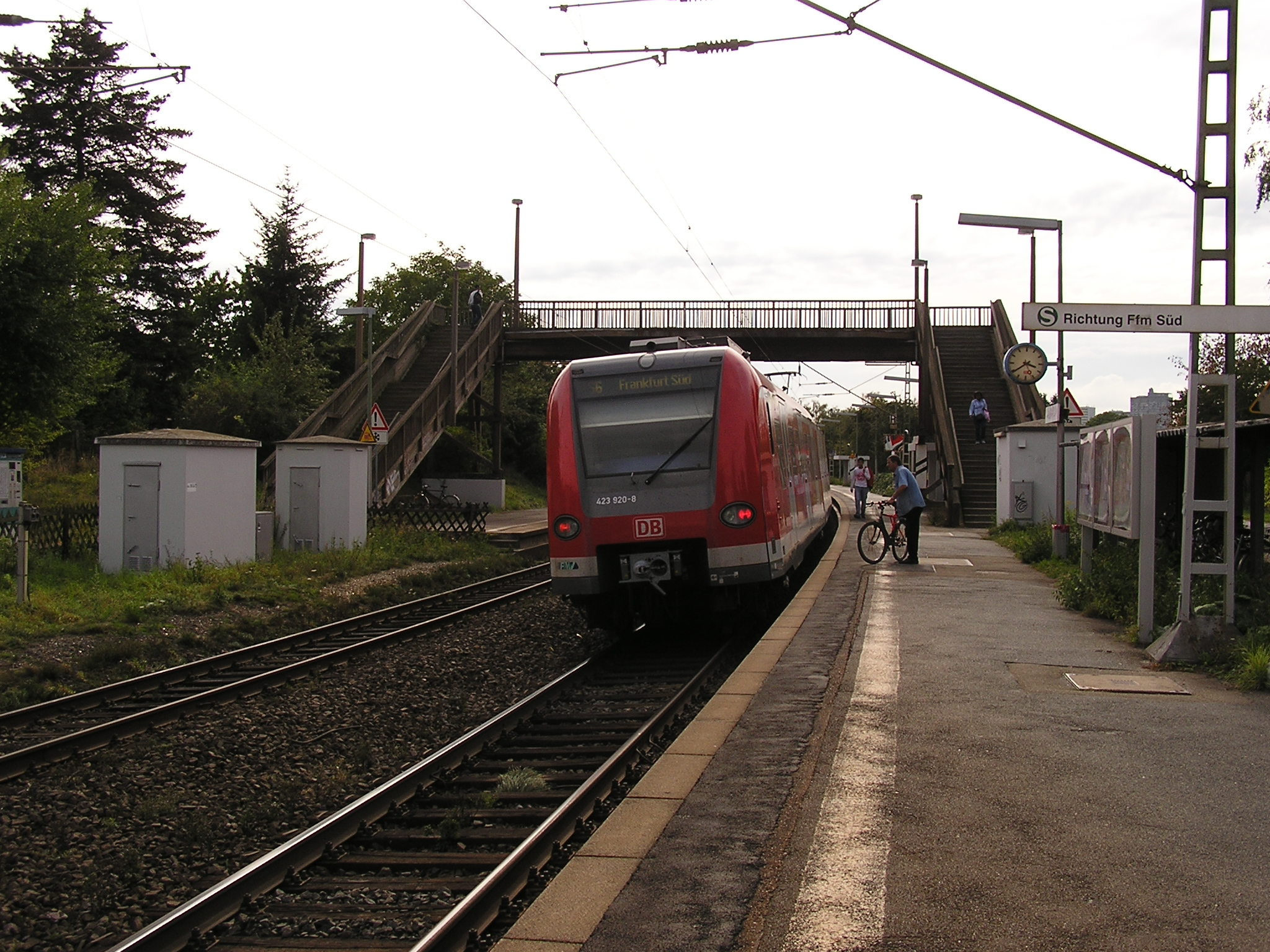

General information
- Location: Berkersheimer Bahnstraße 138; 60435 Frankfurt, Hesse; Berkersheim; Germany
- Coordinates: 50°10′35″N 8°41′52″E
- Owner: DB Netz
- Operator: DB Station&Service
- Line: Main–Weser Railway
- Platforms: 2 side platforms
- Tracks: 2
- Train operators: S-Bahn Rhein-Main

Other information
- Station code: 1867
- DS100 code: FFBK
- IBNR: 8002043
- Category: 5
- Fare zone: : 5046
- Website: www.bahnhof.de

Services
Preceding station	Rhine-Main S-Bahn	Following station
Bad Vilbel Süd towards Friedberg (Hess)	S6 (Rhine-Main S-Bahn)	Frankfurt-Eschersheim towards Darmstadt Hbf
Location

Frankfurt-Berkersheim station is a railway station in the Berkersheim district of Frankfurt, Germany.
