= Darmstadt-Wixhausen station =

Railway station in Darmstadt, Germany

Darmstadt-Wixhausen
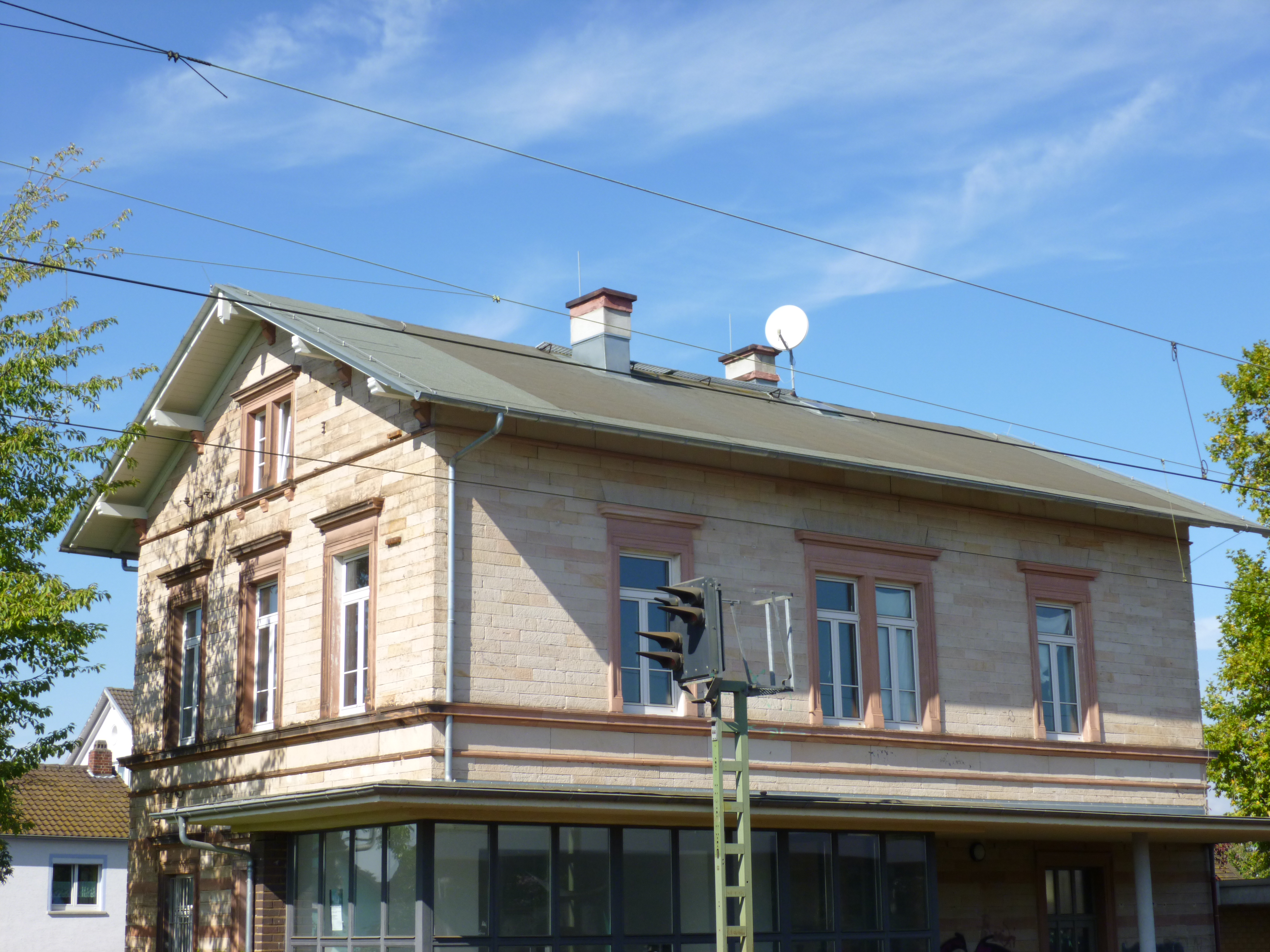
- 2012

General information
- Location: Bahnhofstraße 2; 64291 Darmstadt; Hesse; Germany
- Coordinates: 49°55′51″N 8°38′52″E
- System: Hp
- Owner: DB Netz
- Operator: DB Station&Service
- Lines: Main-Neckar Railway (KBS 650)
- Platforms: 1 side platform
- Tracks: 3
- Train operators: S-Bahn Rhein-Main

Construction
- Parking: yes
- Cycle facilities: yes
- Accessible: yes

Other information
- Station code: 6843
- DS100 code: FWX
- IBNR: 8006528
- Category: 6
- Fare zone: : 4035
- Website: www.bahnhof.de

Services
Preceding station	Rhine-Main S-Bahn	Following station
Erzhausen towards Friedberg (Hess)	S6 (Rhine-Main S-Bahn)	Darmstadt-Arheilgen towards Darmstadt Hbf
Location
- Location within Hesse Location within Germany Location within Europe

Darmstadt-Wixhausen station is a railway station in the municipality of Darmstadt, located in Hesse, Germany.
