= Bad Vilbel Süd station =

Railway station in Germany

Bad Vilbel Süd

General information
- Location: Am Südbahnhof 1; 61118 Bad Vilbel, Hesse; Germany
- Coordinates: 50°10′43″N 8°44′01″E
- Owner: DB Netz
- Operator: DB Station&Service
- Line: Main–Weser Railway
- Platforms: 2 side platforms
- Tracks: 2
- Train operators: S-Bahn Rhein-Main

Other information
- Station code: 359
- DS100 code: FVLS
- IBNR: 8000761
- Category: 5
- Fare zone: : 2601
- Website: www.bahnhof.de

Services
Preceding station	Rhine-Main S-Bahn	Following station
Bad Vilbel towards Friedberg (Hess)	S6 (Rhine-Main S-Bahn)	Frankfurt-Berkersheim towards Darmstadt Hbf
Location
- Location within Hesse

Bad Vilbel Süd station is a railway station in the southern part of the town of Bad Vilbel, in Hesse, Germany.

== See also ==
- Bad Vilbel station
