= Eschersheim =

- Stadtteil of Frankfurt am Main
- Location of Eschersheim (red) and the Ortsbezirk Mitte-Nord (light red) within Frankfurt am Main
- Interactive map of Eschersheim
- Location within Germany Location within Hesse
- Coordinates: 50°09′25″N 08°39′21″E
- Country: Germany
- State: Hesse
- Admin. region: Darmstadt
- District: Urban district
- City: Frankfurt am Main

Area
  - Total: 3.339 km^{2} (1.289 sq mi)

Population (2020-12-31)
  - Total: 15,323
  - Density: 4,589/km^{2} (11,890/sq mi)
- Time zone: UTC+01:00 (CET)
  - Summer (DST): UTC+02:00 (CEST)
- Postal codes: 60433, 60431
- Dialling codes: 069
- Vehicle registration: F
- Website: www.eschersheim.de

Eschersheim (German pronunciation: [ˈɛʃɐshaɪm]) is a city district of Frankfurt am Main, Germany. It is part of the Ortsbezirk Mitte-Nord and is subdivided into the Stadtbezirke Eschersheim-Nord and Eschersheim-Süd.

Eschersheim, with a historical record beginning around 1000, is a district in the north of Frankfurt. It sits above the Nidda River and on the opposite bank from Heddernheim. The old part of Eschersheim, "Alt-Eschersheim", is situated between the railroad and the public swimming pool. The patronage was held since 1467 by the Benedictine monastery Seligenstadt. Ecclesiastical Middle Authority was the Archdeacon of the provost of St. Peter in Mainz.

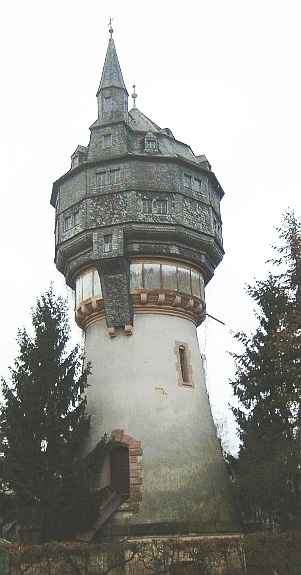
The old water tower in Eschersheim

Around 1900 Eschersheim, previously a rural village without industry, became a wealthy residential area; it was incorporated into Frankfurt in 1910. In the twenties and thirties Walter Gropius built the new settlement "Am Lindenbaum," around the water tower in the southern part of the district. In the fifties, more living complexes were built.

One of Eschersheim's oldest landmarks is an ancient lime tree planted sometime shortly after 1648 to mark the end of the Thirty Years' War.

== Notable people ==
- Friedrich Wöhler (1800–1882) chemist, known especially for his synthesis of urea, was born in Eschersheim.
