= East Station =

East Station may refer to:

== Australia ==
- East Maitland railway station
- East Grange railway station
- East Hills railway station
- East Ipswich railway station
- East Richmond railway station (disambiguation)

== Denmark ==
- Aarhus East station
- Copenhagen East station

== France ==
- Gare de l'Est (Paris East)

== Germany ==
- Berlin Ostbahnhof (Berlin East)
- Frankfurt East station
- Hildesheim Ost railway station
- München Ost station (Munich East)
- Offenbach Ost station
- Ratingen Ost station
- Saarbrücken-Ost station
- Wiesbaden Ost station (Wiesbaden East)

== Hungary ==
- Budapest Keleti railway station (Budapest Eastern)

== People's Republic of China ==
- Beijing East railway station
- Chengdu East railway station
- Guangzhou East railway station
  - Guangzhou East Railway Station (metro), the adjoining Guangzhou Metro station
- Hangzhou East railway station
- Ningbo East railway station
- Shenzhen East railway station
- Zhengzhou East railway station

== Poland ==
- Warszawa Wschodnia railway station (Warsaw East)

== Portugal ==
- Gare do Oriente (Lisbon Oriente Station)

== Sweden ==
- Stockholm Östra Station (Stockholm East)
- Umeå Östra Station (Umeå East)

== Switzerland ==
- Aareschlucht Ost MIB railway station
- Biberist Ost railway station
- Interlaken Ost railway station
- La Chaux-de-Fonds-Est railway station
- Les Coeudres-Est railway station, La Sagne; see La Chaux-de-Fonds–Les Ponts-de-Martel railway
- Petit-Martel-Est railway station, Les Ponts-de-Martel; see La Chaux-de-Fonds–Les Ponts-de-Martel railway

== United Kingdom ==
- Aldgate East tube station, London
- East Acton tube station, London
- Canterbury East railway station
- East Croydon railway station, London
- Dagenham East tube station, London
- East Didsbury railway station
- East Dulwich railway station, London
- Ewell East railway station
- East Finchley tube station, London
- Hertford East railway station
- Hounslow East tube station, London
- Maidstone East railway station
- Mill Hill East tube station, London
- Penge East railway station, London
- Peterborough East railway station
- East Putney tube station, London
- Runcorn East railway station
- Southend East railway station
- East Tilbury railway station
- East Worthing railway station

== See also ==
- Gare de l'Est (disambiguation) (French: Train Station of the East)
- East (disambiguation)
- West Station (disambiguation)
- North Station (disambiguation)
- South Station (disambiguation)
