= Mühlheim-Dietesheim station =

Railway station serving Mühlheim am Main in Hesse, Germany

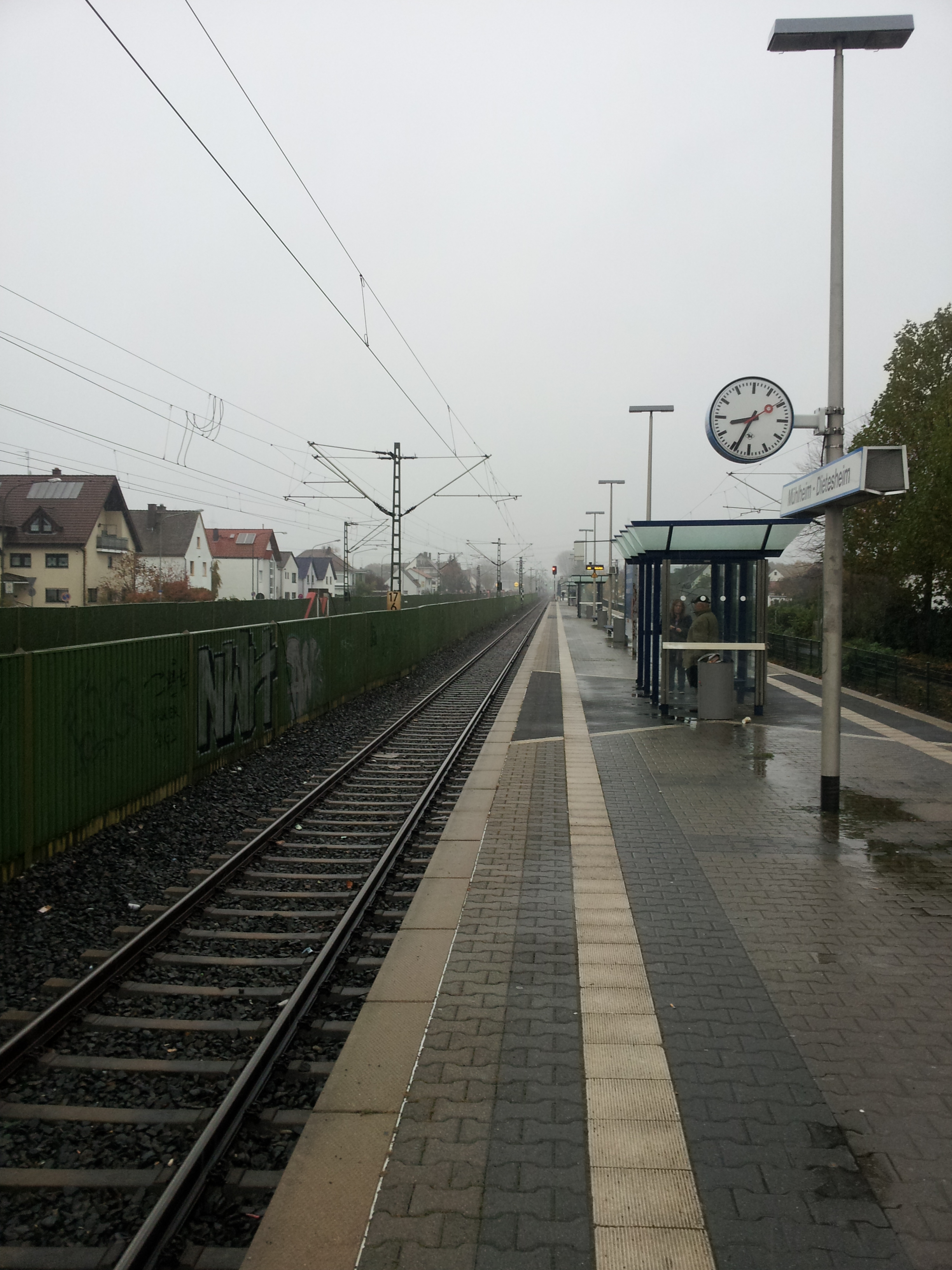
- Mühlheim-Dietesheim railway station from the western entrance.

General information
- Location: Mühlheim am Main, Hesse; Germany
- Coordinates: 50°07′14″N 8°51′32″E
- System: S-Bahn station
- Lines: Frankfurt Schlachthof–Hanau railway (km 69.9) (KBS 645.8/9)
- Platforms: 2

Other information
- Station code: 7168
- DS100 code: FMHD
- Category: 5
- Fare zone: : 3630
- Website: www.bahnhof.de

History
- Opened: c. 1995

Services
| Preceding station | Rhine-Main S-Bahn | Following station |
|---|---|---|
| Mühlheim (Main) towards Wiesbaden Hbf | S8 (Rhine-Main S-Bahn) | Steinheim (Main) towards Hanau Hbf |
| Mühlheim (Main) towards Wiesbaden Hbf | S9 (Rhine-Main S-Bahn) | Steinheim (Main) towards Hanau Hbf |
Location

Mühlheim-Dietesheim station is a railway station serving the town of Mühlheim am Main, approximately 13 km to the east of the city of Frankfurt am Main in Hesse, Germany. Its two platforms are served by S-Bahn lines S8 and S9, which run from Wiesbaden in the west to Hanau in the east via Frankfurt Airport, Frankfurt Hauptbahnhof and the city tunnel, and Offenbach Ost. Trains call approximately every half an hour during the day, with more frequent quarter-hourly services during the rush hour. Late in the evenings, early in the mornings, and on Sundays, services are restricted to once an hour in either direction, as other S8 and S9 services terminate at Offenbach Ost instead of Hanau Hauptbahnhof.

The Frankfurt–Göttingen railway, built in 1863, runs past Mühlheim-Dietesheim, but no train services on the line call at the station. The station was opened in the mid-1990s, following the completion of the Frankfurt Schlachthof–Hanau railway and the expansion of the Rhine-Main S-Bahn network.
