= Offenbach City Tunnel =

Railway tunnel in Hesse, Germany

Coordinates: 50.0994°N 8.7607°E

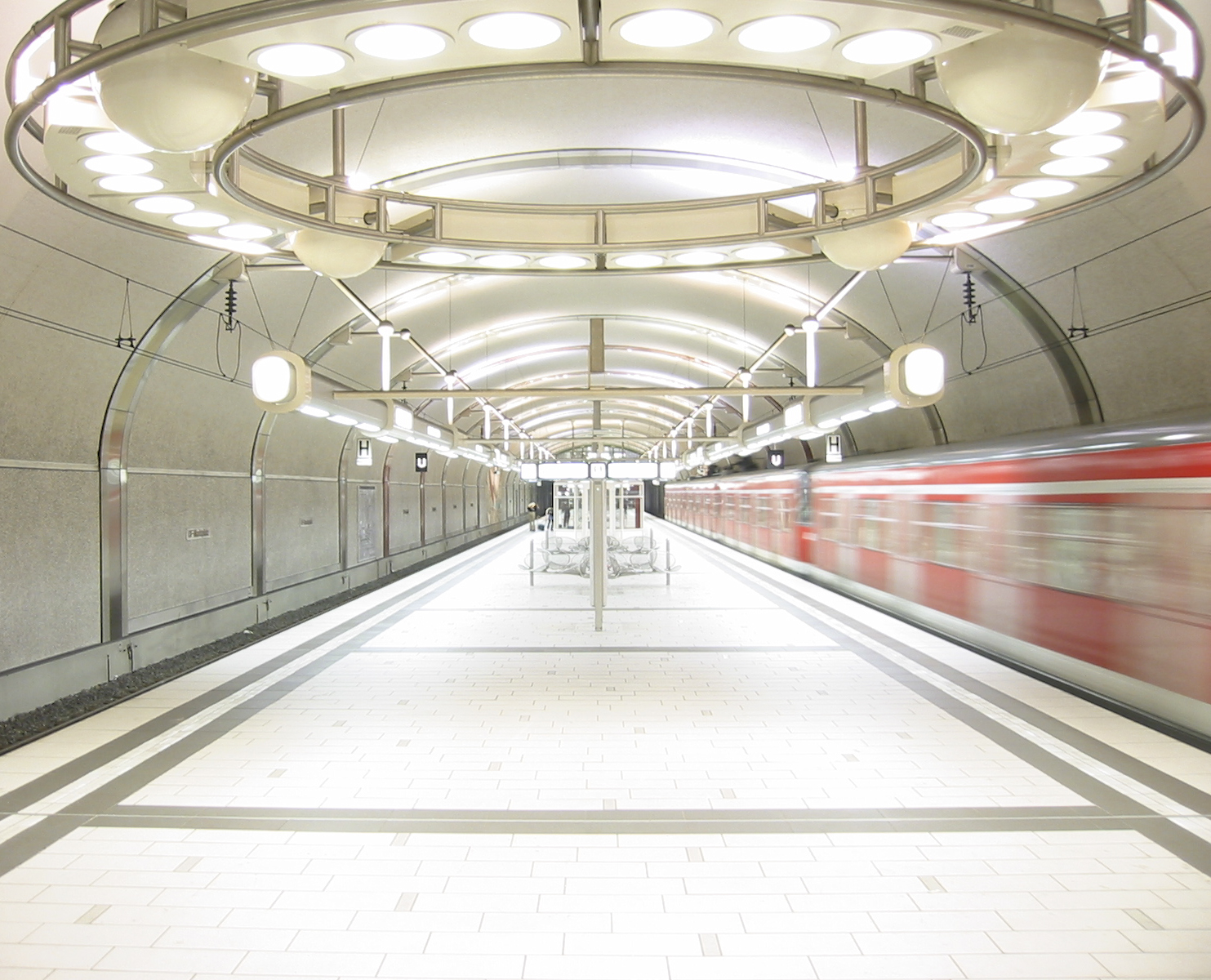
- Offenbach-Marktplatz Station

Overview
- Native name: City-Tunnel Offenbach
- Locale: Hesse, Germany

Technical
- Line length: 3.7 km (2.3 mi)
- Track gauge: 1,435 mm (4 ft 8 1/2 in) standard gauge
- Electrification: 15 kV/16.7 Hz AC overhead catenary
- Operating speed: 80 km/h (49.7 mph) (maximum)
- Maximum incline: 4.0%

The Offenbach City Tunnel is a railway tunnel on the Frankfurt Schlachthof–Hanau railway in Offenbach am Main in the German state of Hesse. It is used by all of the eastern branches of the Rhine-Main S-Bahn (S1, S2, S8 and S9). It runs largely under Berliner Straße.

== Construction ==
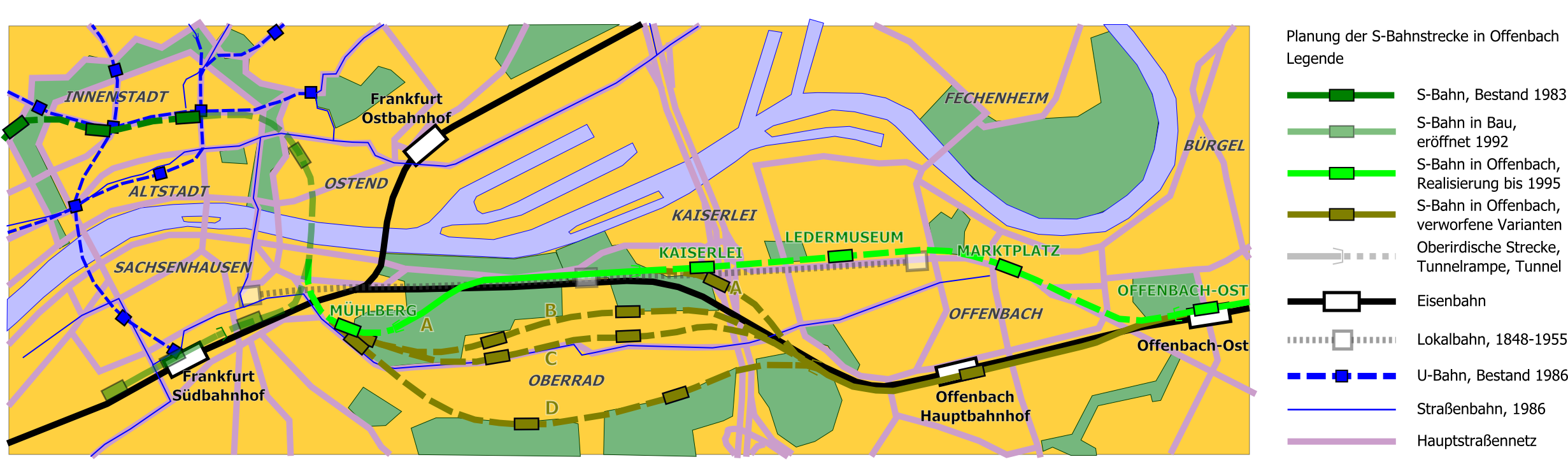
Planning options considered, the most northerly route was chosen

Several options were considered and the current route was selected in 1983. Finance for the project was agreed on 4 December 1986, and planning approval was achieved at the end of 1990, allowing construction to begin. However, the symbolic beginning of construction was on 23 March 1988. Parts of the new line run along or below the route of the former Lokalbahn line.

== Commissioning and subsequent changes ==
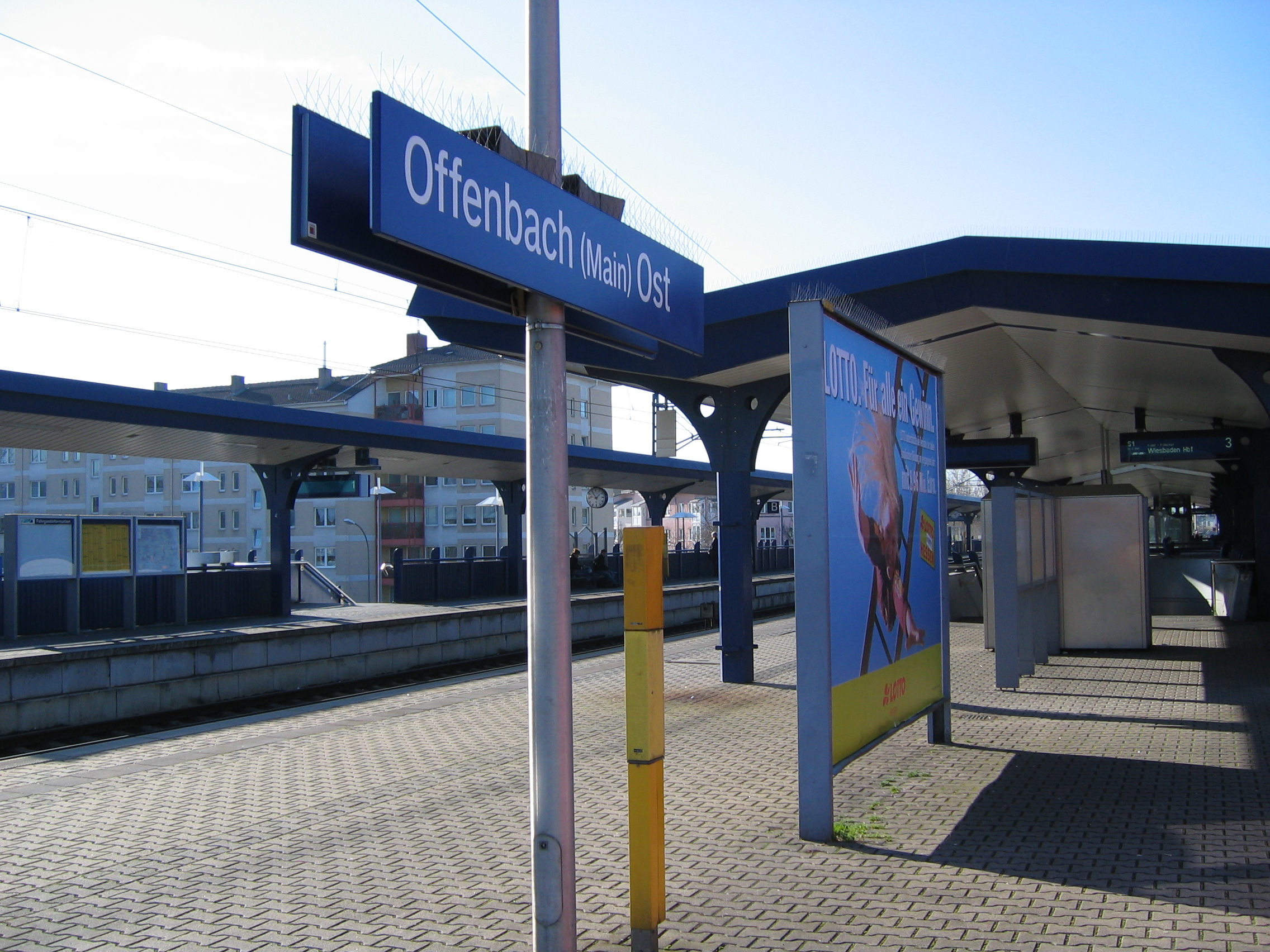
Offenbach Ost station

The line between Frankfurt-Mühlberg and Offenbach Ost was opened on 23 May 1995. This was linked with the extension of line S8 to Hanau, while line S1 only went as far as Offenbach Ost. Line S2—which had previously terminated at Muhlberg—was diverted to Frankfurt South station.

Following the completion of the upgrading of the Rodgau Railway as well as the route to Dietzenbach on 23 March 2001 lines S1, S2, S8 and S9 now run through the Offenbach City Tunnel. Limited capacity in the Frankfurt City Tunnel until 13 June 2010, meant that line S2—in contrast to the other lines—could only run every half-hour, while additional peak hour S2 trains could only operate between Dietzenbach and Offenbach Hauptbahnhof and between Frankfurt Hauptbahnhof and Niedernhausen rather than use the tunnel.

In the course of the Offenbach City Tunnel, S-Bahn trains stop at three stations: Kaiserlei, Ledermuseum (Leather Museum) and Marktplatz. All stations are very similar in construction.

== Notes ==
- Eisenbahnen in der Region Frankfurt RheinMain (Railways in the Frankfurt Rhine-Main region) (in German). Darmstadt: Hestra-Verlag. 2002. ISBN 3-7771-0304-7.
