= Mühlheim (Main) station =

Railway station in Mühlheim am Main, Hesse, Germany

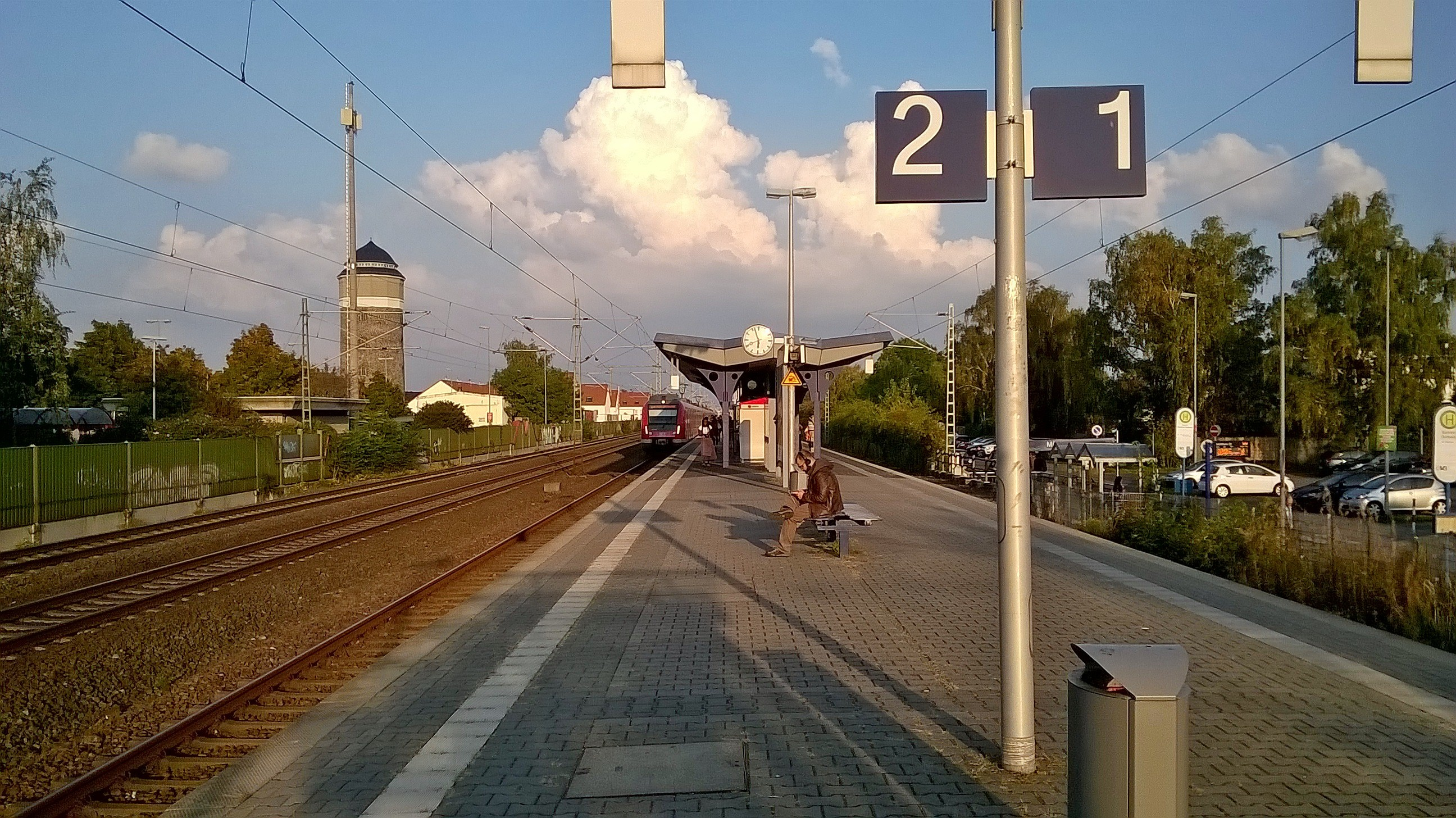
- Mühlheim (Main) station looking east toward Dietesheim and Hanau.

General information
- Location: Mühlheim am Main, Hesse; Germany
- Coordinates: 50°07′08″N 8°50′17″E
- System: S-Bahn station
- Lines: Frankfurt Schlachthof–Hanau railway (km 69.9) (KBS 645.8/9)
- Platforms: 2

Other information
- Station code: 4210
- DS100 code: FMH
- Fare zone: : 3630
- Website: www.bahnhof.de

History
- Opened: c. 1995

Services
Preceding station	Rhine-Main S-Bahn	Following station
Offenbach Ost towards Wiesbaden Hbf	S8 (Rhine-Main S-Bahn)	Mühlheim-Dietesheim towards Hanau Hbf
Offenbach Ost towards Wiesbaden Hbf	S9 (Rhine-Main S-Bahn)	Mühlheim-Dietesheim towards Hanau Hbf
Location

Mühlheim (Main) station is a railway station serving the town of Mühlheim am Main, approximately 11.5 kilometres (7.1 mi) to the east of the city of Frankfurt am Main in Hesse, Germany. It has two tracks on a single island platform, and both are served by S-Bahn lines S8 and S9, which run from Wiesbaden in the west to Hanau in the east via Frankfurt Airport, Frankfurt Hauptbahnhof and the city tunnel, and Offenbach Ost. Trains call approximately every 30 minutes during the day, with more frequent quarter-hourly services during the rush hour. Late in the evenings, early in the mornings, and on Sundays, services are restricted to once per hour in either direction, as other S8 and S9 services terminate at Offenbach Ost instead of Hanau Hbf.

The Frankfurt–Göttingen railway, which was built in 1863, runs past the station, but no train services on this line call here. Mühlheim (Main) was opened in the mid-1990s, following the completion of the Frankfurt Schlachthof–Hanau railway and the expansion of the Rhine-Main S-Bahn network.
