= City Tunnel =

City Tunnell may refer to:

- City Tunnel (Malmö), a railway tunnel in Sweden
- Cross City Tunnel, a road tunnel in Sydney, Australia
- Frankfurt City Tunnel, a railway tunnel in Germany
- Offenbach City Tunnel, a railway tunnel in Germany
- Leipzig City Tunnel, a railway tunnel in Germany
