= Frankfurt–Offenbach Local Railway =

Railway line, operated 1848–1955

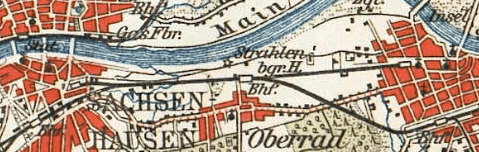
Course of the Frankfurt-Offenbach Lokalbahn and termini in Sachsenhausen and Offenbach.

The Frankfurt-Offenbach local railway (German: Frankfurt-Offenbacher Lokalbahn) was a former railway in the Frankfurt am Main area, which developed from the state-owned Frankfurt-Offenbach Railway (Frankfurt-Offenbacher Eisenbahn). The line opened in 1848 and was one of the oldest railways in Germany. It was the first railway line between the Frankfurt and the nearby city of Offenbach and operated until 1955.

== Planning and building ==
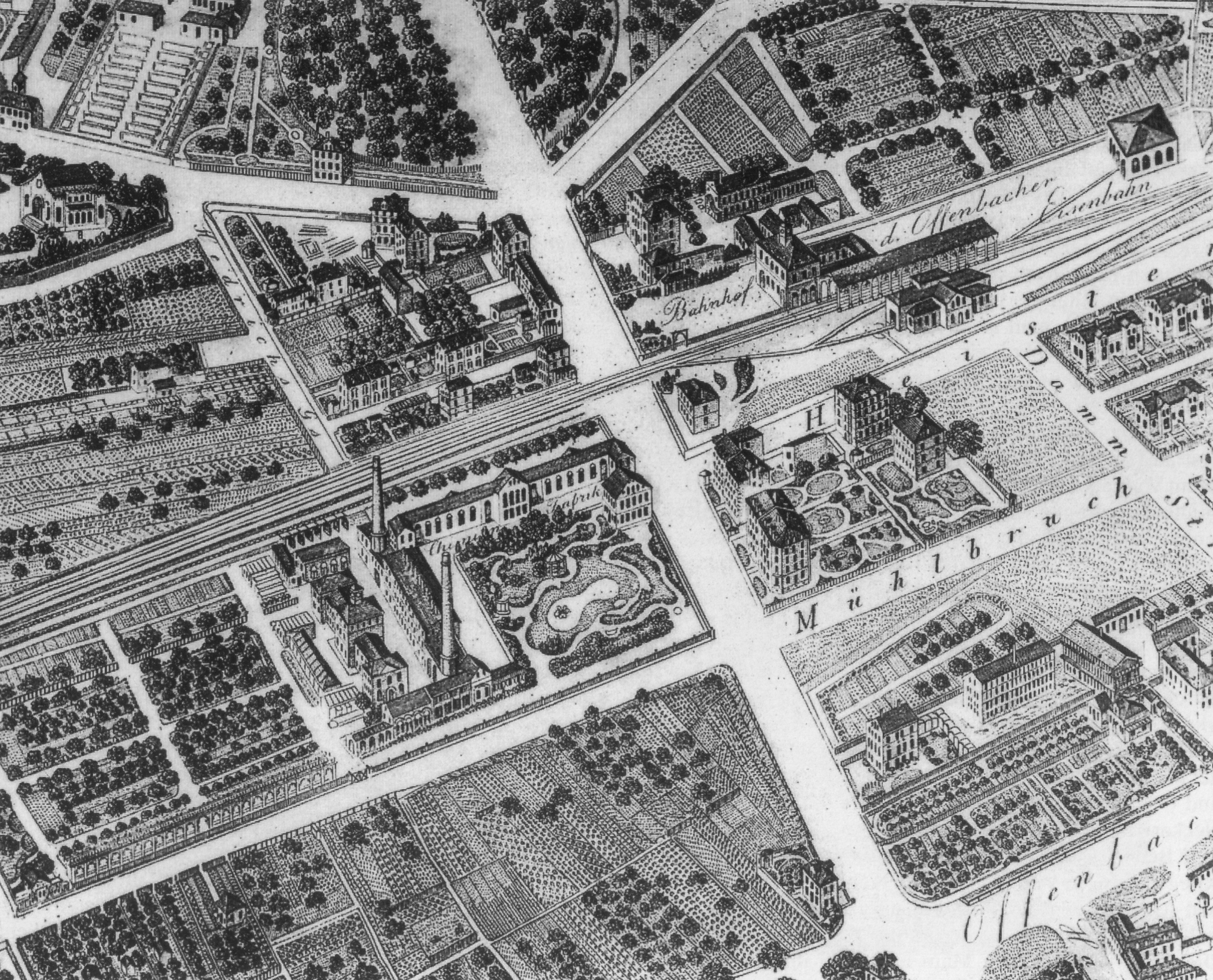
Old Sachsenhausen station in 1864

While the Grand Duchy of Hesse (Hesse-Darmstadt) was developing plans for the construction of the Main-Neckar Railway (connecting Frankfurt and Heidelberg), a local company proposed in the late 1830s to build a line along the south bank of the Main, connecting the line with Offenbach, one of the most important commercial cities of the Grand Duchy. The project failed in 1841 for lack of funds.

The Free City of Frankfurt had misgivings about a connection between Darmstadt and Offenbach, but it supported a rail connection between Frankfurt and Offenbach. The Grand Duchy and the Free City of Frankfurt signed an agreement on 12 December 1842 to establish a joint state railway company, known as a condominium railway (Kondominalbahn) and to construct the line. This would connect with the Main-Neckar Railway, construction of which was about to start.

The terminus of the line was in Offenbach on a plot of land northwest of the centre of the city at that time. This area was west of Kaiserstraße between Domstraße and Bahnhofstraße (streets). The station—later called Lokalbahnhof—was built on the eastern edge of Sachsenhausen between Darmstädter Landstraße, Heisterstraße and Dreieichstraße and was originally called Sachsenhausen station, later Old Sachsenhausen station. Stations were also built north of Oberrad and at the current street of Wasserhofstraße.

== Operations ==
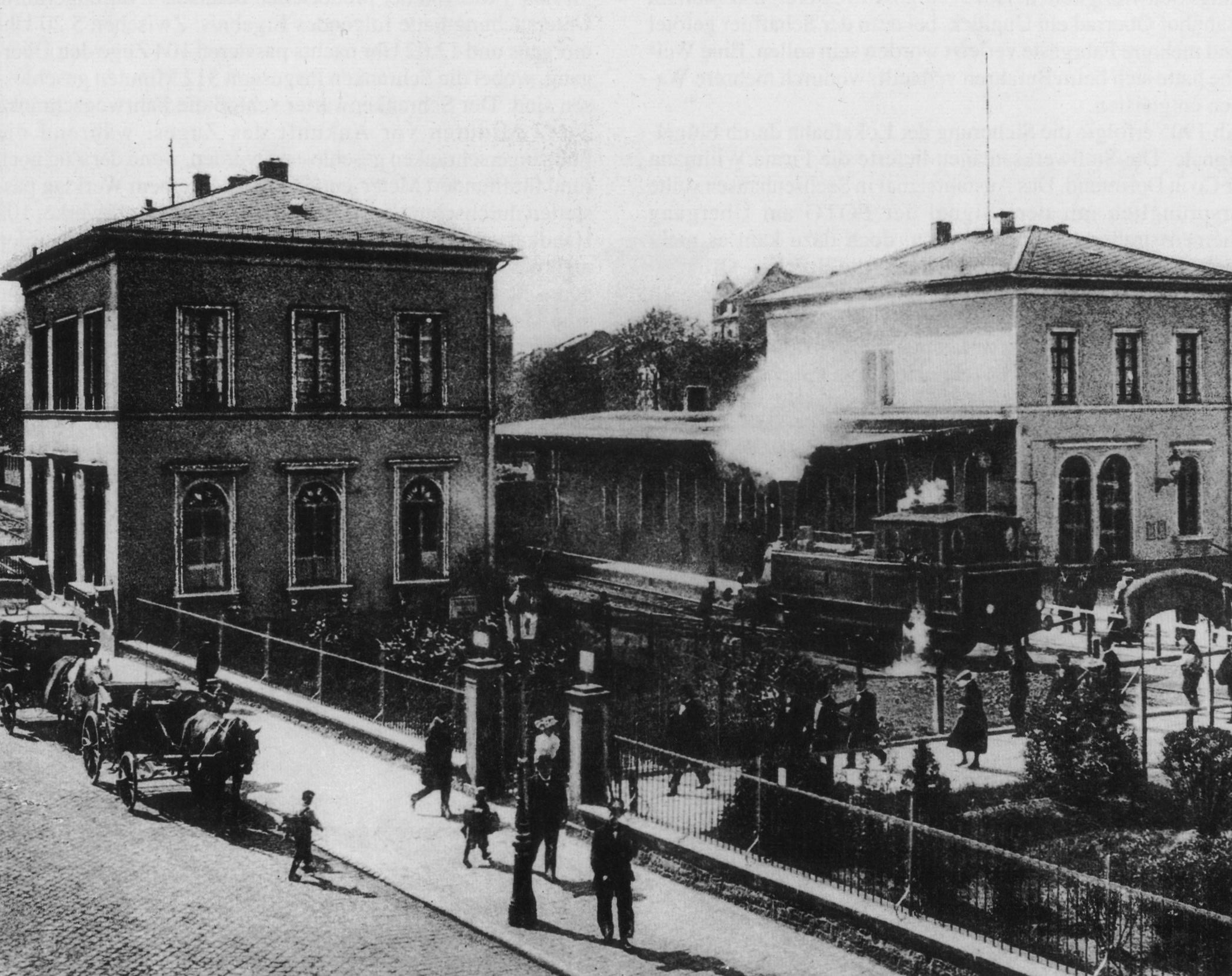
Offenbacher Lokalbahn station

Difficulties in acquiring land north of Oberrad and the opposition of carters in Frankfurt delayed the start of operations. The originally planned commencement of services on 1 August 1846, simultaneously with the opening of the Main-Neckar railway, was not achieved. Services also did not start on 1 August 1847, despite the completion of railway facilities. Instead, freight trains ran only three times a week at night from 23 August, operating in what had been declared publicly as a trial.

Since the first Main-Neckar Railway bridge over the Main had not yet been completed, trains could not reach the Main-Neckar station on the north bank of the Main. Therefore, trains ran from Darmstadt to an operations depot called Mainspitze on the edge of the Main, where they reversed to run back to Sachsenhausen station, which had been rented as a temporary terminus from the Frankfurt-Offenbach Railway. The Main-Neckar Railway wanted sole use of the Sachsenhausen station and was not interested in joint operations with the Frankfurt-Offenbach Railway, creating further delays.

Another reason for the delay was that the Frankfurt-Offenbach Railway had leased its two locomotives to the Main-Neckar Railway, which used them on the Mannheim–Friedrichsfeld line. The company used a Main-Neckar Railway locomotive to haul its night freight trains to and from Offenbach.

The people of Offenbach demanded that passenger service operation commence during the March Revolution of 1848. On 8 March, a crowd assembled in the station area and demanded to be taken to Sachsenhausen and on to Darmstadt. There they wanted to hold a demonstration to put pressure on the government and parliament. The railway staff accepted the demand and made a passenger train ready.

The management of the Frankfurt-Offenbach Railway gave in to public pressure and provided a regular passenger service. Since both of its rented locomotives were still needed, it temporarily hired two engines and staff from the Main-Neckar Railway, prior to the return of its own engines from Mannheim. From 9 March 1848 four pairs of trains ran each day between Offenbach and Sachsenhausen according to a temporary timetable. Official services started on 16 April 1848 with ten pairs of trains operating each day, with eleven trains in both directions on Sundays and public holidays.

On 15 November 1848 the Main-Neckar Bridge and the associated north bank station of the Main-Neckar Railway opened in Frankfurt. The Frankfurt-Offenbach Railway now had sole operating rights in Sachsenhausen station. Through trains to Frankfurt Main-Neckar station were planned, but only operated from 18 October 1849 because of a dispute over track charges. Some trains still terminated in Sachsenhausen due to lack of demand. According to the timetable of 1865, eight trains ran daily from Offenbach to Frankfurt; only five stopped short at Sachsenhausen.

== Further developments ==
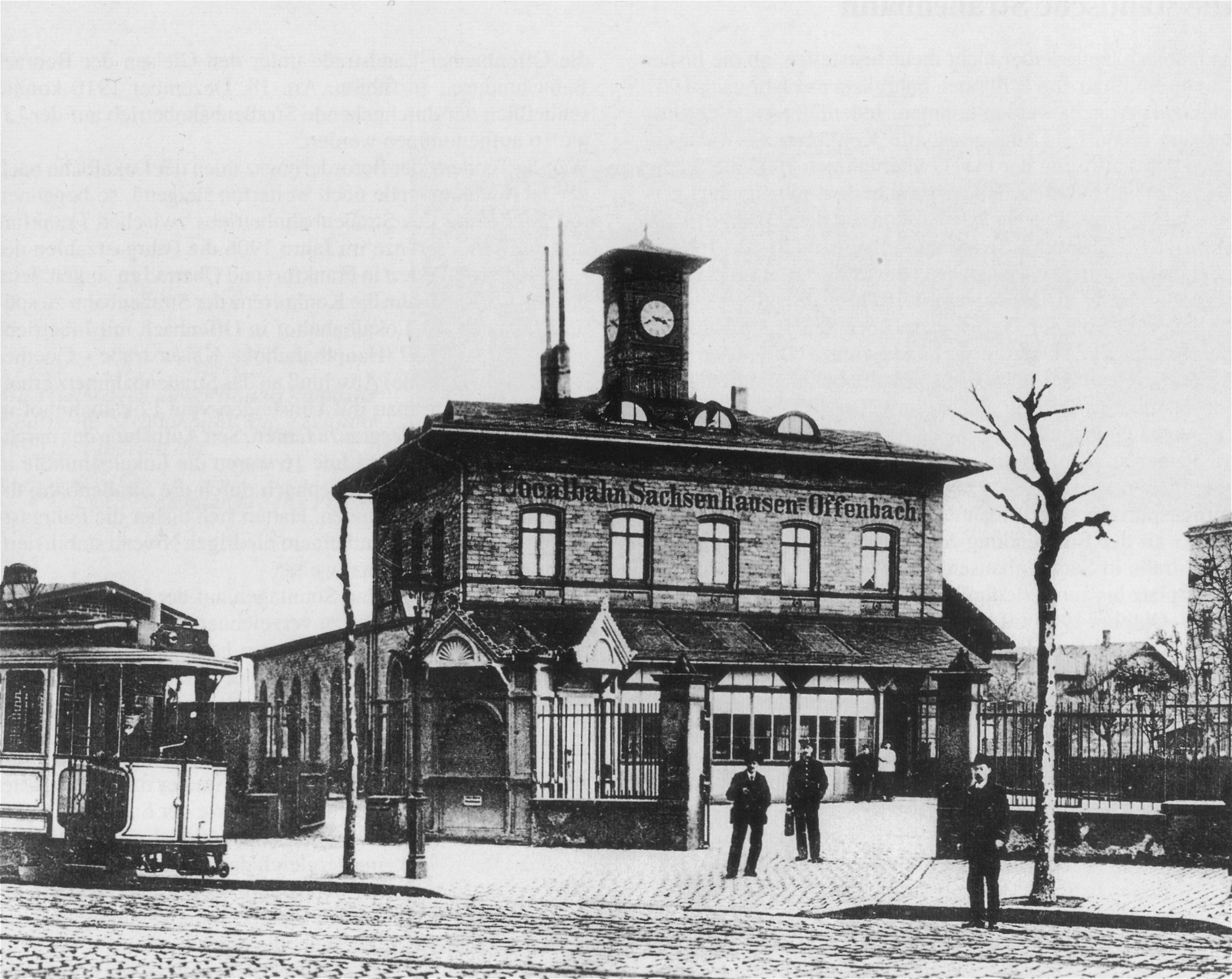
Frankfurt Lokalbahn station in 1900

With the annexation of Frankfurt by Prussia after the Austro-Prussian War of 1866, Frankfurt's share of the Frankfurt-Offenbach Railway was taken over by Prussia. On 31 December 1871, Prussia became a party to the treaty with Hesse-Darmstadt, retrospectively to 12 June 1868, and it became part of the Prussian State Railways.

The construction of the Frankfurt–Bebra railway from Hanau to Frankfurt via Offenbach significantly increased the importance of the line. On 16 November 1873, a new line was opened from the existing line of the former Frankfurt-Offenbach Railway in Oberrad to connect the line to the Main-Neckar Railway station in Frankfurt. As early as 1874 two more tracks were laid in order to cope with the increased traffic. On 2 December 1875, Bebraer station (Bebraer Bahnhof) in Frankfurt (now called South station) was finally opened southwest of the old Sachsenhausen station. At the same time the previous connection to the Main-Neckar bridge was abandoned and removed. The former Frankfurt-Offenbach Railway line became the Lokalbahn (Local Railway) and now operated only as a shuttle service between Offenbach and Frankfurt Localbahn station (Lokalbahnhof), as it was now renamed.

In 1881 Frankfurt Lokalbahn station was connected to the network of the Frankfurter Trambahn-Gesellschaft, the Frankfurt tram company. From 1884 the Lokalbahn was affected seriously by competition from the Frankfurt-Offenbach Tramway Company (Frankfurt-Offenbacher Trambahn-Gesellschaft, FOTG), the first electric tramway in Germany and the fourth in the world. Although the Lokalbahn offered lower fares and faster journey times, the tram ran to the centre of Offenbach and Oberrad. Patronage on the Lokalbahn fell from 1,601,826 in 1883 to 1,405,519 persons in 1884, while the FOTG had 440,000 passengers in its first year. The Frankfurt Forest Railway (Frankfurter Waldbahn), a steam tramway, had used the Lokalbahnhof as its terminus since 6 February 1889.

From 1885, the Lokalbahn carried a significant volume of goods for the first time: the Sachsenhausen slaughterhouse was connected by a siding to Frankfurt Lokalbahn station and had its own "cattle yard" station, which handled cattle shipments. In 1900, however, the siding was replaced with a branch off the Bebra Railway at Oberrad, ending the transport of goods on the Lokalbahn.

A serious decline in the number of passengers came in 1906 with the integration of the former FOTG line to Offenbach into the Frankfurt tram network, allowing a direct service from Offenbach to central Frankfurt. As a consequence, the number of passengers on the Lokalbahn was reduced by a quarter, while the aging infrastructure of the railway had an increasing impact on costs. The line made its first major losses, so the Prussian State Railways contemplating a sale of the line to the cities of Frankfurt and Offenbach. These were planning the electrification and modernisation of the line and a connection to Frankfurt South or Hauptbahnhof. At times, the conversion of the line into an electric underground railway was planned according to the Berlin model. The outbreak of the First World War in 1914, however, prevented the implementation of these plans. In the summer 1914 timetable, trains ran from Frankfurt to Offenbach at twenty-minute intervals from 5.40 to midnight.

Like the Wars of 1866 and 1870/71, the First World War also affected operation of the Lokalbahn considerably. Passenger numbers halved and coal and spare parts shortage repeatedly closed the line. The timetable was thinned until 1918, when it was completely closed. In 1920, Monday to Saturday trains recommenced at 40-minute intervals. After an attempt to close the line in 1921, which was abandoned after protests from local residents, operations were limited from 1925 to 6 to 9 AM and 4 to 8 PM on Monday to Saturday and 1 to 8 PM on Sundays and public holidays. Luggage and parcel services were abandoned and staff reduced to a minimum.

The Second World War affected rail service only slightly at first. Early in 1942 the schedule was temporarily reduced to hourly operations, but in November the same year trains were running every half-hour. In January and March 1944, allied bombing raids at times disrupted the track and destroyed the station building in Frankfurt, but operations resumed after a few days each time. The war finally closed operations on 28 August 1944.

Damage to the Lokalbahn was repaired and the line was put back into operation on 2 December 1946. A four-axle diesel engine of class VT 60.5 was used to haul services instead of the steam trains formerly used. Services ran every half-hour from the 1947/48 winter timetable.

== Closure ==
Some time after the currency reform of 1948, increasing motorisation and an improved rail service on the Bebra line led to the number of passengers quickly falling to about 1000 per day. Deutsche Bundesbahn (German Federal Railways) therefore decided to close the now highly unprofitable line on 1 October 1955. During the last three days of operations, travel on the trains was free.

With the exception of Oberrad station, all rail track was isolated and building abandoned on the Lokalbahn in the summer of 1956. A new tram station and an office building were built on the site of Frankfurt Lokalbahn station in 1970. In 1990, an S-Bahn station of the same name opened south of the former Lokalbahn station.

Parts of the former Lokalbahn line were used in 1989 for the construction of the S-Bahn line to Offenbach am Main, which went into operation in 1995. In Offenbach, the Offenbach City Tunnel runs below the route of the former Lokalbahn line.
