= West station =

West station can refer to:

== Australia ==
- City West railway station, Perth
- Concord West railway station
- Cootamundra West railway station
- Euabalong West railway station
- Maryborough West railway station
- West Leederville railway station
- West Richmond railway station

== Austria ==
- Innsbruck Westbahnhof
- Villach Westbahnhof
- Wien Westbahnhof railway station

== Belgium ==
- Brussels-West station
- Charleroi-West railway station

== Canada ==
- Montréal-Ouest station

== Denmark ==
- Varde Vest Station, Varde

== France ==
- Gare Montparnasse, once station of the Chemins de fer de l'Ouest

== Germany ==
- Aachen West station
- Eisenach West station
- Frankfurt West station
- Gevelsberg West station
- Tübingen West station

== Hungary ==
- Budapest Nyugati station

== Netherlands ==
- Veenendaal West railway station

== North Korea ==
- Sopyongyang station (West P'yŏngyang station)

== People's Republic of China ==
- Beijing West railway station

== Sweden ==
- Malmö West Station (Malmö Västra)
- Östersund Västra Train Station, Östersund
- Sundsvalls västra station, Stenstan

== Switzerland ==
- Aareschlucht West railway station
- Brienz West railway station
- Chur West railway station
- Interlaken West railway station
- Solothurn West railway station (Westbahnhof)

== United Kingdom ==
- West Acton tube station, London
- Allens West railway station
- Bangor West railway station
- West Brompton station
- Canterbury West railway station
- West Croydon railway station
- Dorchester West railway station
- Dorking West railway station
- West Dulwich railway station
- West Ealing railway station
- Ewell West railway station
- West Finchley tube station, London
- Folkestone West railway station
- Greenock West railway station
- Hamilton West railway station
- West Harrow tube station, London
- Hillington West railway station
- Hounslow West tube station, London
- West Kensington tube station, London
- Kentish Town West railway station, London
- Maidstone West railway station
- Oakwood tube station, formerly known as Enfield West
- Penge West railway station, London
- Pollokshaws West railway station
- Pollokshields West railway station
- Reading West railway station
- Tunbridge Wells West railway station
- Watford West railway station
- West Ruislip station, London
- West Sutton railway station, London
- West Worthing railway station

== United States ==
- West Acton station (MBTA)
- West Baltimore station
- West Barnstable station
- Boston University West station
- Chestnut Hill West station
- Corona–West station
- West Concord station
- West Glacier station
- West Gloucester station
- West Haven station
- West Hingham station
- West Medford station
- Mount Vernon West station
- West Natick station
- West Newton station
- West Palm Beach station
- West Roxbury station
- West Station (MBTA)
- West Trenton station

== See also ==
- Western station (disambiguation)
- East Station (disambiguation)
- North Station (disambiguation)
- South Station (disambiguation)
