= Gare de l'Est (disambiguation) =

Gare de l'Est (French: Train Station of the East) is a surface rail train station in Paris, France.

Gare de l'Est may also refer to:

- Gare de l'Est, Kinshasa, Democratic Republic of the Congo; a train station
- Gare de l'Est (Paris Metro), Paris, France; a subway station

== See also ==
- Train de l'Est (French: Train of the East, East Island Train), Montreal, Quebec, Canada; a commuter rail line
- REM de l'Est (French: East Island REM), Montreal, Quebec, Canada; a proposed rapid transit elevated rail line
- Train de Chemins de fer de l'Est (French: Trains of the Railway of the East); see List of Chemins de fer de l'Est locomotives
- Chemins de fer de l'Est (French: Railroad of the East), a rail network and railway company in France
- East Station (disambiguation)
- East (disambiguation)
- Est (disambiguation)
