= Steinheim (Main) station =

Railway station in Hanau, Germany

Steinheim/Main
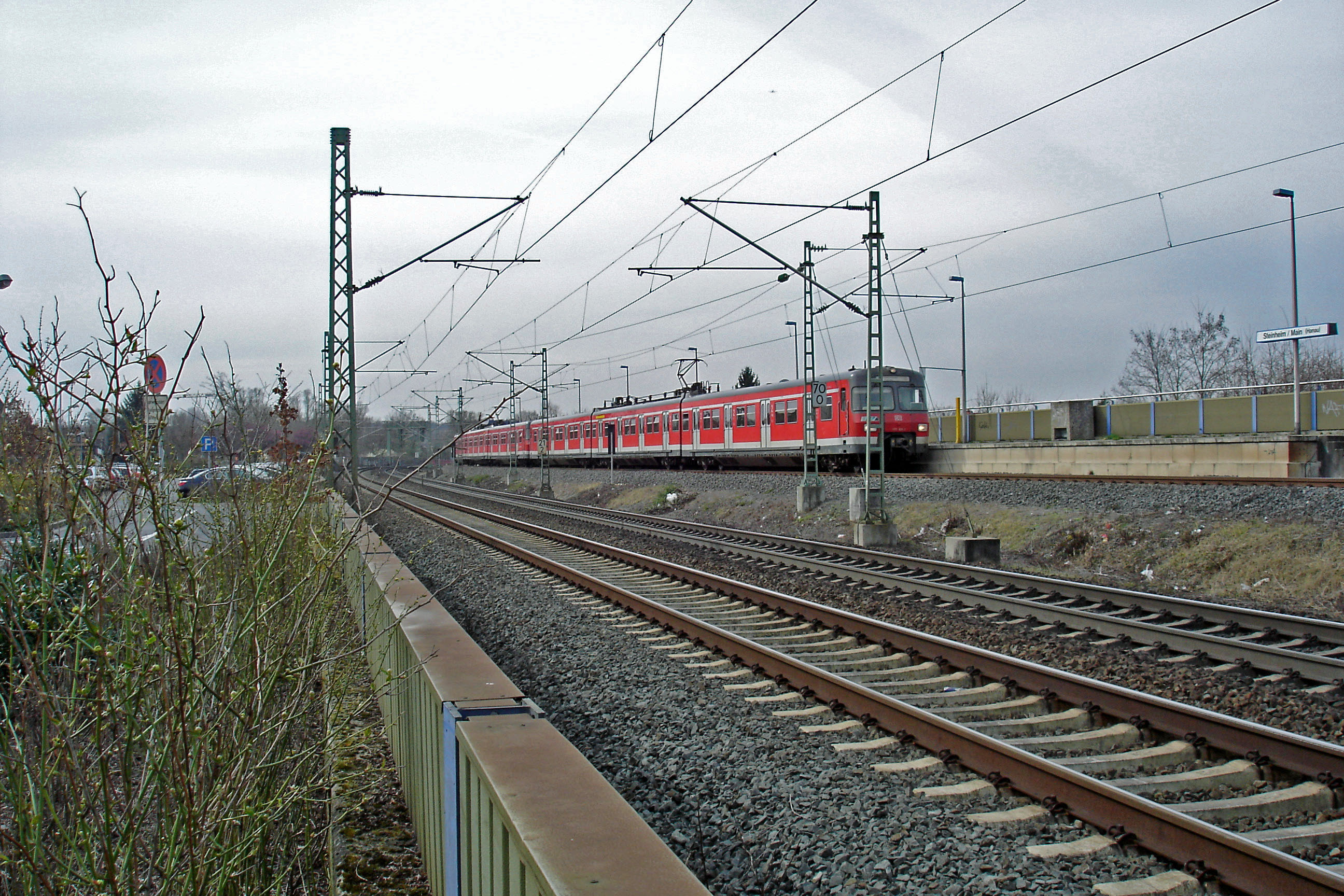

General information
- Location: Hanau, Hesse; Germany
- Coordinates: 50°07′17″N 8°54′24″E
- Lines: Frankfurt Schlachthof–Hanau railway (km 69.9) (KBS 645.8/9)
- Platforms: 1

Construction
- Accessible: Yes

Other information
- Station code: 5998
- DS100 code: FSHM
- IBNR: 8005706
- Category: 5
- Fare zone: : 3001
- Website: www.bahnhof.de

History
- Opened: 1995

Services
| Preceding station | Rhine-Main S-Bahn | Following station |
|---|---|---|
| Mühlheim-Dietesheim towards Wiesbaden Hbf | S8 (Rhine-Main S-Bahn) | Hanau Hbf Terminus |
| Mühlheim-Dietesheim towards Wiesbaden Hbf | S9 (Rhine-Main S-Bahn) | Hanau Hbf Terminus |
Location

Steinheim (Main) station is a station on the Frankfurt Schlachthof–Hanau railway in Hanau in the German state of Hesse. The station is classified by Deutsche Bahn (DB) as a category 5 station.

== Location and description ==
The station is located on the Frankfurt Schlachthof–Hanau S-Bahn line between Frankfurt and Hanau, which runs parallel with a section of the Frankfurt–Göttingen railway (DB line no. 3600). The S-Bahn line is single track here, as it is all the way from Mülheim (Main) Dietenheim station to Hanau Central Station (German: Hanau Hauptbahnhof).The single platform is on the northeast side of the track and is served by trains in both directions. The platform is located on the side of the track away from central Steinheim. This is a somewhat unusual arrangement made necessary because the S-Bahn track runs on the northern side of the line in order to cross Steinheim Main Bridge and to connect immediately afterwards to the tracks on the northern side of Hanau station. The station was brought into operation with the opening of the S-Bahn in 1995, and it is served by lines S8 and S9.

== History ==
It replaces the previous Steinheim (Kr. Offenbach) station, which was at the same place on the Frankfurt–Bebra railway and opened in 1873. Its original name was Klein Steinheim. The station building was, however, on the southeast side of the tracks. The railway also had a freight track with a goods shed for local freight.

The station served the former municipality of Steinheim (Kr Offenbach), which was absorbed into the city of Hanau in 1974 as part of the Hessian municipal reform. Owing to various constraints on the route of the Frankfurt–Bebra railway, such as the location of the bridge over the Main and the junction with the north bank line of the Frankfurt-Hanau Railway Company (Frankfurt-Hanauer Eisenbahn Gesellschaft, FHE) in Hanau Central Station (then called Hanau Ost (east)), Steinheim station was established quite far from the centres of Steinheim, Klein-Steinheim and Niedersteinheim (0.5 km) and of Obersteinheim and Groß-Steinheim (1.8 km), which meant that traffic was quickly lost to private cars.

The station was closed in several steps: first, in the early 1970s the top floor and the first floor of the entrance building were removed, leaving the mutilated torso of the building with a flat roof. Freight traffic was abandoned. During the construction of the S-Bahn, the station building was finally abandoned and demolished to be replaced by a park and ride car park.

== Services ==
The station is served by S-Bahn lines S8 and S9, both running between Wiesbaden–Hanau, although only line S8 runs via Mainz.
