= Western station =

Western station or Western Avenue station may refer to:

== Chicago, Illinois ==
- Western station (CTA Blue Line Forest Park branch), an "L" station
- Western station (CTA Blue Line O'Hare branch), an "L" station
- Western station (CTA Brown Line), an "L" station
- Western station (CTA Orange Line), an "L" station
- Western station (CTA Pink Line), an "L" station
- Western Avenue station (Milwaukee District), a commuter rail station
- Western Avenue station (BNSF Railway), a commuter rail station

== Los Angeles, California ==
- Hollywood/Western station, a subway station on the B Line
- Wilshire/Western station, a subway station on the D Line
- Expo/Western station, a light rail station on the E Line

== Elsewhere ==
- Western Avenue station (Metro Transit), a light rail station in Saint Paul, Minnesota
- Western Springs station, a commuter rail station in Western Springs, Illinois
- Frankfurt western stations

== See also ==
- Western (disambiguation)
- Western Avenue (disambiguation)
- West station (disambiguation)
