= S8 (Rhine-Main S-Bahn) =

Line of the Rhine-Main S-Bahn

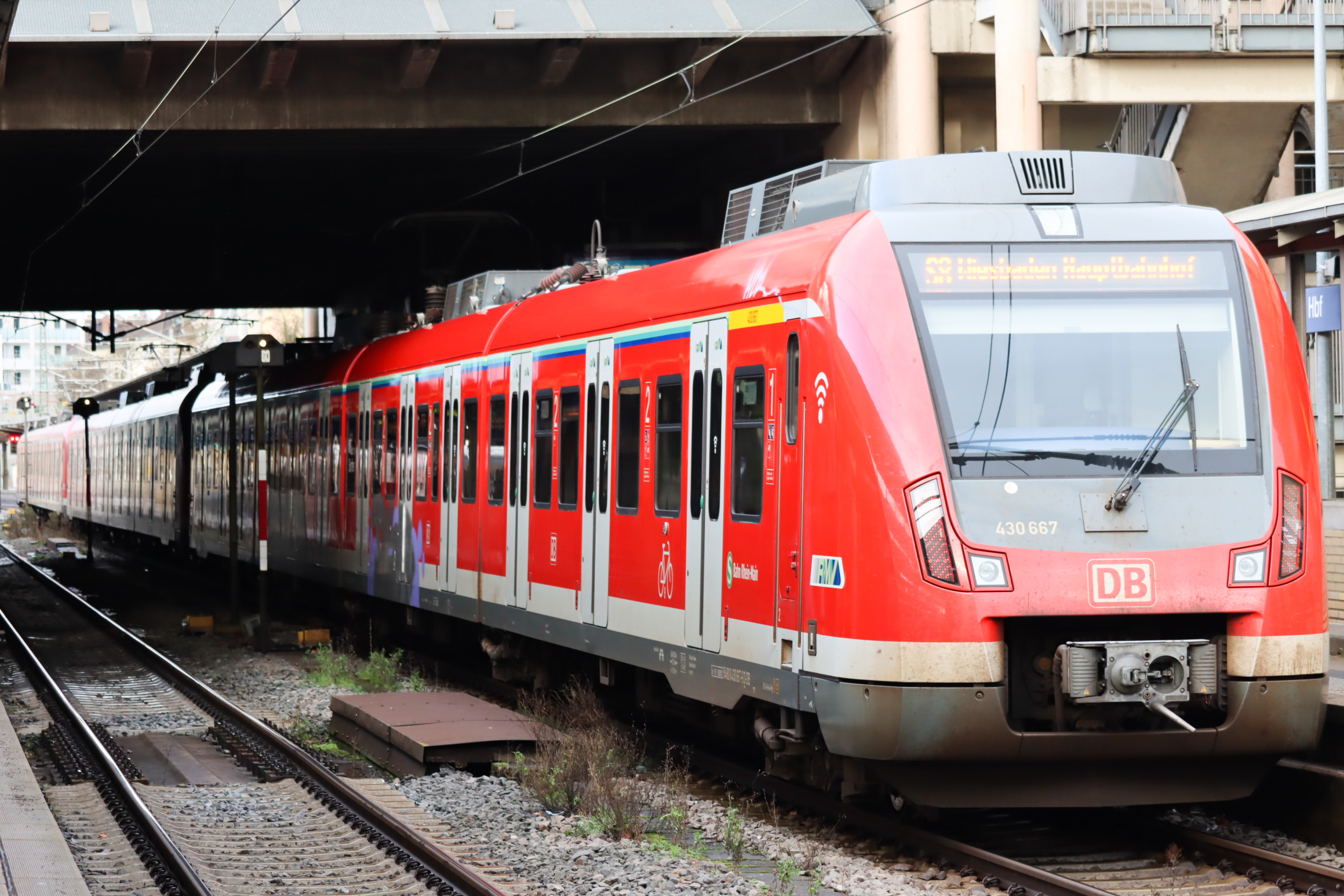
- S8 towards Wiesbaden at Mainz Hauptbahnhof

Overview
- Service type: Rapid transit, Commuter rail
- System: S-Bahn Rhein-Main
- Status: Operational
- Locale: Frankfurt Rhine-Main
- Predecessor: S14, S15
- First service: 1995
- Current operator: DB Regio

Route
- Termini: Wiesbaden Hauptbahnhof; Hanau Hauptbahnhof
- Stops: 29
- Distance travelled: 70.3 km
- Lines used: Main Railway, Citytunnel Frankfurt, Frankfurt Schlachthof–Hanau railway

Technical
- Rolling stock: DBAG Class 430, DBAG Class 425 (On supplementary services from Frankfurt Hauptbahnhof to Kelsterbach)
- Track gauge: 1,435 mm (4 ft 8 1/2 in) standard gauge
- Electrification: Overhead line
- Depot: Frankfurt Hbf
- Timetable number: 645.8

The S8 service of the S-Bahn Rhein-Main system bearing the KBS (German scheduled railway route) number 645.8. It is largely concurrent with the S9 service, diverging only to run local through Mainz (which the S9 bypasses). It runs 24 hours, 7 days and serves as a direct airport rail link for the state capitals of Wiesbaden and Mainz to the Frankfurt Airport.

== Routes ==
=== City tunnel ===
The city tunnel is an underground, pure S-Bahn route used by almost all services (except for the S7 service which terminates at the central station). In a short section between Mühlberg and Offenbach-Kaiserlei a line parallel with the South Main railway is used.

== History ==
Year	Stations	Route
1974 (R14)	15	Wiesbaden Hbf – Frankfurt Hbf
1983 (S14)	18 (+3)	Wiesbaden Hbf – Konstablerwache
1990 (S14)	21 (+3)	Wiesbaden Hbf – Frankfurt Süd
1995	28 (+9, -2)	Wiesbaden Hbf – Hanau Hbf

In 1972 the Frankfurt Airport loop, a new line to connect the recently built Terminal Mitte (Central Terminal) at the Frankfurt Airport to the Central Station and the Main railway, became operational. Two years later the R14 experimental service running between Wiesbaden Central Station and Frankfurt Central Station started. After the opening of the Frankfurt Citytunnel the service was renamed to S14 and extended to the new Hauptwache underground station. In 1980 the new shuttle service S15 running between the Airport station and Frankfurt Central Station started operation. Further extensions of the tunnel followed in 1983 (Konstablerwache) and 1990 (Ostendstraße and Lokalbahnhof) so that the Südbahnhof (South station) became the S14's eastern terminal. In 1995 both services S14 and S15 were renamed to S8 and extended their operation to the east connecting the Central Station of Hanau. Like the S1 the S8 now also used the eastern branch of the Frankfurt Citytunnel as well as the Offenbach Citytunnel.

In 1990 two S14 trainsets collided near the Rüsselsheim station killing 17 and injuring 145 passengers. The conductor of the train bound for Frankfurt ignored the stop signal and crashed into an oncoming, fully occupied train.

== Operation ==
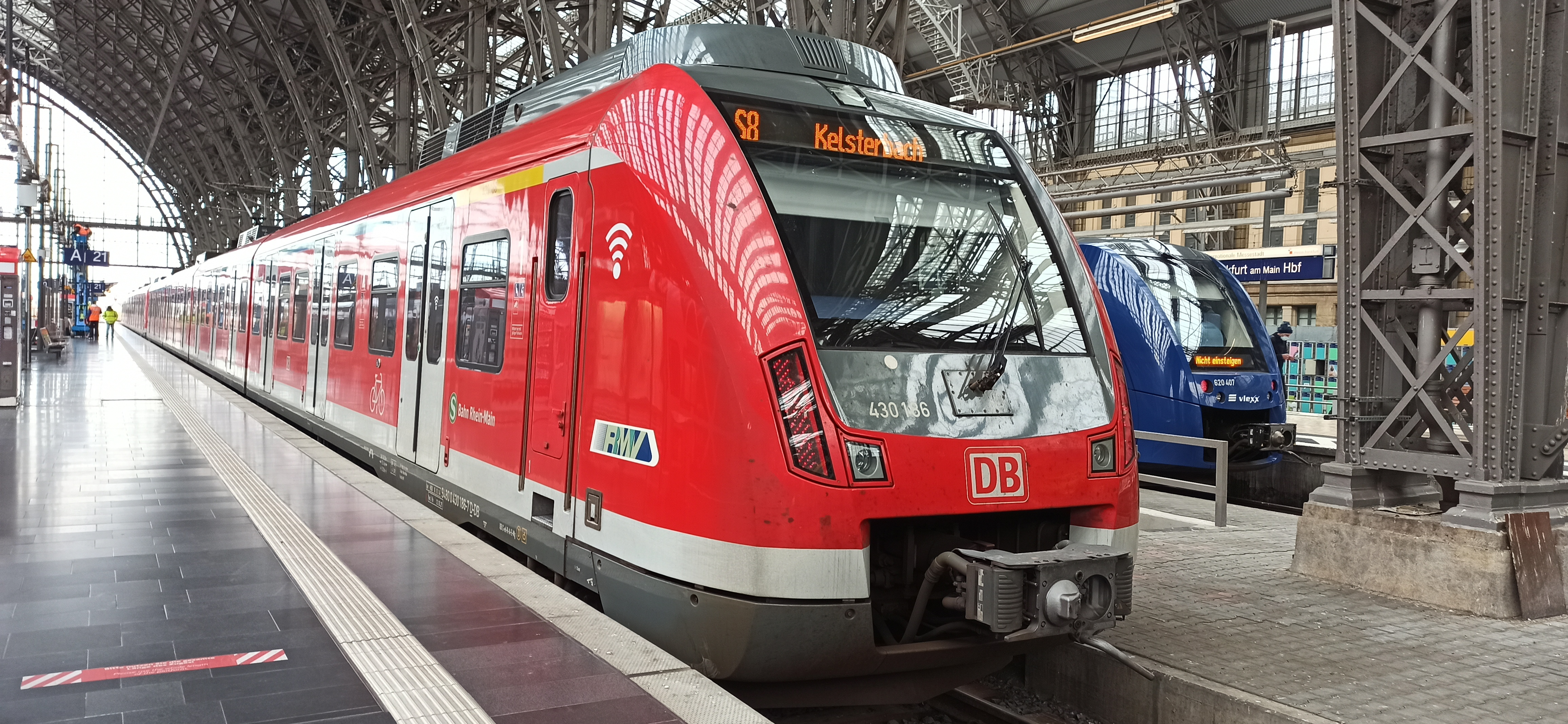
S8 at Frankfurt Hbf towards Kelsterbach

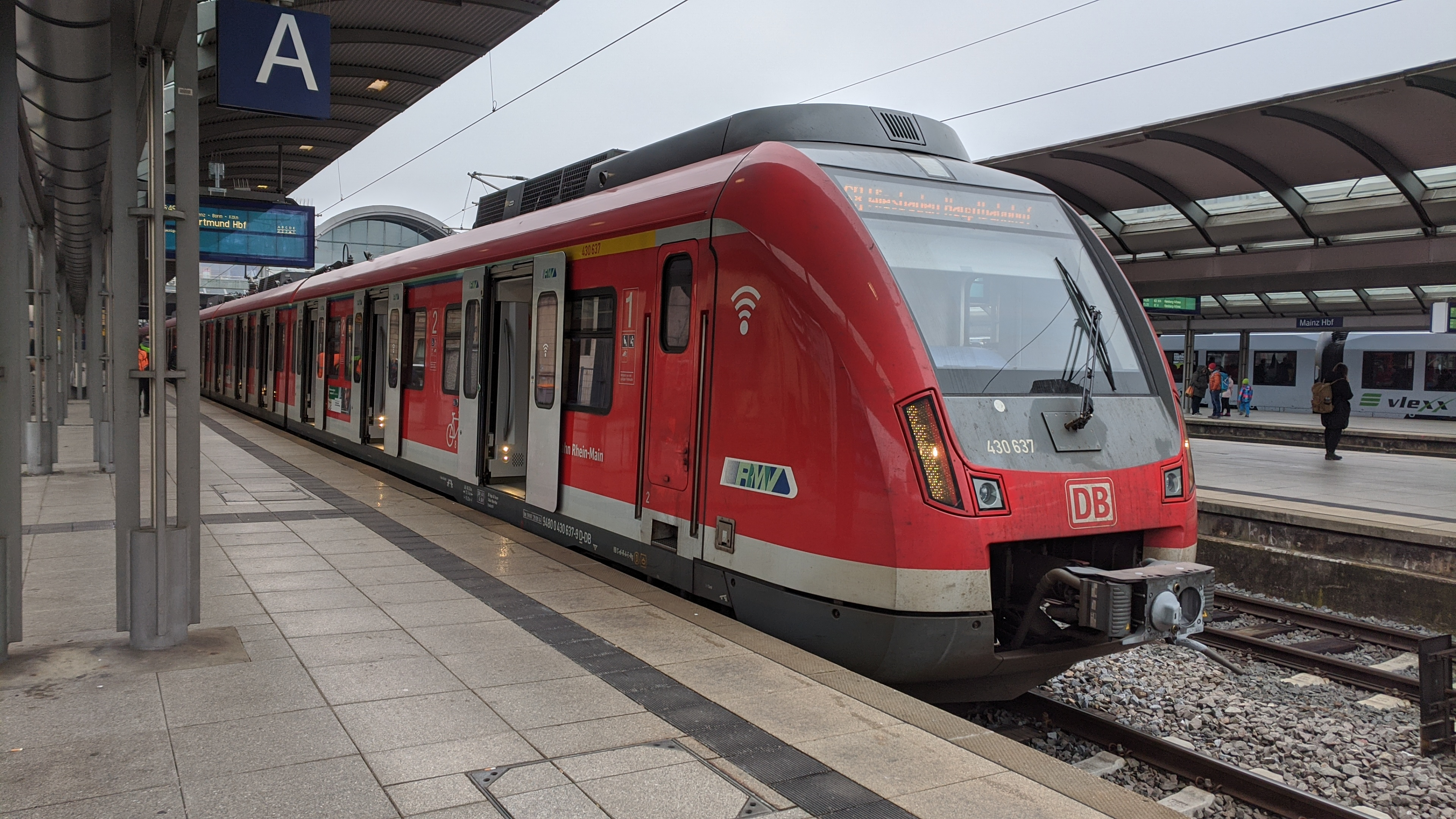
S8 at Mainz Hbf towards Wiesbaden Hbf

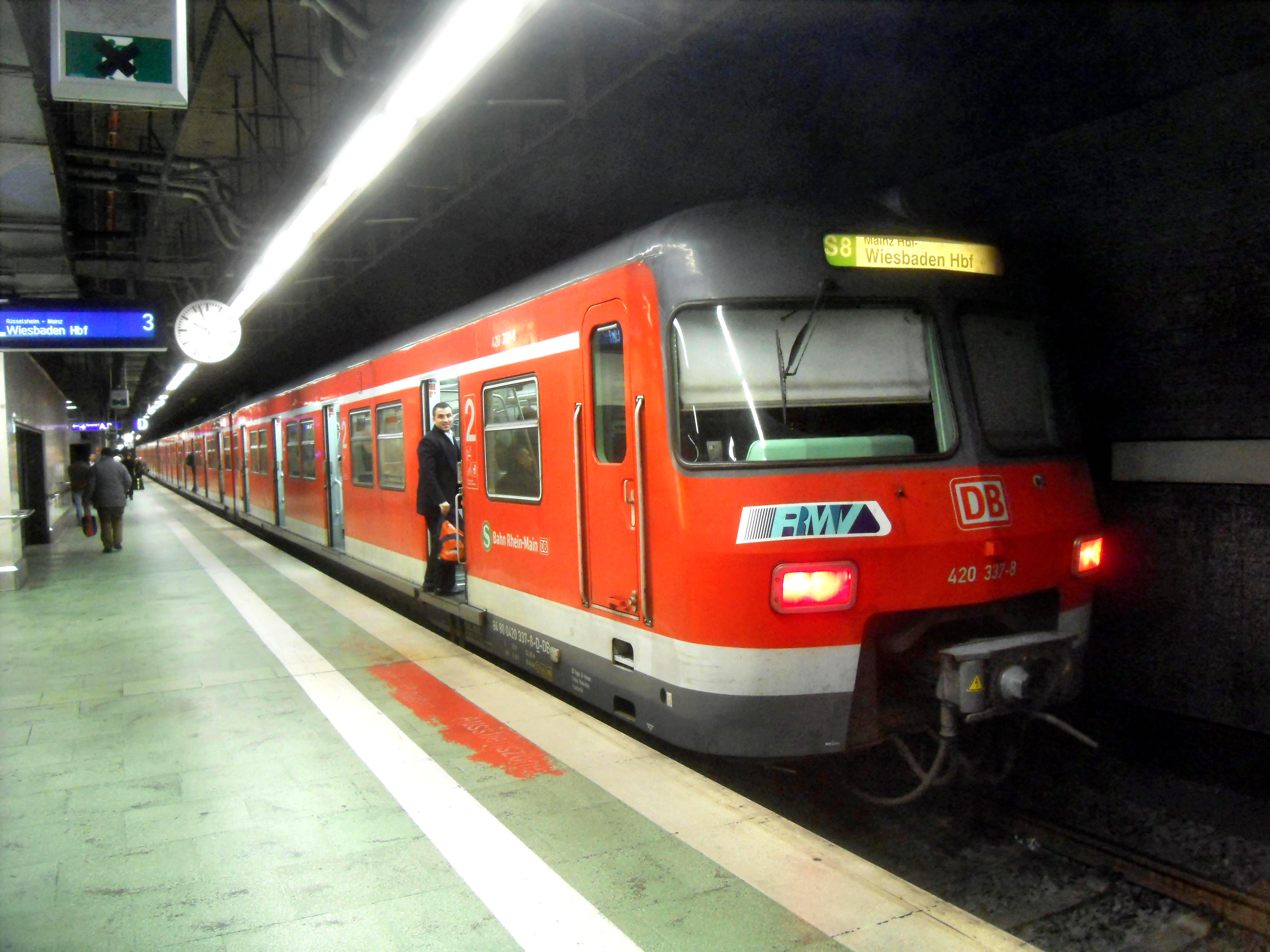
S8 at the airport station, bound for Wiesbaden

1. Wiesbaden Hbf – Hanau Hbf
2. Wiesbaden Hbf – Offenbach Ost
3. Kelsterbach – Frankfurt Hbf
4. Flughafen Regionalbahnhof – Frankfurt Hbf (former S15 service)
5. Rüsselsheim – Offenbach Ost
6. Rüsselsheim – Frankfurt Hbf

S8 (Rhine-Main S-Bahn)						Journey time		Station	Transfer	S-Bahn service since
1	2	3	4	5	6					
=== Wiesbaden ===
						0		Wiesbaden Hbf	S1 (Rhine-Main S-Bahn) S9 (Rhine-Main S-Bahn)	1978
						4	+4	Wiesbaden Ost	S1 (Rhine-Main S-Bahn) S9 (Rhine-Main S-Bahn)	1978
=== Mainz ===
						7	+3	Mainz Nord		1978
						12	+5	Mainz Hauptbahnhof		1978
						16	+4	Mainz Römisches Theater		1978
=== Kreis Groß-Gerau ===
						19	+3	Mainz-Gustavsburg		1978
						22	+3	Mainz-Bischofsheim	S9 (Rhine-Main S-Bahn)	1978
						25	+3	Rüsselsheim-Opelwerk	S9 (Rhine-Main S-Bahn)	1978
						28	+3	Rüsselsheim	S9 (Rhine-Main S-Bahn)	1978
						31	+3	Raunheim	S9 (Rhine-Main S-Bahn)	1978
						36	+5	Kelsterbach	S9 (Rhine-Main S-Bahn)	1978
=== Frankfurt am Main ===
						42	+6	Frankfurt Flughafen Regionalbahnhof	S9 (Rhine-Main S-Bahn)	1978
						44	+2	Gateway Gardens	S9 (Rhine-Main S-Bahn)	2019
						46	+2	Frankfurt Stadion	S7 (Rhine-Main S-Bahn) S9 (Rhine-Main S-Bahn)	1978
						49	+3	Frankfurt-Niederrad	S7 (Rhine-Main S-Bahn) S9 (Rhine-Main S-Bahn)	1978
						53	+4	Frankfurt Hbf	U4 U5	1978
						54	+5	Frankfurt Hbf (tief)	U4 U5	1978
						56	+2	Taunusanlage	S1 (Rhine-Main S-Bahn) S2 (Rhine-Main S-Bahn) S3 (Rhine-Main S-Bahn) S4 (Rhine-Main S-Bahn) S5 (Rhine-Main S-Bahn) S6 (Rhine-Main S-Bahn) S9 (Rhine-Main S-Bahn)	1978
						58	+2	Hauptwache	U1 U2 U3 U6 U7 U8	1978
						59	+1	Konstablerwache	U4 U5 U6 U7	1983
						61	+2	Ostendstraße	S1 (Rhine-Main S-Bahn) S2 (Rhine-Main S-Bahn) S3 (Rhine-Main S-Bahn) S4 (Rhine-Main S-Bahn) S5 (Rhine-Main S-Bahn) S6 (Rhine-Main S-Bahn) S9 (Rhine-Main S-Bahn)	1990
						63	+2	Mühlberg	S1 (Rhine-Main S-Bahn) S2 (Rhine-Main S-Bahn) S9 (Rhine-Main S-Bahn)	1992
=== Offenbach ===
						66	+3	Offenbach-Kaiserlei	S1 (Rhine-Main S-Bahn) S2 (Rhine-Main S-Bahn) S9 (Rhine-Main S-Bahn)	1995
						68	+2	Ledermuseum	S1 (Rhine-Main S-Bahn) S2 (Rhine-Main S-Bahn) S9 (Rhine-Main S-Bahn)	1995
						70	+2	Marktplatz	S1 (Rhine-Main S-Bahn) S2 (Rhine-Main S-Bahn) S9 (Rhine-Main S-Bahn)	1995
						73	+3	Offenbach Ost	S1 (Rhine-Main S-Bahn) S2 (Rhine-Main S-Bahn) S9 (Rhine-Main S-Bahn)	1995
=== Kreis Offenbach ===
						77	+4	Mühlheim	S9 (Rhine-Main S-Bahn)	1995
						79	+2	Mühlheim-Dietesheim	S9 (Rhine-Main S-Bahn)	1995
=== Main-Kinzig-Kreis ===
						82	+3	Hanau-Steinheim	S9 (Rhine-Main S-Bahn)	1995
						85	+3	Hanau Hbf	S9 (Rhine-Main S-Bahn)	1995
