= S9 (Rhine-Main S-Bahn) =

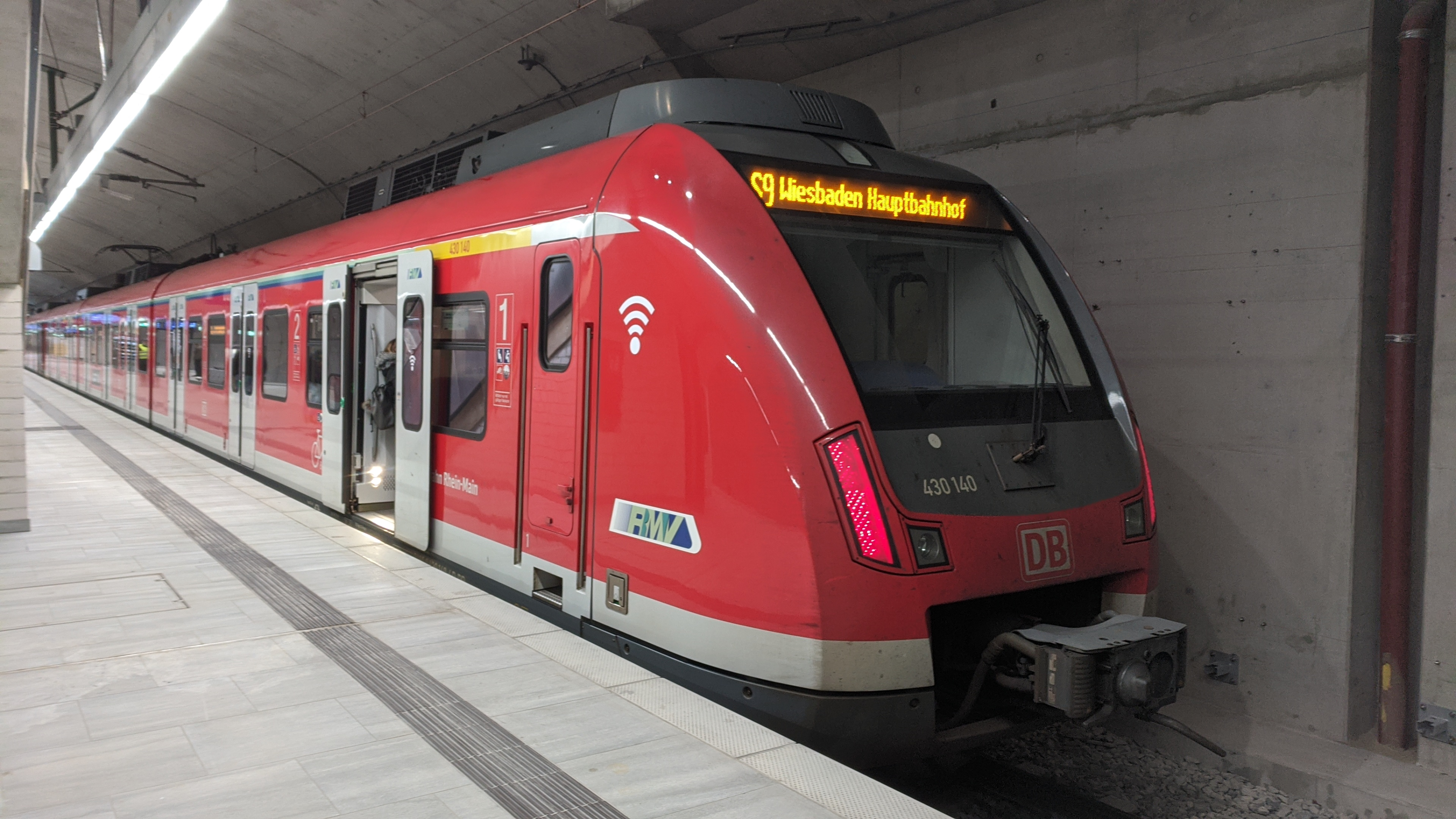
- S9 to Wiesbaden Hbf at Gateway Gardens station

Overview
- Status: Operational
- Owner: Rhein-Main-Verkehrsverbund
- Line number: 9
- Locale: Frankfurt Rhine-Main
- Termini: Wiesbaden Hauptbahnhof; Hanau Hauptbahnhof
- Stations: 26

Service
- Type: Rapid transit, Commuter rail
- System: S-Bahn Rhein-Main
- Services: Taunus Railway, Main Railway, Citytunnel Frankfurt, Frankfurt Schlachthof–Hanau railway
- Route number: 645.9
- Operator(s): DB Regio
- Depot(s): Frankfurt Hbf
- Rolling stock: DBAG Class 430

History
- Opened: 2000

Technical
- Line length: 66.1 km (41.1 mi)
- Track gauge: 1,435 mm (4 ft 8 1/2 in) standard gauge
- Electrification: Overhead line

The S9 service of the S-Bahn Rhein-Main system bearing the KBS (German scheduled railway route) number 645.9. It is largely concurrent with the S8 service, diverging only to bypass Mainz (which the S8 serves locally).

== Routes ==
=== City tunnel ===
The city tunnel is an underground, pure S-Bahn route used by almost all services (except for the S7 service which terminates at the central station). In a short section between Mühlberg and Offenbach-Kaiserlei a line parallel with the South Main railway is used.

== History ==
This service was first introduced in 2000 to provide an alternative route to Wiesbaden via Frankfurt Airport skipping Rhineland-Palatinate and its capital Mainz.

== Operation ==
1. Wiesbaden Hbf – Hanau Hbf
2. Wiesbaden Hbf – Frankfurt Hbf
3. Wiesbaden Hbf – Offenbach Ost (sundays only)
4. Flughafen Regionalbahnhof – Frankfurt Hbf (former S15 service)
5. Flughafen Regionalbahnhof – Offenbach Ost (sundays only)

S9 (Rhine-Main S-Bahn)						Journey time	Station	Transfer	S-Bahn service since
1	2	3	4	5					
=== Wiesbaden ===
					0		Wiesbaden Hbf	S1 (Rhine-Main S-Bahn) S8 (Rhine-Main S-Bahn)	1978
					4	+4	Wiesbaden Ost	S1 (Rhine-Main S-Bahn) S8 (Rhine-Main S-Bahn)	1978
					8	+4	Mainz-Kastel	S1 (Rhine-Main S-Bahn)	1978
=== Kreis Groß-Gerau ===
					15	+7	Mainz-Bischofsheim	S8 (Rhine-Main S-Bahn)	1978
					18	+3	Rüsselsheim-Opelwerk	S8 (Rhine-Main S-Bahn)	1978
					21	+3	Rüsselsheim	S8 (Rhine-Main S-Bahn)	1978
					24	+3	Raunheim	S8 (Rhine-Main S-Bahn)	1978
					29	+5	Kelsterbach	S8 (Rhine-Main S-Bahn)	1978
=== Frankfurt am Main ===
					35	+6	Frankfurt Flughafen Regionalbahnhof	S8 (Rhine-Main S-Bahn)	1978
					37	+2	Gateway Gardens	S8 (Rhine-Main S-Bahn)	2019
					39	+3	Frankfurt Stadion	S7 (Rhine-Main S-Bahn) S8 (Rhine-Main S-Bahn)	1978
					42	+3	Frankfurt-Niederrad	S7 (Rhine-Main S-Bahn) S8 (Rhine-Main S-Bahn)	1978
					46	+4	Frankfurt Hbf	U4 U5	1978
					47	+5	Frankfurt Hbf (tief)	U4 U5	1978
					49	+2	Taunusanlage	S1 (Rhine-Main S-Bahn) S2 (Rhine-Main S-Bahn) S3 (Rhine-Main S-Bahn) S4 (Rhine-Main S-Bahn) S5 (Rhine-Main S-Bahn) S6 (Rhine-Main S-Bahn) S8 (Rhine-Main S-Bahn)	1978
					51	+2	Hauptwache	U1 U2 U3 U6 U7 U8	1978
					52	+1	Konstablerwache	U4 U5 U6 U7	1983
					54	+2	Ostendstraße	S1 (Rhine-Main S-Bahn) S2 (Rhine-Main S-Bahn) S3 (Rhine-Main S-Bahn) S4 (Rhine-Main S-Bahn) S5 (Rhine-Main S-Bahn) S6 (Rhine-Main S-Bahn) S8 (Rhine-Main S-Bahn)	1990
					56	+2	Mühlberg	S1 (Rhine-Main S-Bahn) S2 (Rhine-Main S-Bahn) S8 (Rhine-Main S-Bahn)	1992
=== Offenbach ===
					59	+3	Offenbach-Kaiserlei	S1 (Rhine-Main S-Bahn) S2 (Rhine-Main S-Bahn) S8 (Rhine-Main S-Bahn)	1995
					61	+2	Ledermuseum	S1 (Rhine-Main S-Bahn) S2 (Rhine-Main S-Bahn) S8 (Rhine-Main S-Bahn)	1995
					63	+2	Marktplatz	S1 (Rhine-Main S-Bahn) S2 (Rhine-Main S-Bahn) S8 (Rhine-Main S-Bahn)	1995
					66	+3	Offenbach Ost	S1 (Rhine-Main S-Bahn) S2 (Rhine-Main S-Bahn) S8 (Rhine-Main S-Bahn)	1995
=== Kreis Offenbach ===
					70	+4	Mühlheim	S8 (Rhine-Main S-Bahn)	1995
					72	+2	Mühlheim-Dietesheim	S8 (Rhine-Main S-Bahn)	1995
=== Main-Kinzig-Kreis ===
					75	+3	Hanau-Steinheim	S8 (Rhine-Main S-Bahn)	1995
					78	+3	Hanau Hbf	S8 (Rhine-Main S-Bahn)	1995
