= East Richmond railway station =

East Richmond railway station may refer to:

- East Richmond railway station, Melbourne, in Victoria, Australia
- East Richmond railway station, Sydney, in New South Wales, Australia
