= Offenbach Ost station =

Railway station in Offenbach am Main, Hesse, Germany

Offenbach (Main) Ost
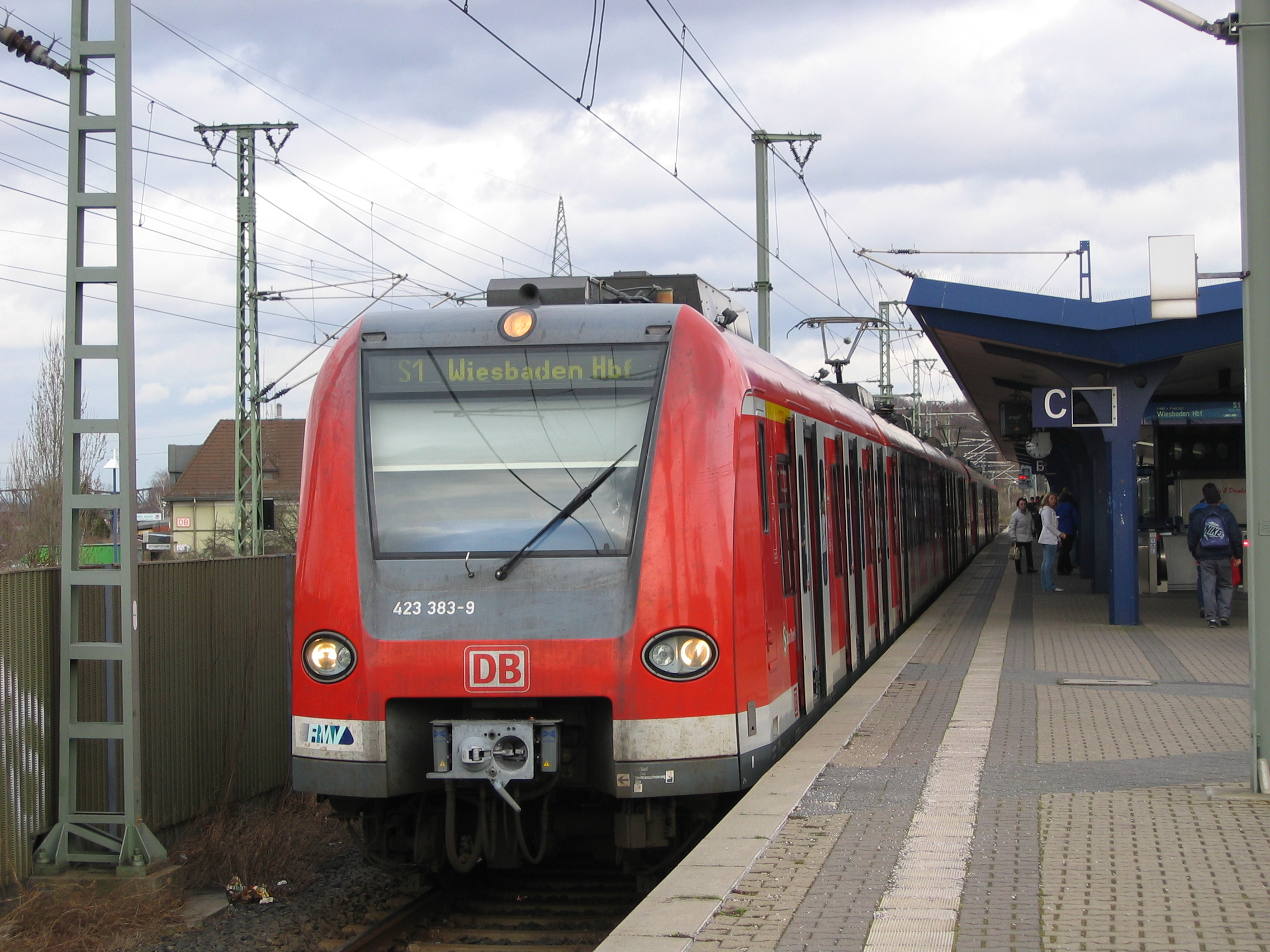
- S1 train to Wiesbaden Hauptbahnhof (track 3)

General information
- Location: Untere Grenzstraße 86, Offenbach am Main, Hesse; Germany
- Coordinates: 50°06′10″N 8°47′04″E
- Lines: Frankfurt–Göttingen railway (11.7 km); Frankfurt Schlachthof–Hanau railway (60.5 km); Offenbach–Dieburg–Reinheim (1.5 km)
- Platforms: 2
- Tracks: 3

Construction
- Accessible: Yes

Other information
- Station code: 4743
- DS100 code: FOO
- IBNR: 8004645
- Category: 3
- Fare zone: : 3601
- Website: www.bahnhof.de

History
- Opened: 15 November 1873

Services
| Preceding station | Rhine-Main S-Bahn | Following station |
|---|---|---|
| Marktplatz towards Wiesbaden Hbf | S1 (Rhine-Main S-Bahn) | Offenbach-Bieber towards Rödermark-Ober Roden |
| Marktplatz towards Niedernhausen | S2 (Rhine-Main S-Bahn) | Offenbach-Bieber towards Dietzenbach |
| Marktplatz towards Wiesbaden Hbf | S8 (Rhine-Main S-Bahn) | Mühlheim (Main) towards Hanau Hbf |
| Marktplatz towards Wiesbaden Hbf | S9 (Rhine-Main S-Bahn) | Mühlheim (Main) towards Hanau Hbf |
Location
- Location within Hesse Location within Germany Location within Europe

Offenbach (Main) Ost station is the second most important station after Offenbach Hauptbahnhof in Offenbach am Main in the German state of Hesse. It is served exclusively by the Rhine-Main S-Bahn. Although Offenbach Hauptbahnhof is served by some Regional-Express services and a few intercity services each day, it is rated as a category 4 station, while Offenbach Ost station is rated as a category 3 station.

== History ==
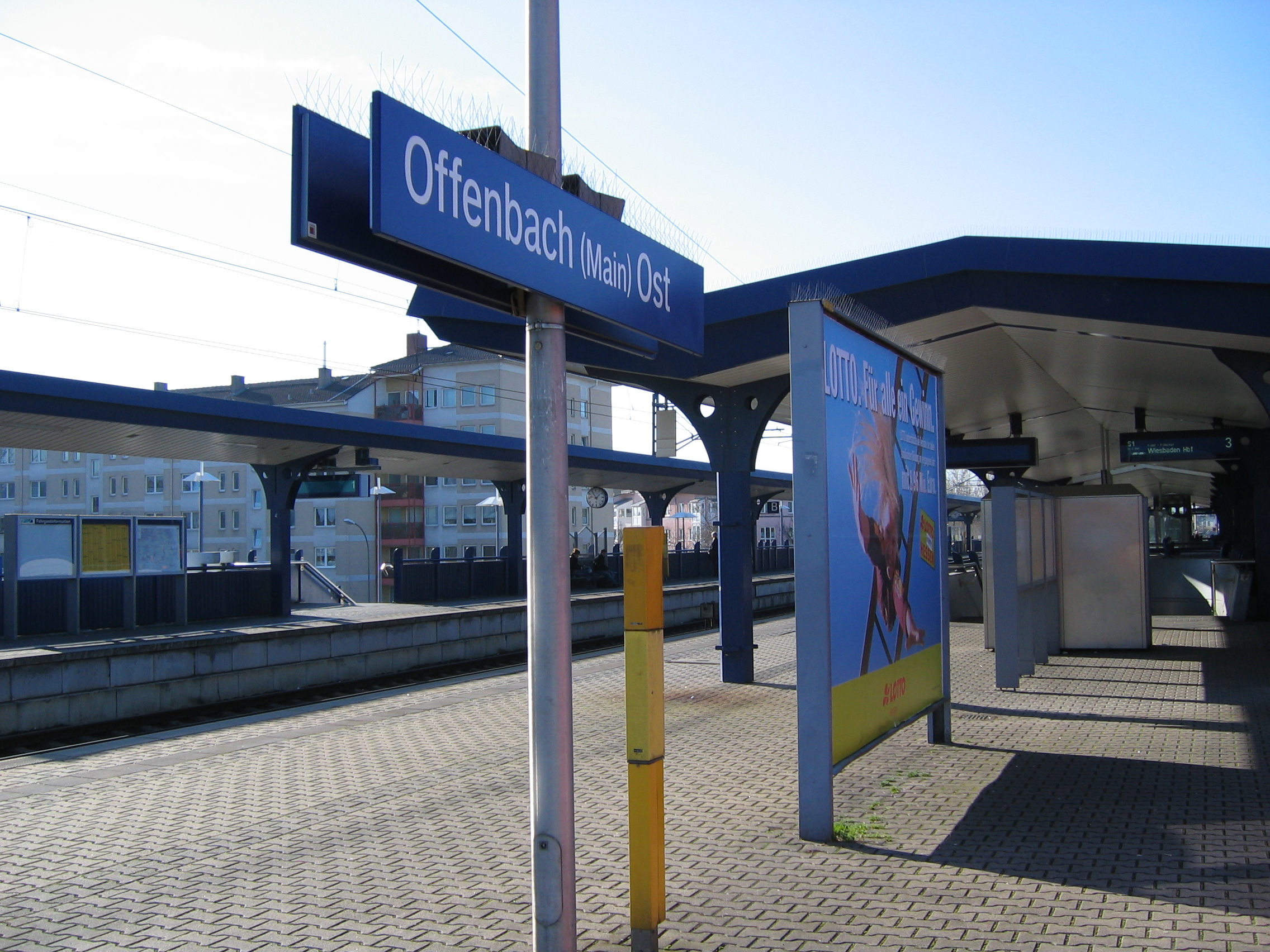
Offenbach (Main) Ost station

Offenbach Ost station was opened on 15 November 1873 on the Frankfurt-Hanau line. On 30 October 1896 the Rodgau Railway (Offenbach–Reinheim line) was opened.

Line S1 of the Rhine-Main S-Bahn has been operating on the Rodgau railway since 2003, not to Reinheim, but only as far as Rödermark-Ober-Roden station. Between Dieburg and Reinheim the line has been dismantled. On 23 May 1995, the Offenbach City Tunnel was opened. S-Bahn lines S1, line S2, line S8 and line S9 run through the tunnel to Wiesbaden Hauptbahnhof or Niedernhausen via Frankfurt (Main) Hauptbahnhof underground.

Simultaneously with the opening of the S-Bahn tunnel, an S-Bahn line was opened parallel with the Frankfurt-Hanau line, known as the Frankfurt Schlachthof–Hanau railway. Since its opening that has been operated by services of S-Bahn lines S8 and S9 to Hanau.

== Infrastructure ==
The station has three platform tracks that are used for S-Bahn services on lines S1, S2, S8 and S9. There is no platform on the main line used by regional and long distance services on the south Main railway any more and its tracks, which are north of the S-Bahn, are separated by a soundproof wall. At the western end of the station, two tracks run into the tunnel towards Frankfurt and one track runs to Offenbach Hauptbahnhof. This track was formerly used regularly by line S 2, but it is now only used in exceptional cases. At the eastern end of the station, the S-Bahn line branches at a level junction towards Hanau and Offenbach-Bieber. Between the branches there are sidings for parking S-Bahn trains, as many trains from Frankfurt terminate at Offenbach Ost.

The city of Offenbach has proposed that this station be renamed Offenbach Hauptbahnhof because it has better transport connections than the current Offenbach Hauptbahnhof.

== Operations ==
All S-Bahn services run at 30-minute intervals. In the peak hour, extras services are run so that each services runs at 15-minute intervals. In the peak hour lines S8 and S9 run on almost the same route, generally at 15-minute intervals. Line S 8 runs only during the peak hour to Hanau; at other times it begins or ends at Offenbach Ost. Line S1 services sometimes begin in Offenbach Ost and then just runs to Frankfurt-Höchst or Hochheim.

Prior to 14 June 2010, some S 2 services ran from Offenbach Ost to Offenbach Hauptbahnhof because of lack of capacity in the Frankfurt S-Bahn tunnels. These now all run through the tunnels.

=== Buses ===
Offenbach Ost Station is served by bus lines 102, 103, 107, 108 and 120 and the Frankfurt night bus line n61. These buses are operated by the Regionalverkehr Kurhessen and Offenbacher Verkehrs-Betriebe.
