= Hildesheim Ost railway station =

Railway station in Hildesheim, Germany

Hildesheim Ost
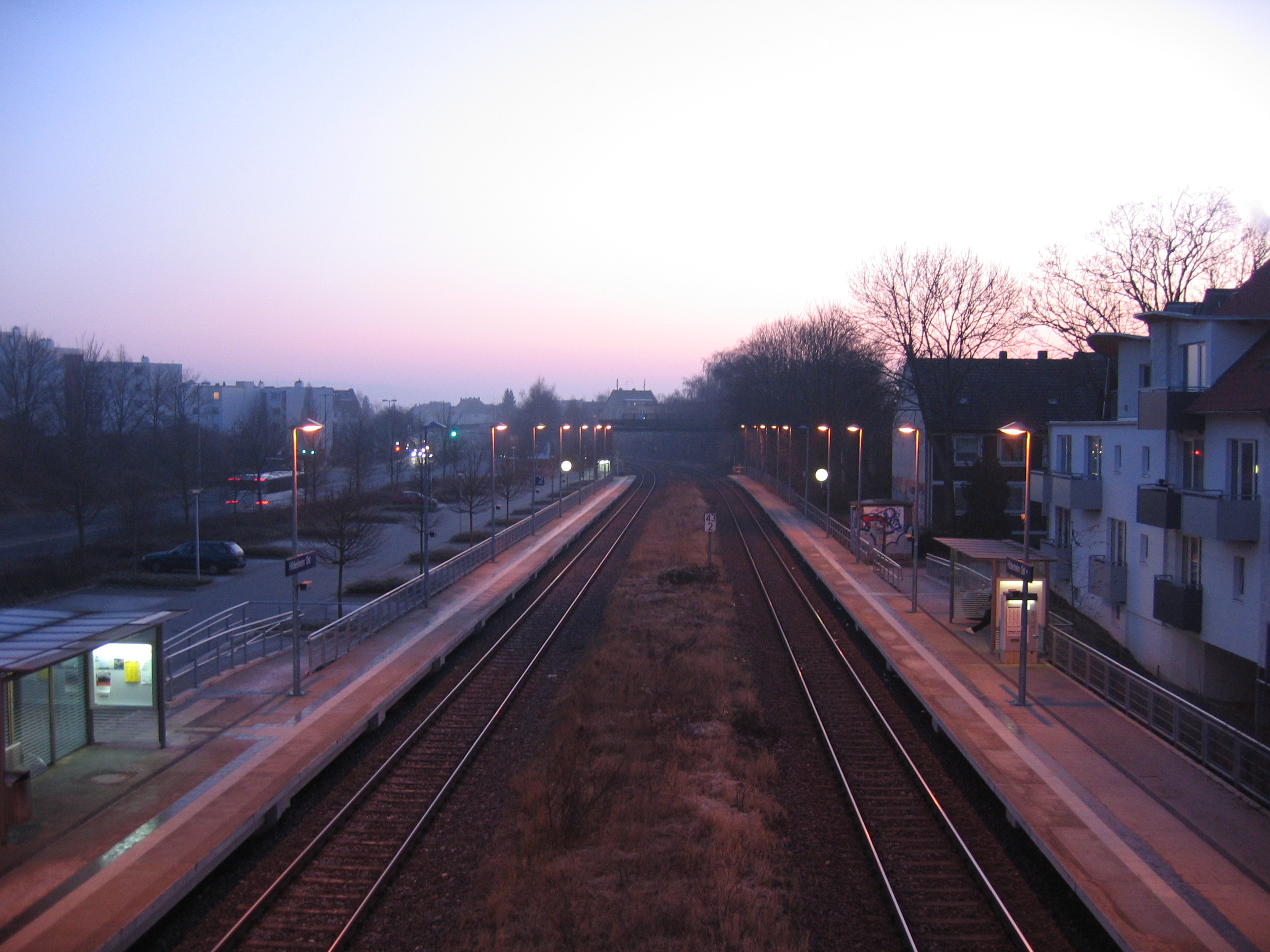

General information
- Location: Immengarten 16, Hildesheim, Lower Saxony; Germany
- Coordinates: 52°8.74824′N 9°57.7776′E
- Lines: Hildesheim–Goslar (KBS 320)
- Platforms: 2

Other information
- Station code: 2766
- DS100 code: HHIO
- IBNR: 8002830
- Category: 6
- Fare zone: ROSA: 100 (ROSA tickets accepted on RB79); GVH: D (ROSA transitional tariff, monthly passes only)
- Website: www.bahnhof.de

History
- Opened: 30 June 1875

Services
Preceding station		Following station
Hildesheim Hbf towards Hannover Hbf	RE 10	Derneburg towards Bad Harzburg
Preceding station	Start	Following station
Hildesheim Hbf Terminus	RB 79	Groß Düngen towards Bodenburg
Location
- Location within Lower Saxony

Hildesheim Ost (east) station at Immengarten in the Hildesheim district of Oststadt (east town) is a station on the Hildesheim–Goslar railway in the German state of Lower Saxony.

== History ==
In the early 1870s, a station was built by the Magdeburg–Halberstadt Railway Company (German: Magdeburg-Halberstädter Eisenbahngesellschaft, MHE) as the Bahnhof am Friesentore (station at Friesentore) and later operated as the Altenbekener Bahnhof (station of the Altenbeken Railway). The first freight train left it on 19 May and the first passenger train left it on 30 June 1875 at a cruising speed of 30 km/h. The station was necessary because the HAE was not allowed to use the state railway station (close to the current Hildesheim Hauptbahnhof).

In 1880, the HAE was nationalised. After trains began to use the state station from 20 May 1880, the station was closed and all buildings were demolished except the goods shed. The station building was rebuilt in Bad Lauterberg. After persistent protests from the citizenry and the collection of funds amounting to 12,000 marks, the mayor of the city of Hildesheim was presented with another 3000 marks for the re-establishment of the station. The new station was opened in the former goods shed on 1 May 1893. The malt factory was opened on the site of today's nursing home in Immengarten in 1878. Glückauf, a coal trader on the corner of Immengarten and Gravelottestraße, opened its own railway siding in 1897. In World War II, the station was slightly damaged by an air raid on 22 February 1945. By 1963 there was a separate station bookstore. A new station building was built in 1967 and the newest signal-box in Hildesheim was housed in it in 1978.

All sets of points and sidings were closed in 1988. As a result, the east station has is now classified as a Haltepunkt (halt). Subsequently the island platform was replaced by a second side platform and connected by a pedestrian bridge over the tracks, which made a barrier between the two through tracks superfluous; these had been manually operated for a long time. A ticket machine was also installed. The demolition of the station building in 1990 created a vacant lot.

== Train services ==
The station is served by the following services:

- Regional services RE 10 Hannover - Hildesheim - Goslar - Bad Harzburg
- Local services RB 79 Hildesheim - Bad Salzdetfurth – Bodenburg
