= Frankfurt Schlachthof–Hanau railway =

Railway line in Germany

Frankfurt Schlachthof–Hanau

Overview
- Status: Operational
- Line number: 3680
- Locale: Hesse, Germany
- Termini: Frankfurt (Main) Schlachthof; Hanau Hbf.

Service
- Type: S-Bahn
- Route number: 645.8-9

History
- Opened: Stages between 1992 - 1995

Technical
- Line length: 18.0 km (11.2 mi)
- Number of tracks: Double track
- Track gauge: 1,435 mm (4 ft 8 1/2 in) standard gauge
- Electrification: 15 kV 16.7 Hz AC Overhead line
- Operating speed: 120 km/h (75 mph)

The Frankfurt Schlachthof–Hanau railway is a railway line that is used by the Rhine-Main S-Bahn and connects the Frankfurt City Tunnel via the Offenbach City Tunnel and Mühlheim with Hanau. It mostly runs parallel to the Frankfurt–Göttingen railway and was built to relieve the busy long-distance railway line. To distinguish it from the planned North Main S-Bahn to Hanau via Maintal, the route is also referred to as the South Main S-Bahn.

== History ==
Planning options for the route between Frankfurt and Offenbach

Prior to the construction of the line between Frankfurt and Offenbach, five different options were examined. Three options provided for the extension of the Frankfurt City Tunnel in different forms, in which a tunnel from Oberrad was planned in the southern (option D), middle (option C) or northern (option B) areas and the line would then run from the western boundary of the Offenbach built-up area parallel to the existing long-distance line towards Offenbach Hbf. However, these options would have meant—at least during the construction period, possibly also permanently due to changes in groundwater flows–a massive intervention in the usability of the areas for agriculture, so that some saw it as a threat to farms in Oberrad. After protests, the city of Frankfurt withdrew its original approval for the Oberrad routes.

Another option (option A) envisaged building the line largely parallel to the existing line. Only at Kaiserlei would a short tunnel have been built to bring the S-Bahn line closer to the town. Instead of the option that was ultimately implemented, the line would then have turned south to run parallel to the long-distance line again a little later and continue to Offenbach Hbf. Just as with the line implemented, this draft provided for the option of building a station to serve up to 20,000 visitors to a planned sports hall.

In the autumn of 1983, a cost–benefit analysis by Gerhard Heimerl for the route in Offenbach came to the conclusion that an underground route offered greater benefits than the development of the existing line in Offenbach's built-up area, despite the costs. The decision was therefore made to run the line parallel to the existing line only on the short section north of Oberrad in order to realise the Offenbach City Tunnel in Offenbach.

In the eastern section, the tunnel largely follows the route of the former Frankfurt–Offenbach Local Railway, which was closed in 1955 due to financial losses and low demand and Berliner Straße (street) was built on its route.

=== Construction ===
The first section between Frankfurt (Main) Schlachthof junction and Frankfurt (Main) Mühlberg station was opened in 1992. This part of the line lies entirely in a branch of the Frankfurt City Tunnel.

The section of the line to Offenbach Ost through the Offenbach City Tunnel went into operation on 23 May 1995. A few days later, on 28 May, the entire line to Hanau was put into operation.

== Route ==
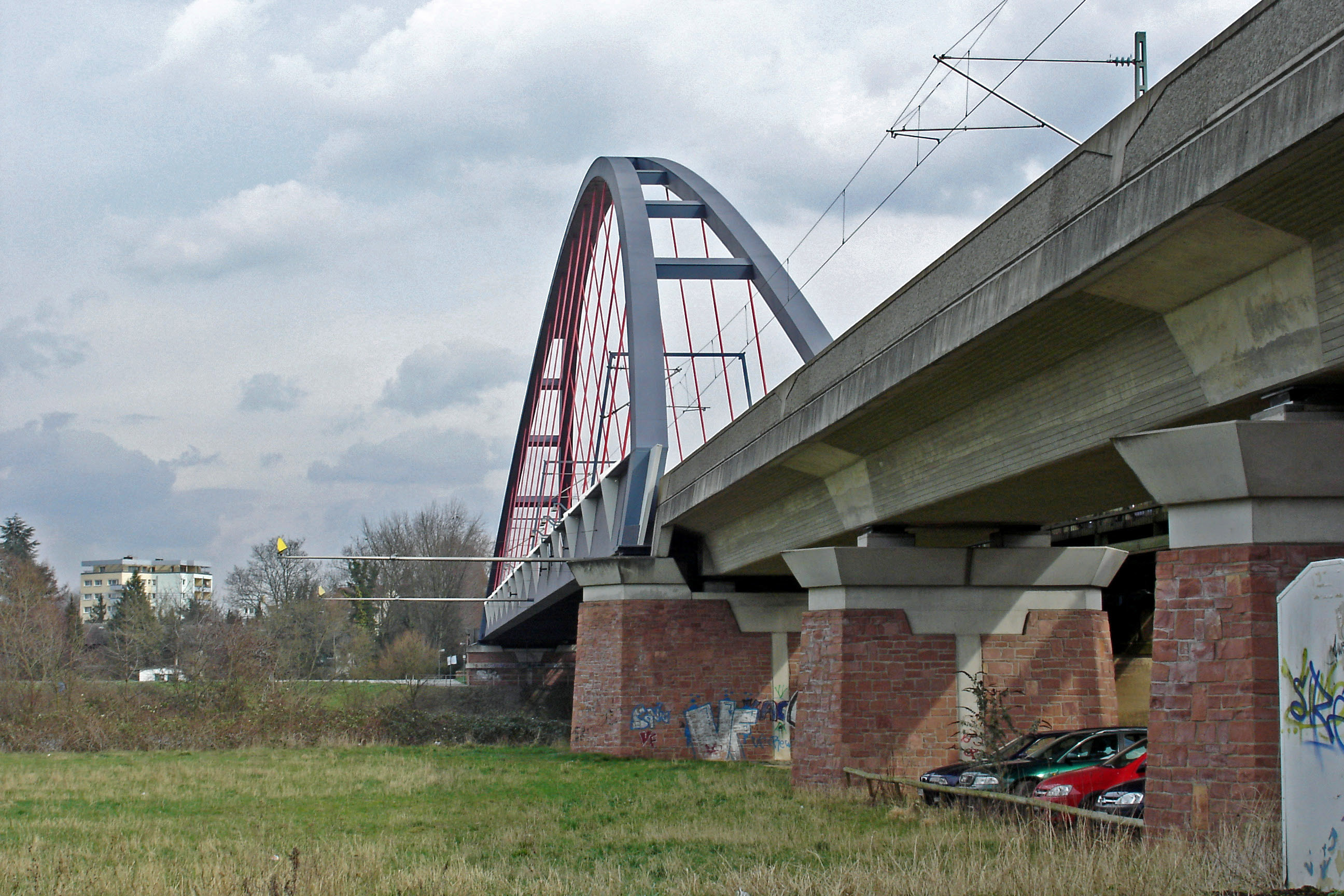
Main Bridge

The line separates between the Ostendstraße and Lokalbahnhof stations in the Frankfurt (Main) Schlachthof depot at a level junction from the Frankfurt Hbf (underground)–Frankfurt Süd railway and runs briefly above ground at the former Frankfurt-Oberrad station, parallel to the Frankfurt–Göttingen railway, using the former route of the Frankfurt–Offenbach Local Railway. It continues to follow the line, even when it dives into the Offenbach City Tunnel shortly afterwards. The line bypasses Offenbach (Main) Hauptbahnhof and runs to Offenbach Ost, where it resurfaces and resumes running parallel with the long-distance line to Hanau Hauptbahnhof. Shortly before the end of the line, it crosses the Main, otherwise the line runs on the south bank of the Main.

The S-Bahn route runs south of the long-distance line between Offenbach Ost and Dietesheim and then pivots to the north side. The entire section is single-track except for the section between Mühlheim and Dietesheim, with Steinheim station also only having one platform edge. A single-track It ends at the northern-most platform in Hanau Hauptbahnhof so that in future it can also be served by the North Main S-Bahn line.

The chainage is continued from the Frankfurt Hbf–Frankfurt Süd line. This begins in Frankfurt (Main) Hbf (underground) at kilometre 50.

== Services ==
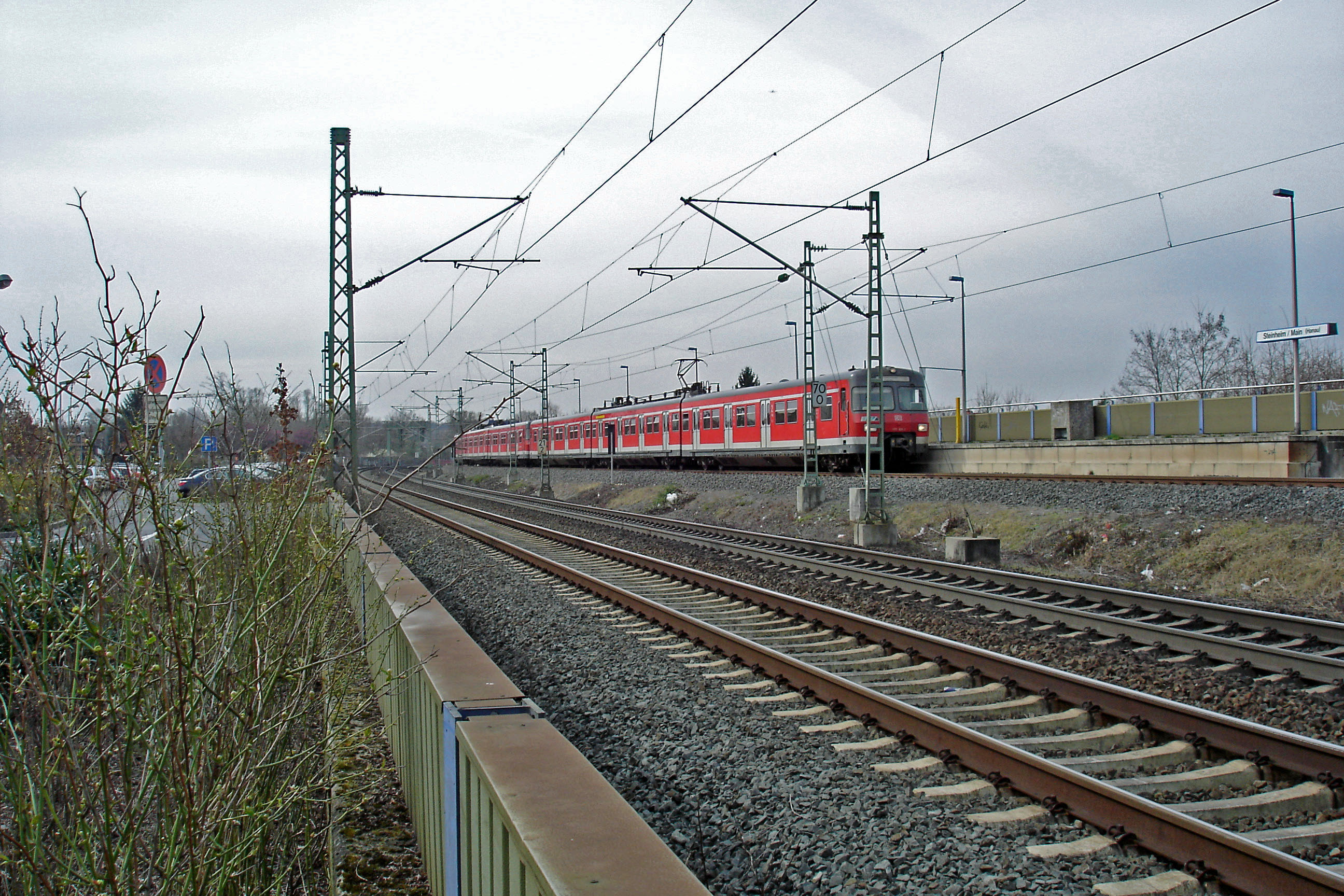
Steinheim (Main) S-Bahn station

Today, S-Bahn lines S1, S2, S8 and S9 operate on the line. Lines S1 and S2 only use the line between Frankfurt and Offenbach Ost, from where they continue to Rödermark-Ober Roden and Dietzenbach respectively. The S8 only runs to Hanau during the peak hour and otherwise ends in Offenbach Ost. The S9 runs over the entire length of the line.

All S-Bahn lines run every half hour, so there are eight trains an hour between Frankfurt and Offenbach Ost and two trains an hour between Offenbach Ost and Hanau. During rush hour, there is a 15-minute interval on the Offenbach–Hanau section. Until November 2014, mainly DB Class 420 trains were used, but since then usually class 430 trains are used.

Due to earmarked funding, only S-Bahn trains are generally allowed to run between Offenbach Ost and Hanau north side.
