= Hanau Hauptbahnhof =

Railway station in Germany

Hanau Hbf
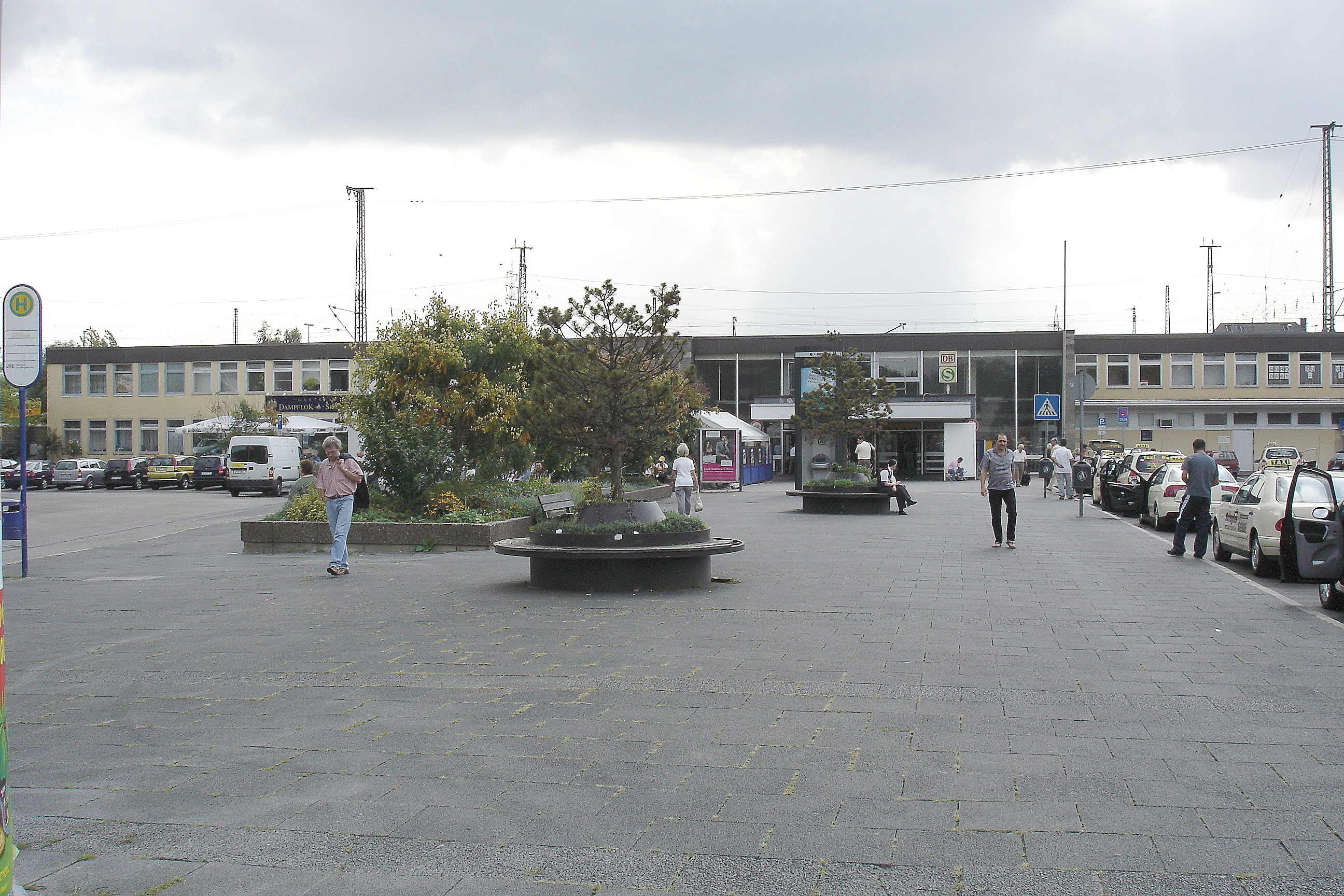
- Station forecourt

General information
- Location: Am Hauptbahnhof 14a, Hanau, Hesse; Germany
- Coordinates: 50°07′17″N 08°55′47″E
- Owner: Deutsche Bahn
- Operator: DB Station&Service
- Lines: Friedberg-Hanau (KBS 633); Frankfurt–Göttingen (South Main line, KBS 615, 641); Hanau–Eberbach (KBS 641); Frankfurt–Aschaffenburg (North Main line, KBS 640); Frankfurt–Hanau (KBS 615)
- Platforms: 11

Construction
- Accessible: Partly (platforms 1, 2, 102, 103, 104, 106 only)

Other information
- Station code: 2537
- DS100 code: FH
- IBNR: 8000150
- Category: 2
- Fare zone: : 3001
- Website: www.bahnhof.de

History
- Opened: 1 May 1867
- Electrified: 1958

Passengers
- 2010: About 20,000
Services
Preceding station	DB Fernverkehr	Following station
Frankfurt (Main) Hbf towards Hamburg-Altona	ICE 1 Sprinter	Aschaffenburg Hbf towards Passau Hbf
Frankfurt (Main) Süd towards Brig, Chur or Interlaken Ost	ICE 12	Fulda towards Berlin Ostbahnhof
Frankfurt (Main) Süd towards Frankfurt (Main) Hbf, Frankfurt Airport, Karlsruhe Hbf or Stuttgart Hbf	ICE 13	Fulda towards Berlin Ostbahnhof
Frankfurt (Main) Hbf towards Stuttgart Hbf	ICE 16	Fulda One-way operation
Frankfurt (Main) Hbf One-way operation	ICE/ECE 20	Fulda towards Hamburg Hbf
Frankfurt (Main) Süd One-way operation	ICE 22	Fulda towards Hamburg Hbf or Oldenburg Hbf
Frankfurt (Main) Hbf towards Dortmund Hbf	ICE 91	Würzburg Hbf towards Wien Hbf
Preceding station	DB Regio Bayern	Following station
Hanau West towards Frankfurt (Main) Hbf	RE 54	Kahl (Main) towards Bamberg
Offenbach (Main) Hbf towards Frankfurt (Main) Hbf	RE 55	Kahl (Main) towards Würzburg Hbf
Preceding station	DB Regio Mitte	Following station
Hanau Nord towards Gießen	RB 49	Terminus
Offenbach (Main) Hbf towards Frankfurt (Main) Hbf	RE 50	Langenselbold towards Bebra
Wolfgang (Kr Hanau) towards Frankfurt (Main) Hbf	RB 51	Hanau-Wolfgang towards Wächtersbach
Preceding station	Hessische Landesbahn	Following station
Hanau West towards Rüsselsheim Opelwerk	RB 58	Großauheim towards Laufach
Maintal Ost towards Frankfurt Airport regional	RE 59	Kahl (Main) towards Bamberg
Preceding station	VIAS	Following station
Offenbach (Main) Hbf towards Frankfurt (Main) Hbf	RE 85	Hainburg Hainstadt towards Groß-Umstadt-Wiebelsbach
Terminus	RB 86	Hanau Klein-Auheim towards Groß-Umstadt-Wiebelsbach
Preceding station		Following station
Terminus	RB 56	Großauheim towards Schöllkrippen
Preceding station	Rhine-Main S-Bahn	Following station
Steinheim (Main) towards Wiesbaden Hbf	S8 (Rhine-Main S-Bahn)	Terminus
Steinheim (Main) towards Wiesbaden Hbf	S9 (Rhine-Main S-Bahn)	Terminus
Location

Hanau Hauptbahnhof is a railway station in Hanau in the German state of Hesse, and is a major railway junction east of Frankfurt am Main. It was opened in 1867, but the current building was built in the late 1960s. It is located about 1.5 kilometres (0.93 mi) south-east of central Hanau. It is classified by Deutsche Bahn (DB) as a category 2 station and has many train services, including Intercity Express, regional and S-Bahn services.

== Links ==
Hanau Hauptbahnhof is a central hub of the railway network that is served by six routes. It is served by:

- Frankfurt-Hanau Railway (Hanau–Maintal–Frankfurt)
- Hanau–Kahl–Aschaffenburg
- Frankfurt–Göttingen railway
- Frankfurt Schlachthof–Hanau railway (South Main S-Bahn)
- Friedberg–Hanau railway to Friedberg
- Odenwald Railway (Hanau–Groß-Umstadt Wiebelsbach–Eberbach)

== History ==
Today's Hanau Hauptbahnhof was opened on 1 May 1867 on the route of the Frankfurt–Bebra railway as a temporary terminus called Hanau Ost (east). The first station in Hanau was opened in 1848 as the terminus of the Frankfurt-Hanau Railway Company (Frankfurt-Hanauer Eisenbahn-Gesellschaft), which is west of central Hanau at the site of the current Hanau West station.

Hanau Ost station was built at the junction between the extension of the Frankfurt-Hanau railway (which runs on the north bank of the Main) connecting with the Main–Spessart railway to Aschaffenburg and the Kinzig Valley Railway to Bebra. Its position was chosen to allow the building of a bridge over the Main to Steinheim as part of the south bank route to Frankfurt. At the same time Hanau depot (Bahnbetriebswerk Hanau) was built at Heideäcker. An entrance building was built at Hanau Ost on the island between the line towards Fulda (northern tracks) and the line to Aschaffenburg (southern tracks).

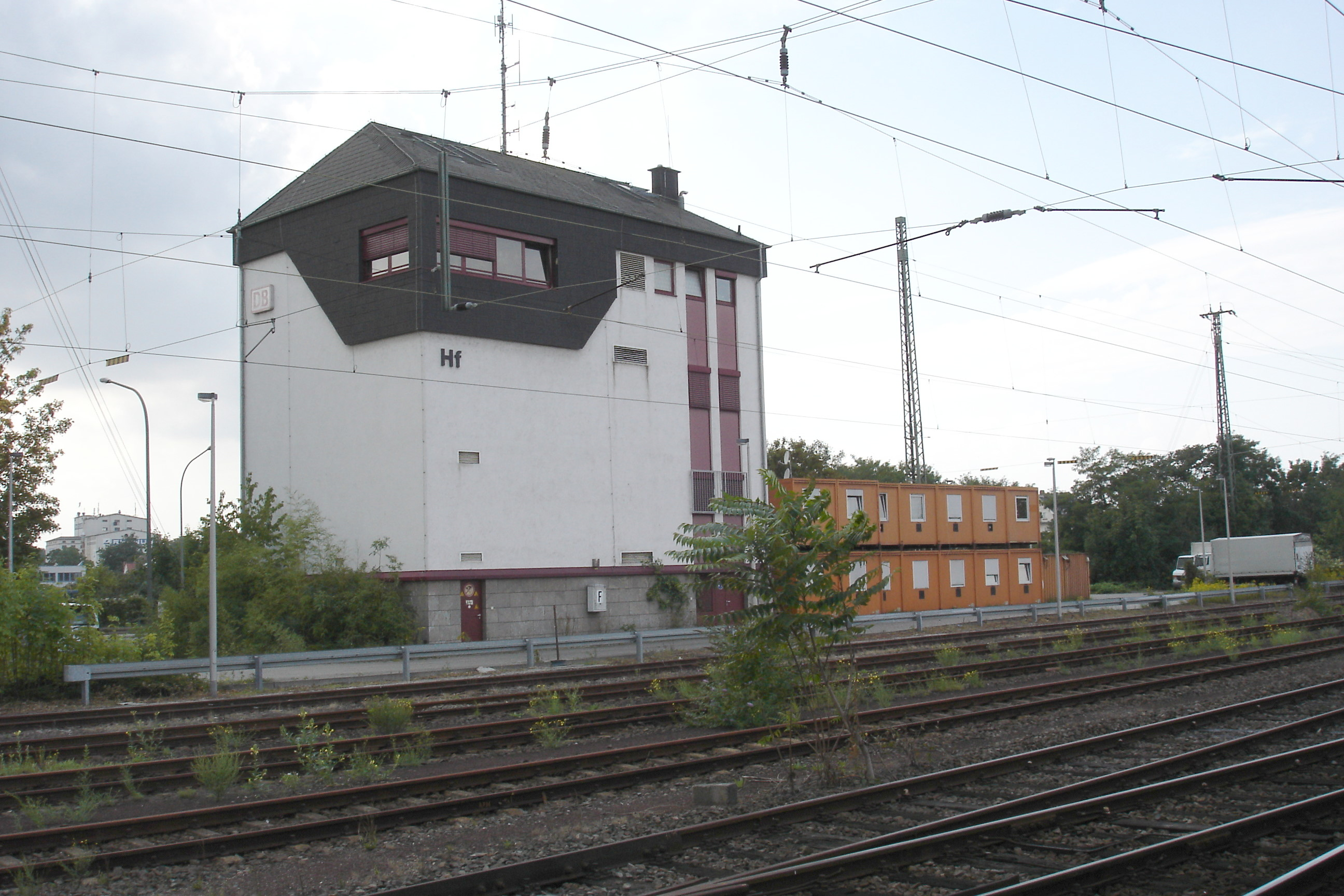
Signal box

The constraints imposed by the position of the crossing of the Main explain why the station was built so far from the centre of the city, which is still a significant problem for public transport in Hanau: two centres must be served: the Hauptbahnhof and the downtown bus junction in Freiheitsplatz. Until the end of the Second World War, the station served a tram line of the Hanau Tramway (Hanauer Straßenbahn).

On 15 May 1927, the station was renamed from Hanau Ost station to Hanau Hauptbahnhof.

The original station building was demolished in 1966 and replaced by a building north of the tracks with a spacious station forecourt. The original location as an island station can still be recognised from the track numbering and road connections between the tracks to the nearby park and ride facility. The floor level of the main level of the new station was determined by the location of the existing pedestrian underpass, which was retained. Since the station was built partly in a former river bed of the Main, there will always be problems with water penetration, especially after storms. The passenger accessible part of the entrance building was transformed fundamentally in the early 1990s with the reorganisation of baggage and express freight operations.

== Operations ==
=== Long-distance services ===
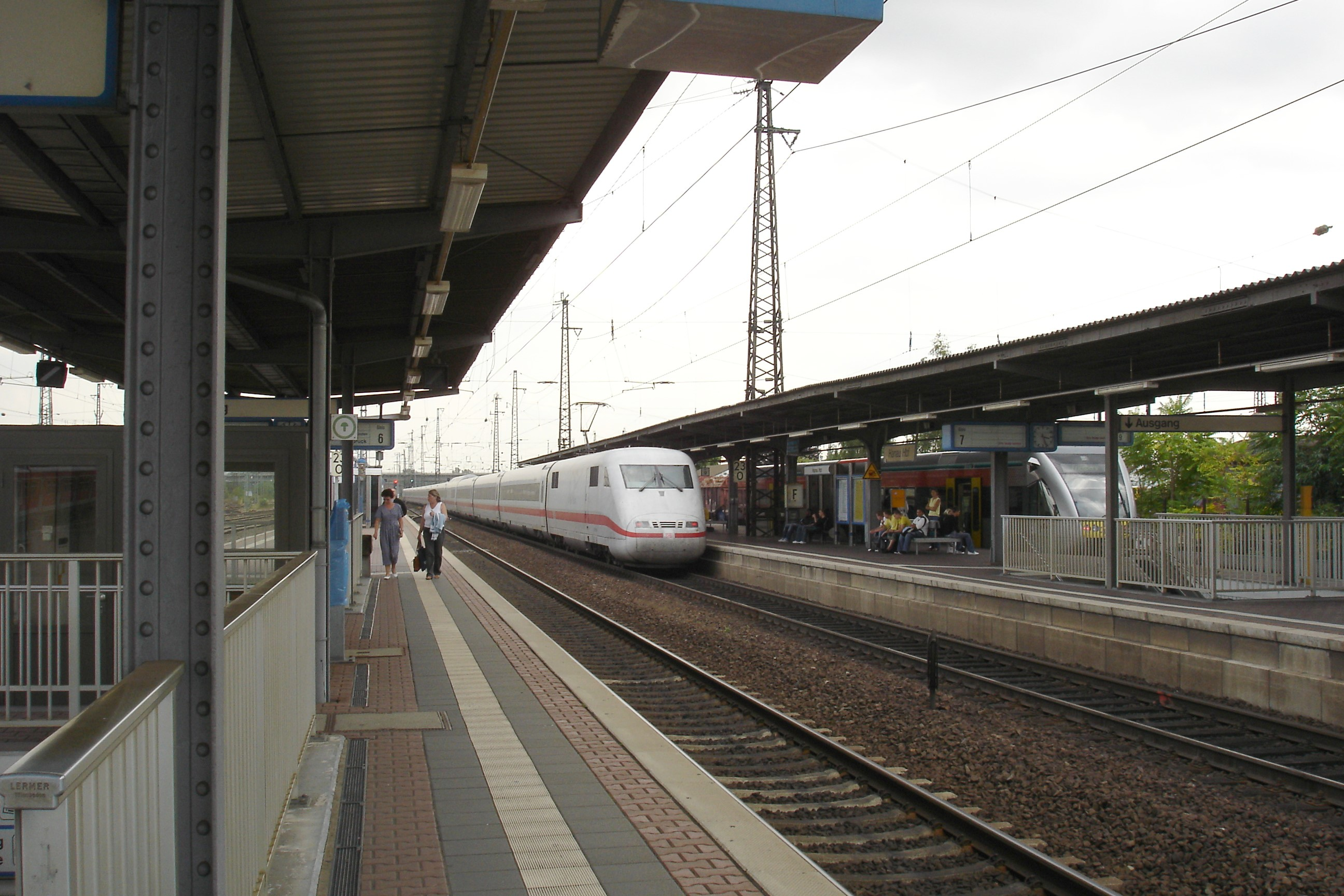
ICE exiting

Hanau station is classified by Deutsche Bahn (DB) as a category 2 station. It is connected by Intercity-Express and Intercity services to cities in a large part of Germany and some cities outside Germany.

Line	Route	Frequency
ICE 1	Hamburg-Altona – Hamburg – Essen – Duisburg – Düsseldorf – Cologne – Bonn – Koblenz – Mainz – Frankfurt Airport – Frankfurt – Hanau – Würzburg – Nuremberg – Regensburg – Passau	Two train pairs
ICE 12	Switzerland – Basel – Freiburg – Karlsruhe – Mannheim – Frankfurt – Hanau – Kassel – Braunschweig – Berlin – Berlin Ostbahnhof	Every 2 hours
ICE 13	Berlin Ostbahnhof – Berlin – Braunschweig – Kassel-Wilhelmshöhe – Fulda – Hanau – Frankfurt South – Frankfurt / Frankfurt Airport / Karlsruhe / Stuttgart	Every 2 hours
ICE 91	Frankfurt – Hanau – Würzburg – Nuremberg – Passau – Linz – Vienna	Every 2 hours

=== Regional services ===
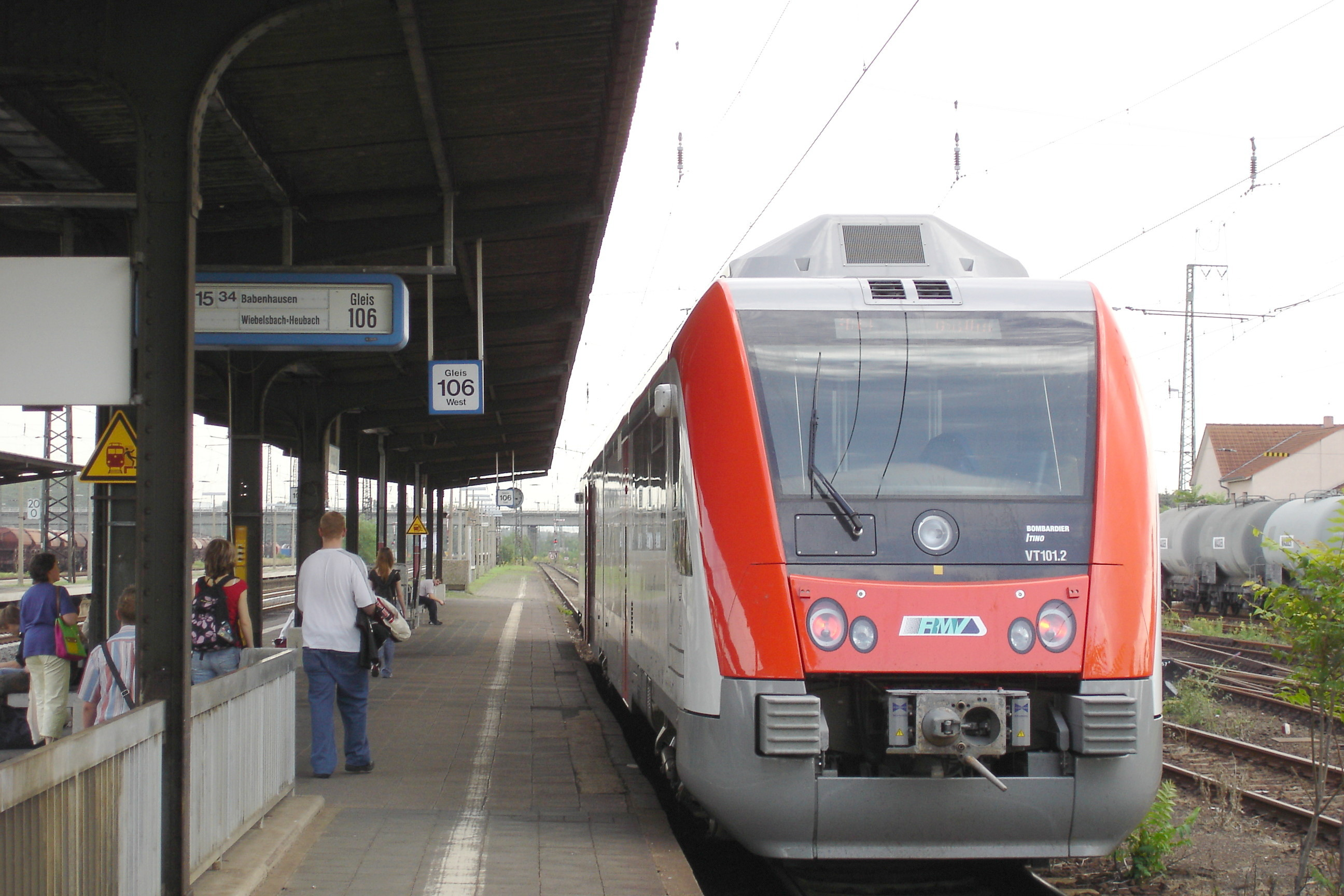
Odenwald Railway service waiting in the station

Hanau station is served by several Regional-Express and Regionalbahn lines. Since 1995 it has also been served by lines S8 and S9 of the Rhine-Main S-Bahn. There is also a central bus station in the station forecourt.

== See also ==
- Rail transport in Germany
- Railway stations in Germany
