= Frankfurt-Mainkur station =

Railway station in Frankfurt, Germany

Frankfurt Mainkur
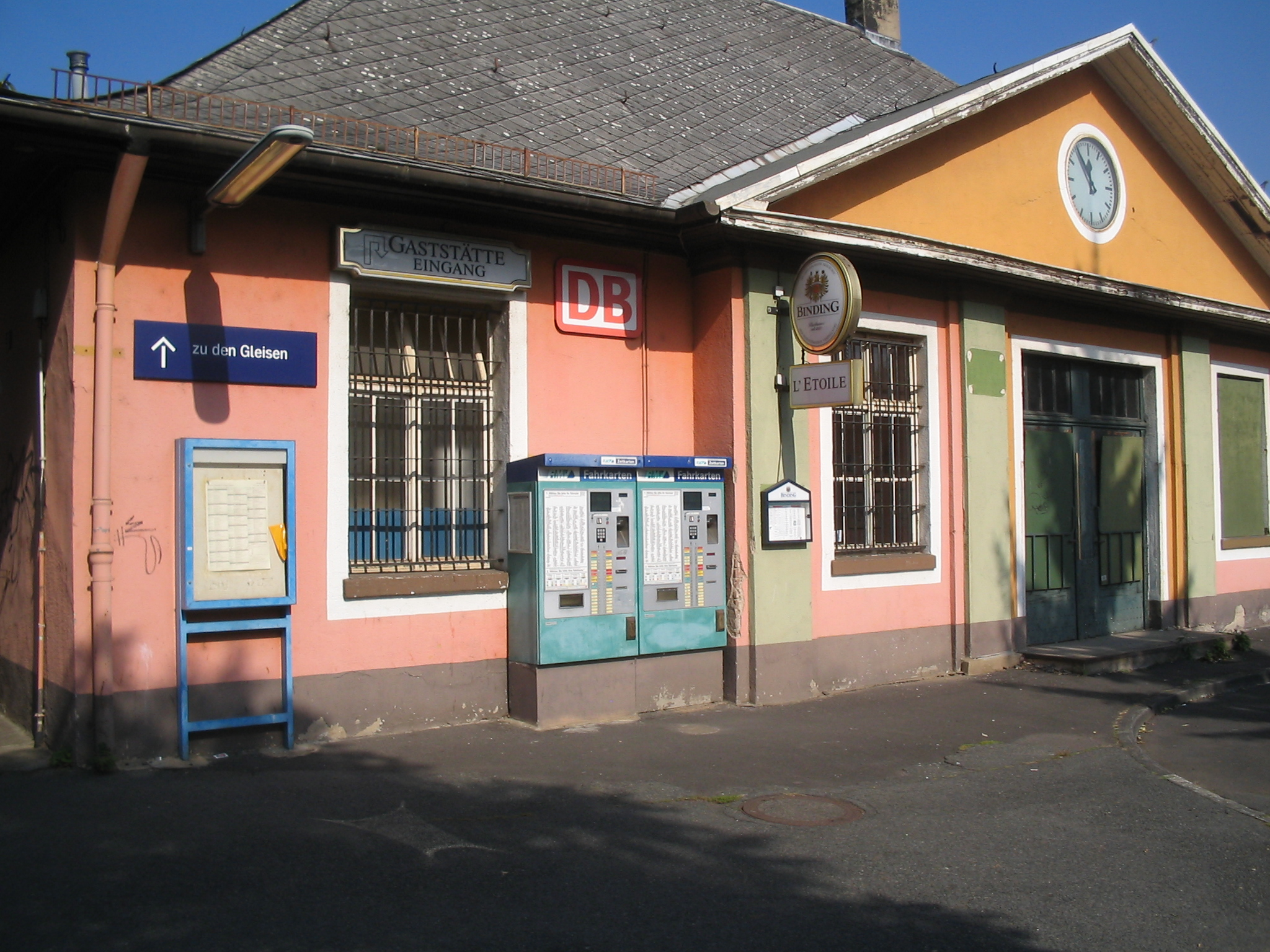
- Station building

General information
- Location: Fechenheim, Hesse; Germany
- Coordinates: 50°8′3″N 8°46′2″E
- Owner: Deutsche Bahn
- Operator: DB Netz; DB Station&Service
- Line: Frankfurt–Maintal–Hanau (7.2 km) (KBS 640, 641)
- Platforms: 3

Construction
- Accessible: No

Other information
- Station code: 1874
- DS100 code: FFMK
- IBNR: 8002048
- Category: 5
- Fare zone: : 5064
- Website: www.bahnhof.de

History
- Opened: 10 November 1848

Services
Preceding station	DB Regio Bayern	Following station
Frankfurt (Main) Ost towards Frankfurt (Main) Hbf	RE 54	Maintal West towards Bamberg
Preceding station	Hessische Landesbahn	Following station
Frankfurt (Main) Ost towards Rüsselsheim Opelwerk	RB 58	Maintal West towards Laufach
Location

Frankfurt-Mainkur station is located on the Frankfurt Süd–Aschaffenburg railway between Frankfurt East station and Hanau Hauptbahnhof in the Frankfurt district of Fechenheim in the German state of Hesse. The station is classified by Deutsche Bahn (DB) as a category 5 station.

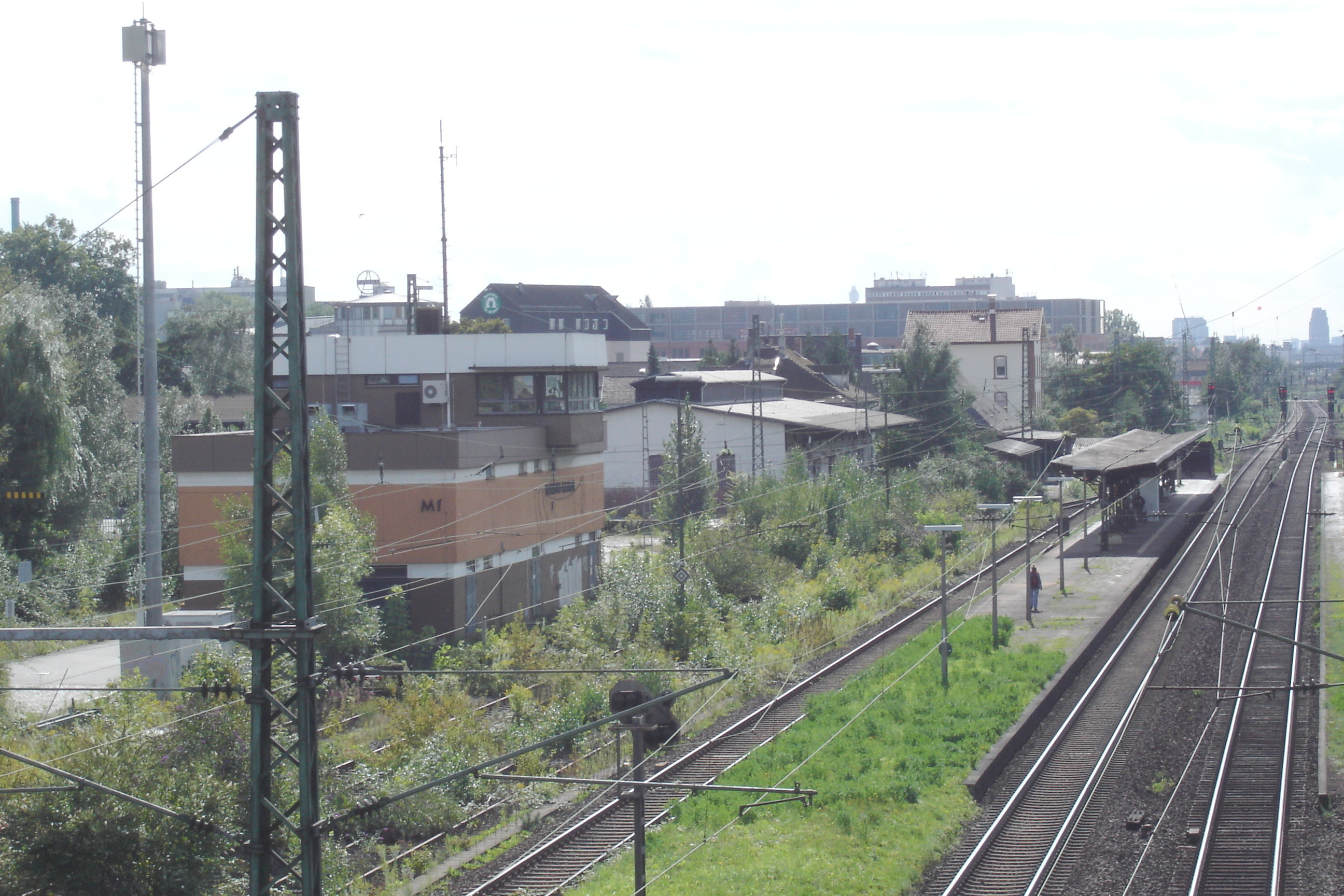
View of the station from the east from Omega bridge over the B 40, rail tracks and Kilianstädter Straße

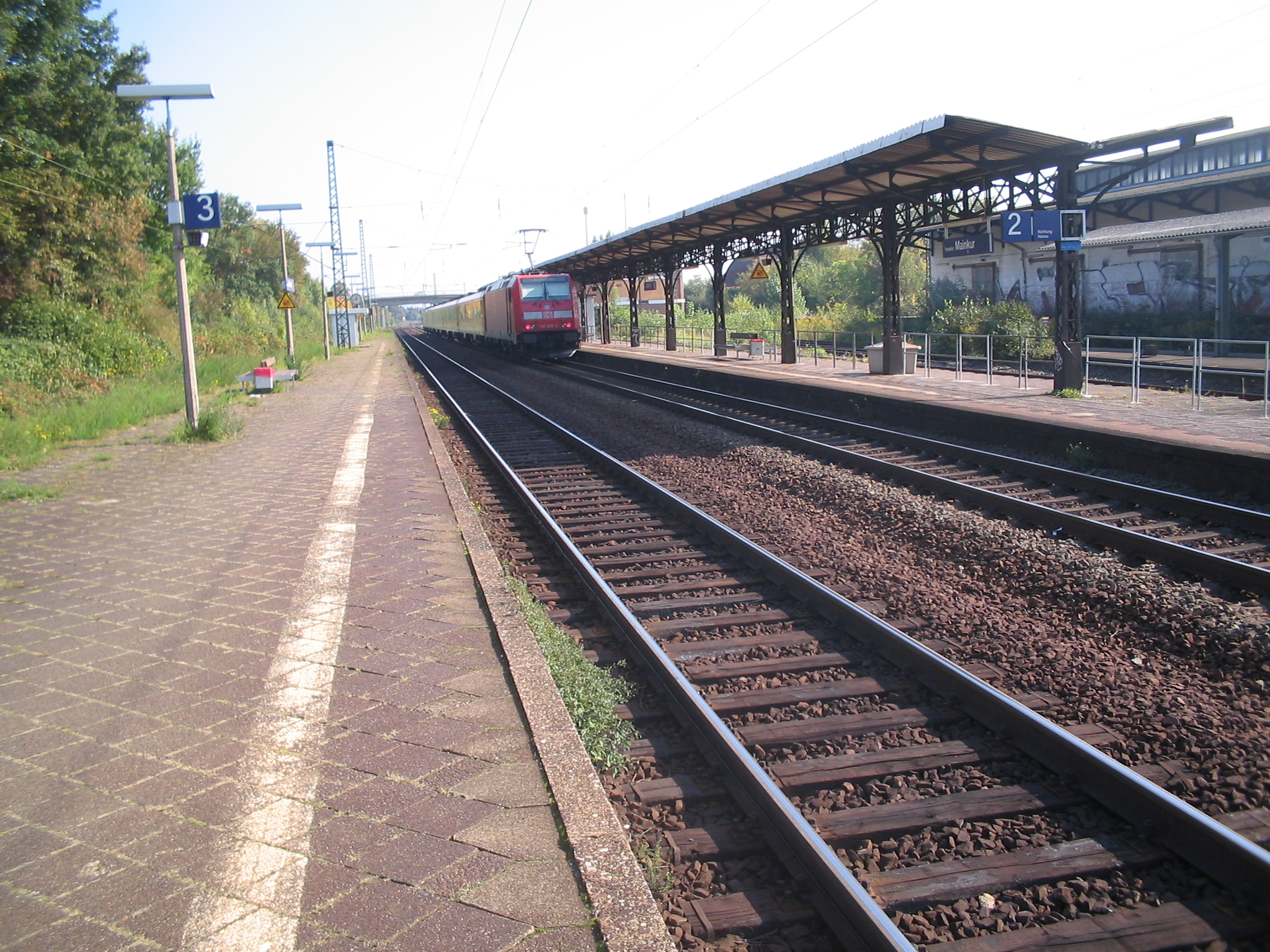
The platforms with Regional-Express service running to Würzburg Hbf

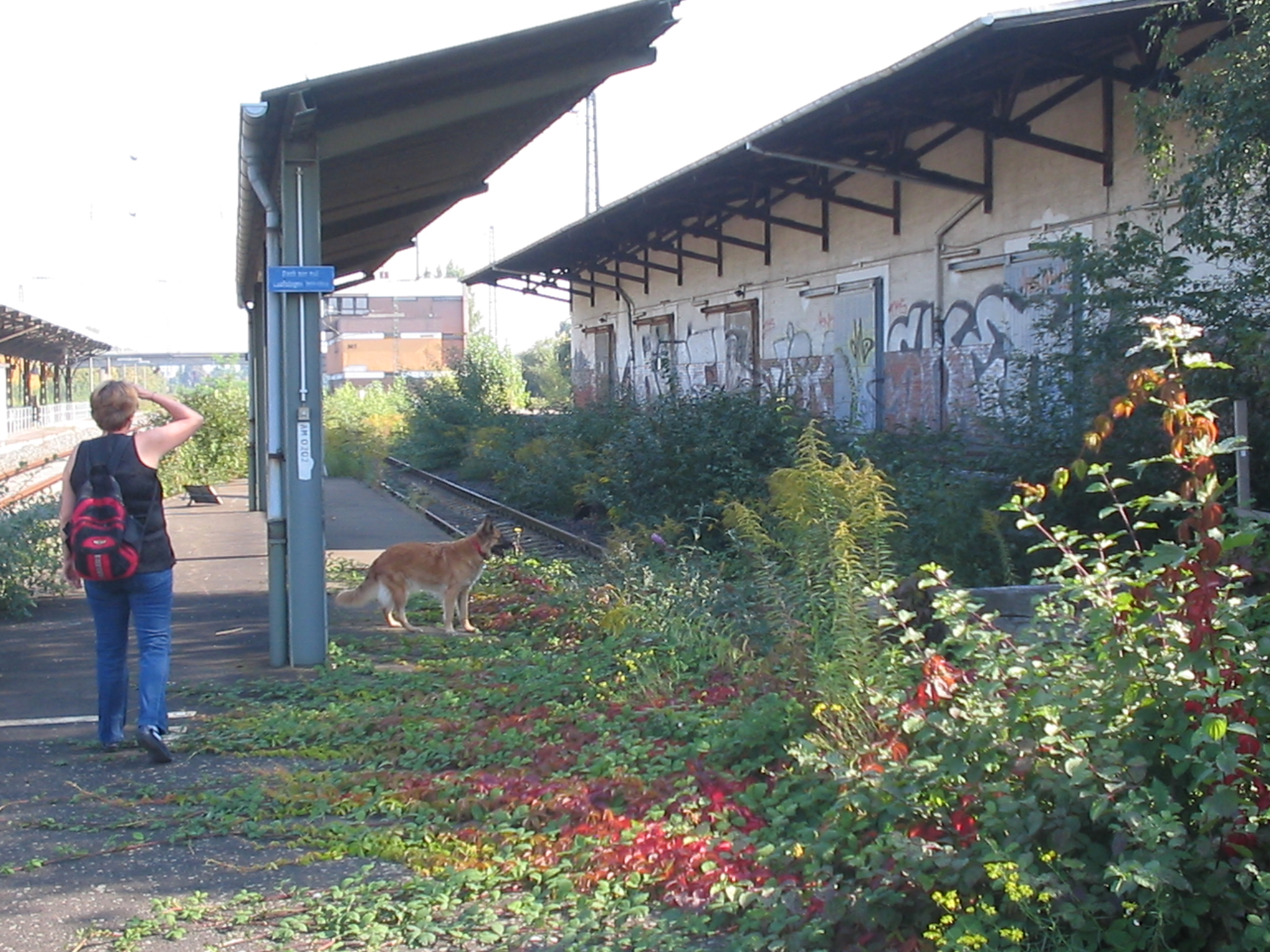
Greenery on the approach to the platform. In background: signal box and road bridge

== Location ==
The station is located on the northern edge of the historic town of Fechenheim, on a street called An der Mainkur, which connects to a set of traffic islands on the Hanauer Landstraße (“Hanau highway”) at the site of the former Main Cur customs house on the border between Frankfurt and the Electorate of Hesse (and earlier the Landgraviate of Hesse-Kassel). This location now has a stop of the Frankfurt tram network. Main Cur is now spelt as Mainkur. The Vilbeler Landstraße (“Vilbel highway”) runs north from the station. It formerly crossed a level crossing immediately west of the station, which is now closed. An underpass, however, allows pedestrian and bicycle traffic to pass under the line.

== History ==
The original station building was opened in 1847 during the construction of the Frankfurt-Hanau Railway. Until the end of the War of 1866, when the Electorate of Hesse and the Free City of Frankfurt were annexed by Prussia, the station was a border station on the border between the two countries with customs clearance. The current station building and freight shed were created between 1913 and 1918.

== Infrastructure ==
Frankfurt-Mainkur station is managed by DB Station&Service. The station building has been closed for years. The main hall is used by the L'Etoile restaurant for art exhibitions. Tickets are available only at the Rhine-Main Transport Association (Rhein-Main-Verkehrsverbund, RMV) machines.

The station has three platform tracks at two platforms, connected with each other by an underground passage. The station is served by Regionalbahn services and less often by Regional-Express line 55 of the RMV from Frankfurt Central Station via Frankfurt South and Frankfurt East to Hanau Central Station, Aschaffenburg Central Station and Würzburg Central Station.

=== Future ===
As part of Deutsche Bahn's extensive station modernisation program (supported by the economic stimulus package), Frankfurt Mainkur station is to be completely renovated and developed.

== Operations ==
South of the station on the Mainkur roundabout on Hanauer Landstraße are the Mainkur Bahnhof tram and bus stops. North of the station are the Birsteiner Straße, Meerholzer Straße and Fuldaer Straße bus stops, which are accessible through the pedestrian underpass that has replaced the Vilbeler Landstraße at this point.

The Mainkur Bahnhof stop is served by tram line 11 and bus routes F-41, 44 (operated by VGF, the Frankfurt municipal transport company), 551, 560 (regional services) and N64 (a night bus route). Birsteiner Straße bus stop is also served by bus routes F-41, 44 and 551; it is also served by routes MKK-23, MKK-25 and MKK-28 of Stadtverkehr Maintal (the Maintal municipal bus company).

The tickets of the RMV can be used on all rail services at Mainkur station. There are several parking lots in front of and next to the station building.
