= Hanau West station =

Railway halt in Hanau, Germany

Hanau West
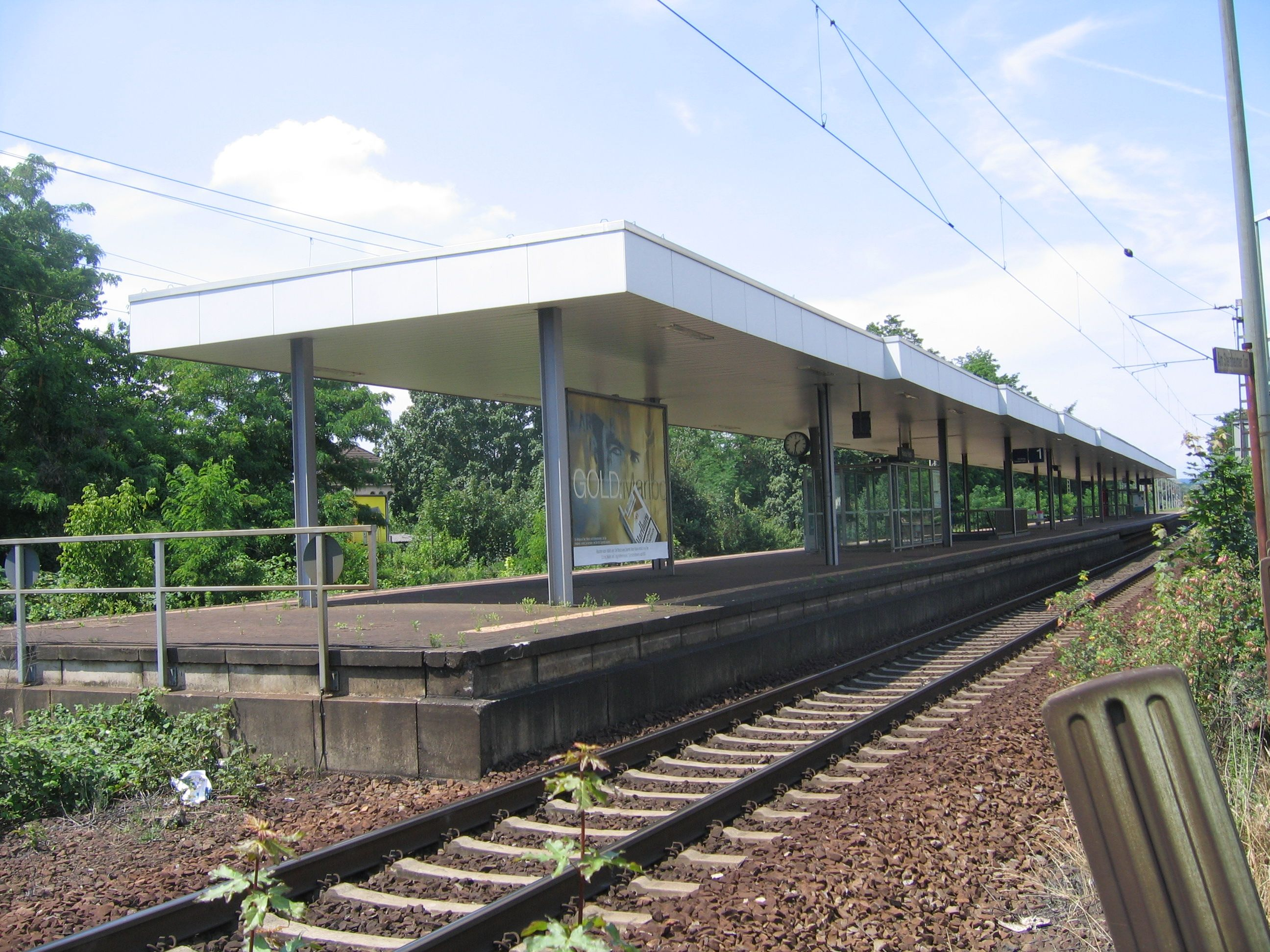
- Hanau West station, looking towards Frankfurt

General information
- Location: Philippsruher Allee 24; Hanau, Hesse; Germany
- Coordinates: 50°7′56″N 8°54′31″E
- Line: Frankfurt–Maintal–Hanau (12.3 km) (KBS 640, 641)
- Platforms: 2

Construction
- Accessible: No
- Architect: Historicist / Neo-Renaissance

Other information
- Station code: 2539
- DS100 code: FHW
- IBNR: 8002573
- Category: 5
- Fare zone: : 3001
- Website: www.bahnhof.de

History
- Opened: 1848

Services
Preceding station	DB Regio Bayern	Following station
Hanau-Wilhelmsbad towards Frankfurt (Main) Hbf	RE 54	Hanau Hbf towards Bamberg
Preceding station	Hessische Landesbahn	Following station
Hanau-Wilhelmsbad towards Rüsselsheim Opelwerk	RB 58	Hanau Hbf towards Laufach
Location
- Location within Hesse

Hanau West station is the oldest station in the city of Hanau in the German state of Hesse. It was opened in 1848 and is located on the 17.9 kilometre mark of the Frankfurt Süd–Aschaffenburg railway. Operationally, since the 1970s it has been classified as a Haltepunkt ("halt"). The station is classified by Deutsche Bahn (DB) as a category 5 station.

== History ==
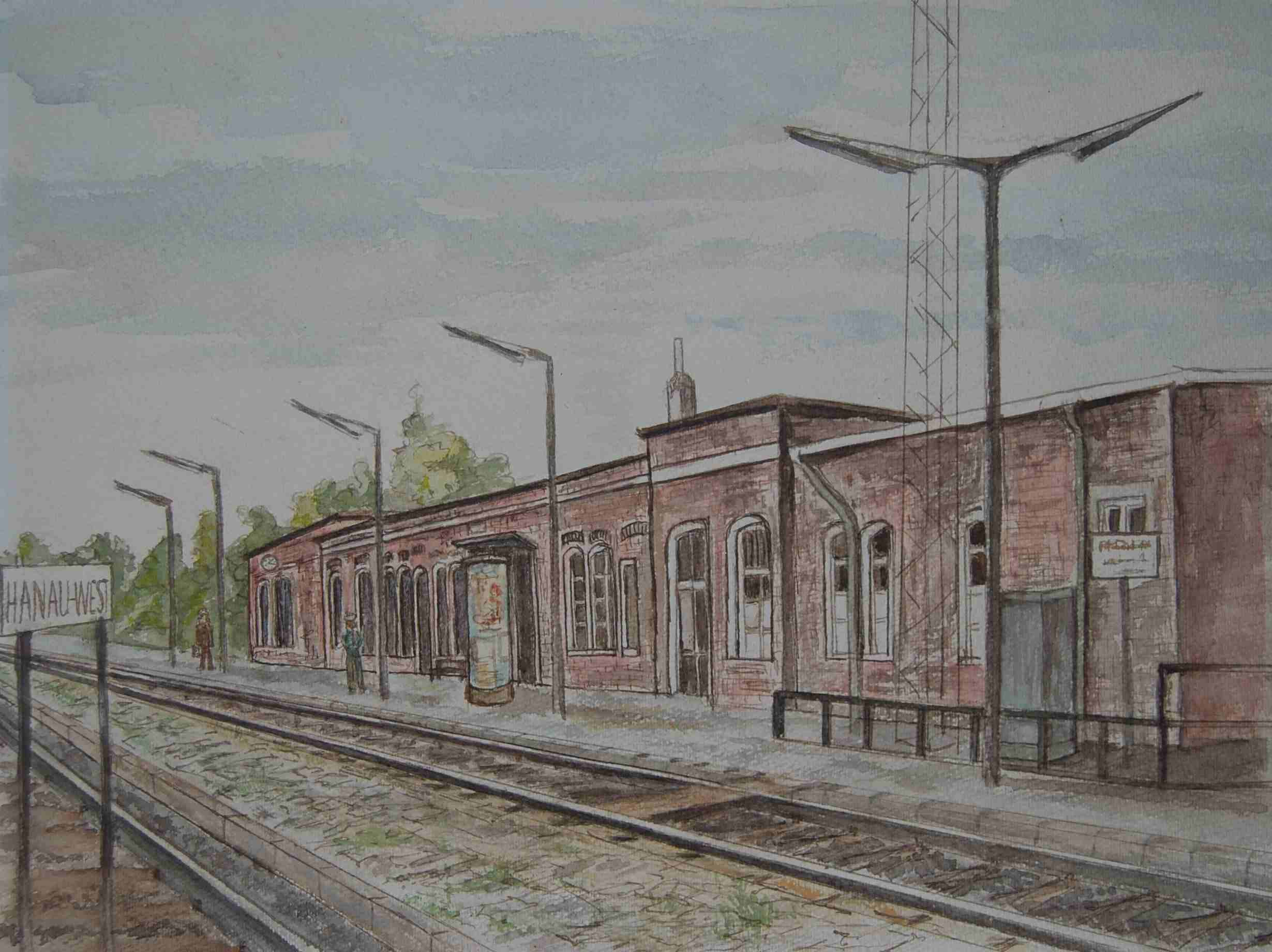
Drawing of the station building designed by Julius Eugen Ruhl, before 1970. The building was on the city side of the track. Looking towards Frankfurt.

The Hanau West station was opened in 1848 as the eastern end and terminus of the Frankfurt-Hanau railway by the Frankfurt-Hanau Railway Company (German: Frankfurt-Hanauer Eisenbahn Gesellschaft, FHE) and was the first station opened in Hanau. It was then on the western edge of Neustadt Hanau (Hanau "new town", a district built from 1597 to house Calvinist refugees from France and the Spanish Netherlands) and was connected directly to Philippsruhe Palace by Philippsruher Allee. The entrance building was designed by the architect Julius Eugen Ruhl, like the station to its immediate west at Wilhelmsbad. The station building stood north of the tracks. The platform tracks were covered with a wooden train shed.

The extension of the Frankfurt-Hanau railway towards Aschaffenburg and its connection to the Ludwig Western Railway in 1854 involved the rebuilding of the station as a through station. Before the building of the line there was a government crisis in Hesse in 1852, because Elector Frederick William expected a bribe of 100,000 thalers from the Bernus du Fay bank before he would sign the appropriate license for the extension of the railway towards Aschaffenburg. The Chief Minister, Ludwig Hassenpflug, offered his resignation, but the elector refused to accept it. Later an iron bridge was built over the railway lines parallel to Philippsruher Allee, which allowed pedestrians to cross the tracks, even when the gates of the Philippsruher Allee level crossing were closed, as was often the case.

After 1862 the Hessian Ludwig Railway (Hessische Ludwigsbahn) took over the Frankfurt-Hanau Railway Company in 1872, including the Frankfurt-Hanau railway and Hanau (West) station. It built a workshop building south of the tracks in the eastern railway station area, east of Philippsruher Allee and the former Main Canal (which connected Neustadt Hanau to the Main river); this workshop still existed between the World Wars, however, it was no longer used for railway purposes. Relics of the first Hanau station long existed north of the tracks, including an unloading facility for local freight and a roundhouse. The site was later used for parking buses operated by Deutsche Bahn and is now used for the buses of Regionalverkehr Kurhessen.

By 1873, the name of the current Hanau West station was changed from Hanau station to Hanau Central Station (Hauptbahnhof). In the same year the Steinheim Main Bridge was built over the Main river for the Frankfurt–Bebra railway. The point where the Frankfurt-Hanau railway and the Frankfurt-Bebra railway crossed was (then) far to the east of the city of Hanau. The station that was built there, Hanau East (now called Hanau Hauptbahnhof) was now more important for railway operations, albeit quite remote for passengers from Hanau. Therefore, Hanau West retained long-distance services for many years. In the national timetable (Reichs-Kursbuch) of 1914, the last peacetime issue before the First World War, the station is listed as Hanau West (Stadt) ('"city"). From 1908 to 1928, Hanau West station was served by the trams of Hanauer Straßenbahn (Hanau Tramways). Since 1928, the station has only been connected by bus services.

Once the Second World War was over, damage to the entrance building was repaired. However, it was demolished for the construction of an underpass for Philippsruher Allee in the 1970s along with the freight shed. It was replaced by a single central platform built on the new bridge over the underpass.

== Operations ==
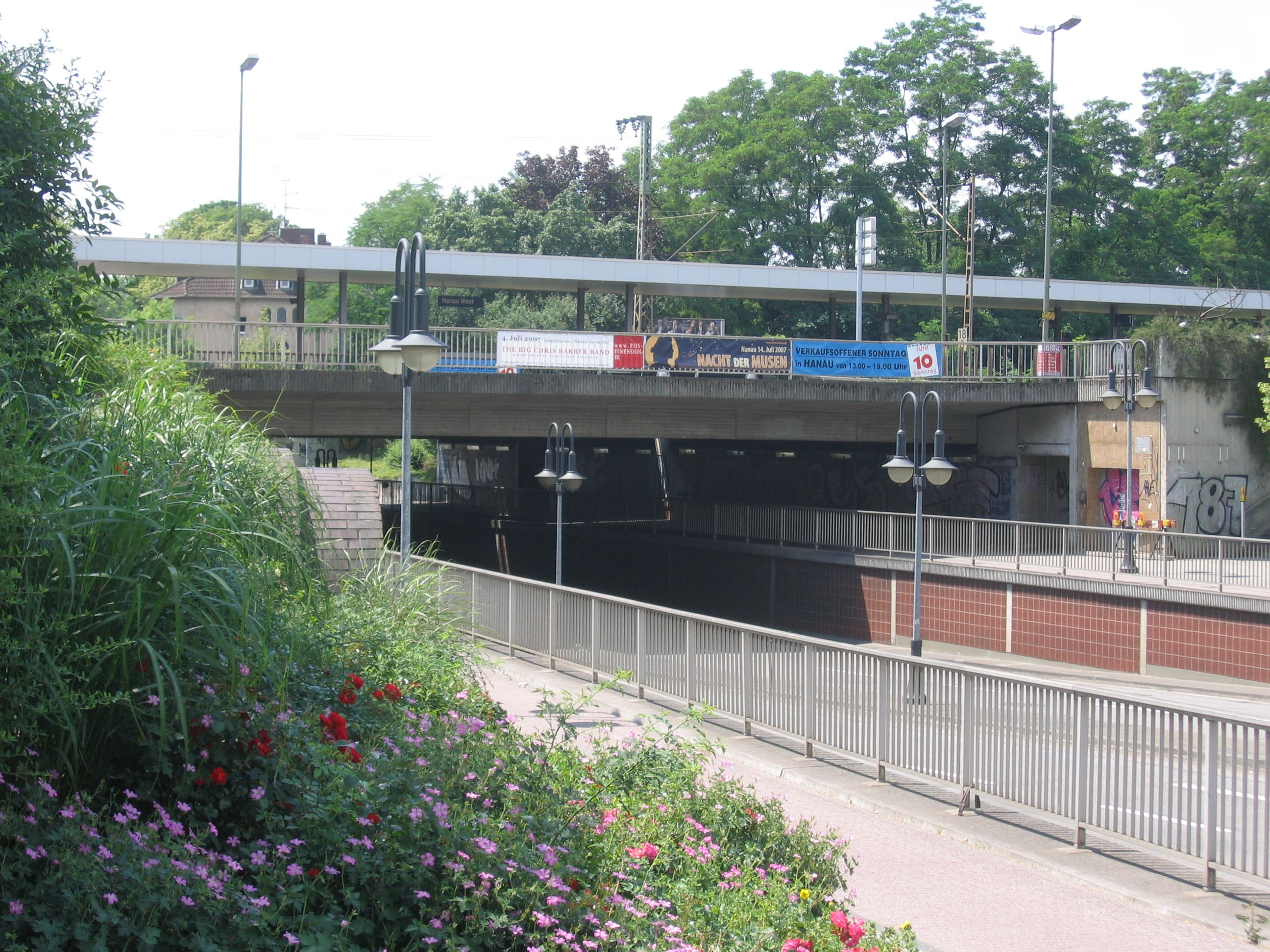
Hanau West station

Currently, Hanau West station is served by Regionalbahn services operated under the framework of the Rhine-Main Transport Association (Rhein-Main-Verkehrsverbund, RMV) and operated by Hessische Landesbahn. Since 14 December 2008, a train operated by VIAS GmbH stops in the afternoon at Hanau West on its way from Frankfurt to Groß-Umstadt Wiebelsbach. There are also connections with the buses of Hanauer Straßenbahn AG, which is also part of the RMV network. The services offered by the station are rather minimalist, which are not likely to attract passengers to use it, particularly in bad weather.

== Future ==
Under the proposed North Main S-Bahn from Frankfurt via Maintal to Hanau Central Station, two new tracks would be built south of the existing tracks from the west to Hanau West station. The eastern exit towards Hanau Central Station would only have three tracks, since there is not enough room for four tracks between the existing buildings and the road. With the development of the western part of the inner city, Hanau West station would regain some of its former importance.
