= Maintal Ost station =

Railway station in Maintal, Germany

Maintal Ost
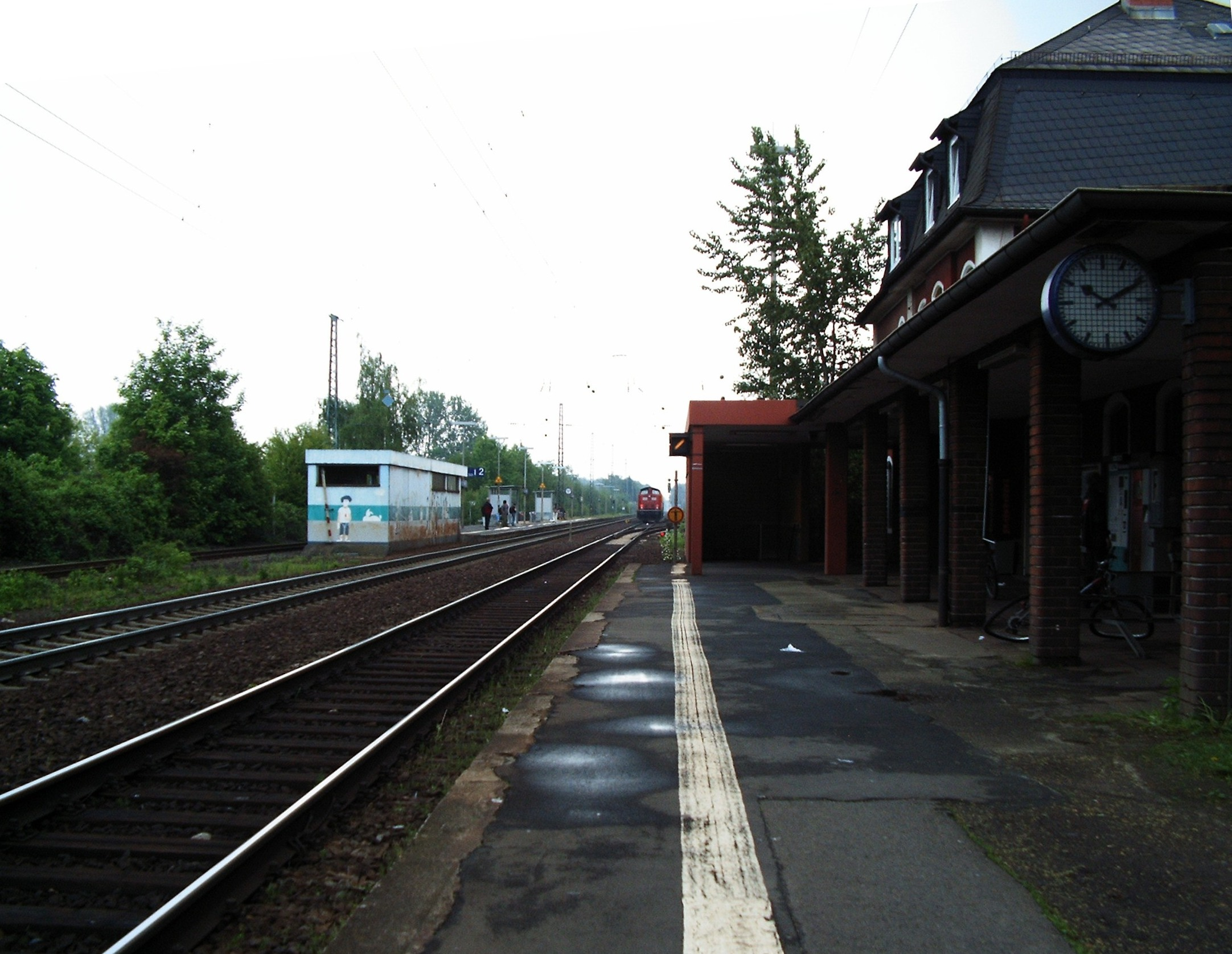
- Maintal Ost station, platform 1 in the foreground, 2 and 3 in the background

General information
- Location: Bahnhofstr. 127, Maintal, Hesse; Germany
- Coordinates: 50°08′32″N 8°50′06″E
- Owner: Deutsche Bahn
- Operator: DB Station&Service
- Line: Frankfurt–Maintal–Hanau (12.3 km) (KBS 640, 641)
- Platforms: 3

Construction
- Accessible: Platform 1

Other information
- Station code: 2809
- DS100 code: FHD
- IBNR: 8002877
- Category: 4
- Fare zone: : 2901
- Website: www.bahnhof.de

History
- Opened: Prior to 1858

Services
Preceding station	DB Regio Bayern	Following station
Maintal West towards Frankfurt (Main) Hbf	RE 54	Hanau-Wilhelmsbad towards Bamberg
Preceding station	Hessische Landesbahn	Following station
Frankfurt (Main) Ost towards Frankfurt Airport regional	RE 59	Hanau Hbf towards Bamberg
Maintal West towards Rüsselsheim Opelwerk	RB 58	Hanau-Wilhelmsbad towards Laufach
Location
- Location within Hesse Location within Germany Location within Europe

Maintal Ost (east) is a station in the network of the Rhine-Main Transport Association (German: Rhein-Main-Verkehrsverbund, RMV) on the Frankfurt Süd–Aschaffenburg railway, serving the Maintal districts of Hochstadt and Dörnigheim in the German state of Hesse. The station is classified by Deutsche Bahn (DB) as a category 4 station.

== Location ==
The Regionalbahn station is at a centrally located and easily accessible location between Hochstadt and Dörnigheim: in the south from Hochstadt and in the north from Dörnigheim.

== History ==
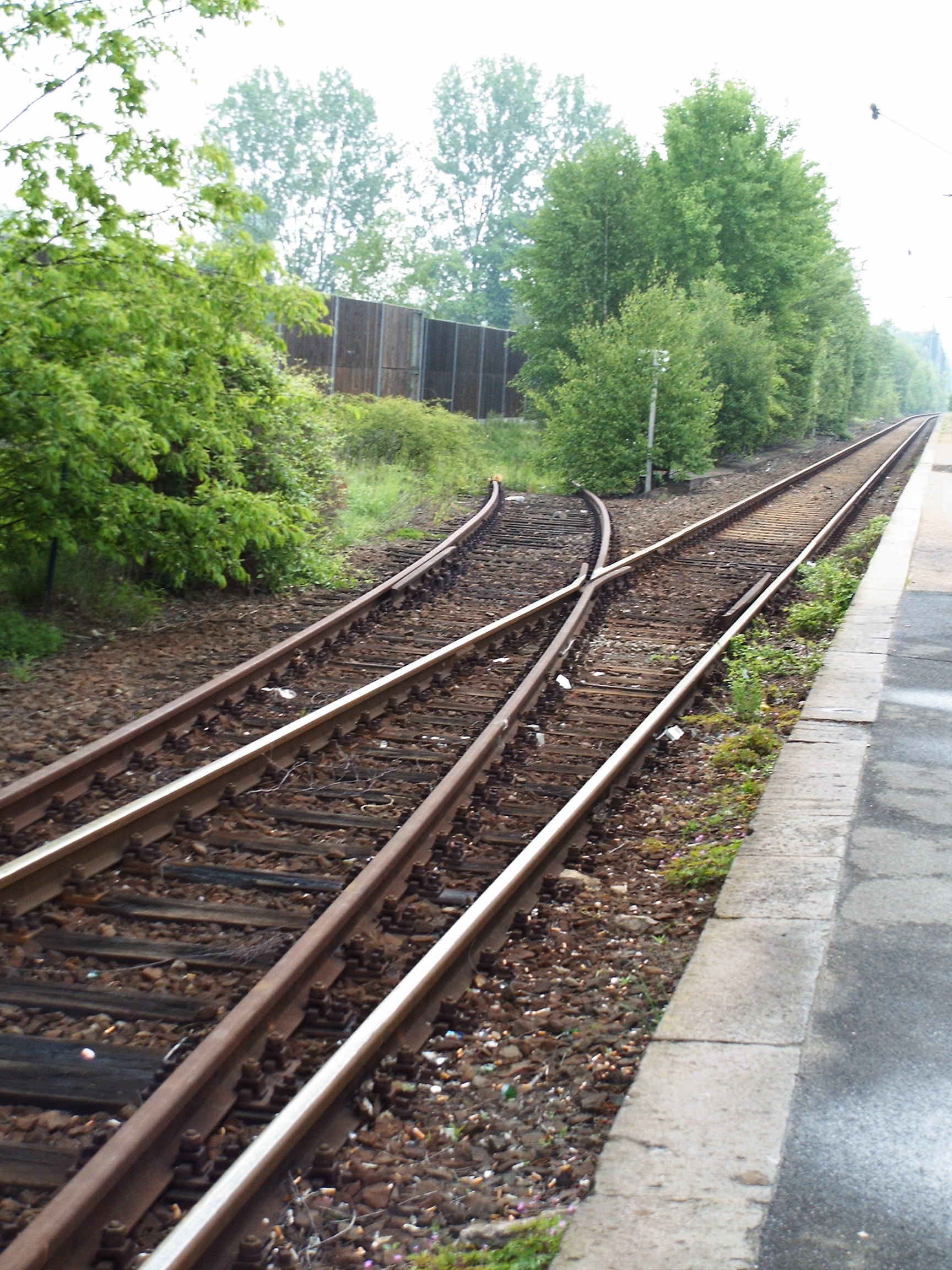
Siding to the former Kling factory from track 3 (dismantled at the end of 2010)

On 10 June 1848, the Frankfurt-Hanau railway was opened by the Frankfurt-Hanau Railway Company (Frankfurt-Hanauer Eisenbahn Gesellschaft, FHE), but at that time there was no station at the current location. Like the neighbouring Rumpenheim station (later Bischofsheim-Rumpenheim and now Maintal West), the former Hochstadt–Dörnigheim station (now Maintal Ost) was built by 1858.

== Infrastructure ==
The station now consists of four tracks, but two of them are passing loops, which are not used for scheduled trains.

When the station handled freight, there were a total of six tracks, supplemented by several sidings. It mainly served Furnierwerk Kling, which was demolished in 1998, and the Intu-Bau company.

For passenger transport, there are now three platforms on the two main tracks and a passing loop to the north. The station building is located on the south side but is no longer used for passengers. It is rented out for events. Tickets for travel in the RMV area and for long-distance services on Deutsche Bahn are available from vending machines. There are free park and ride spaces on both the Hochstadt and the Dörnigheim sides. In addition, there is taxi parking on the Dörnigheim side.

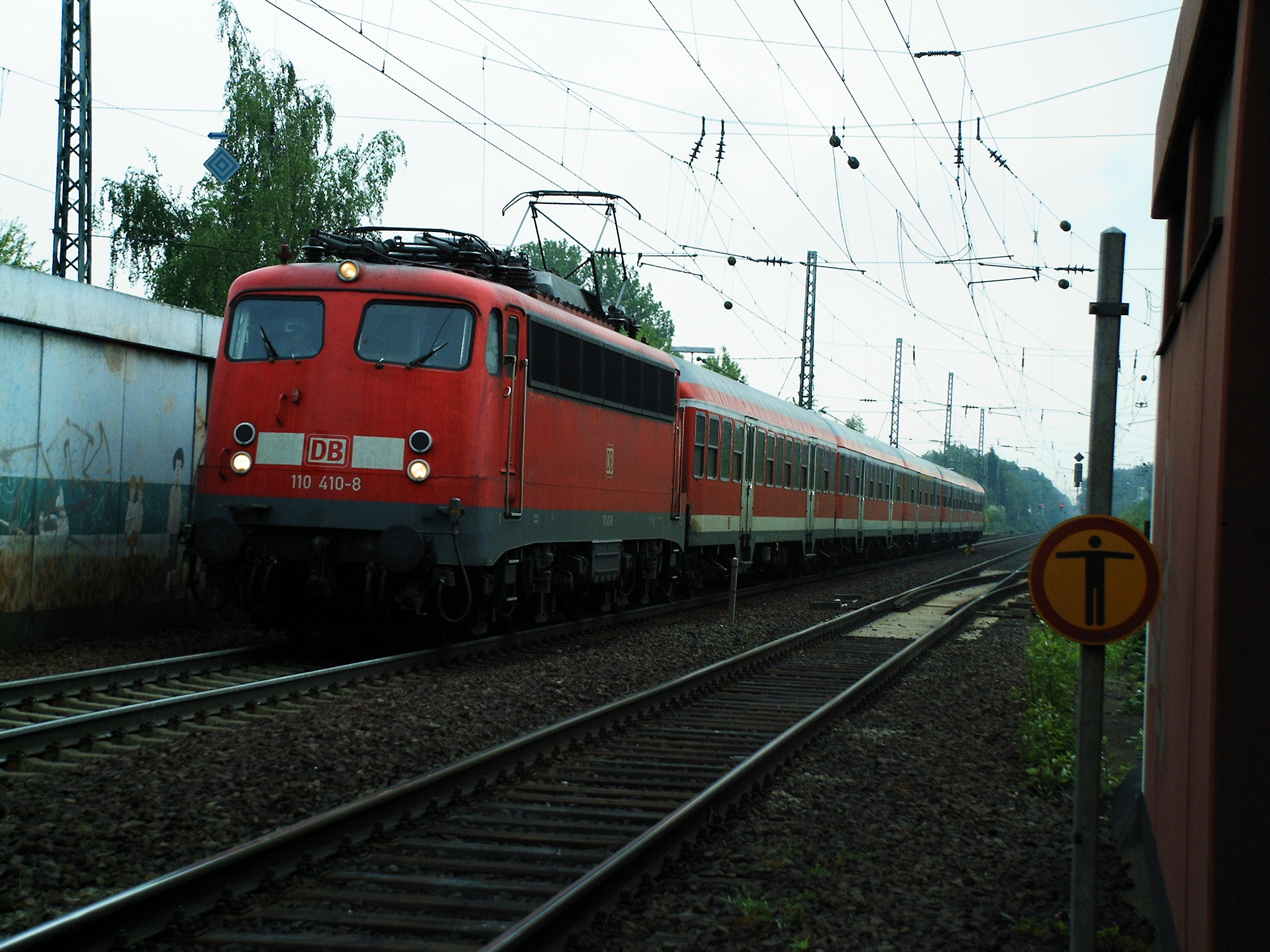
RB 55 at platform 2 (towards Frankfurt)

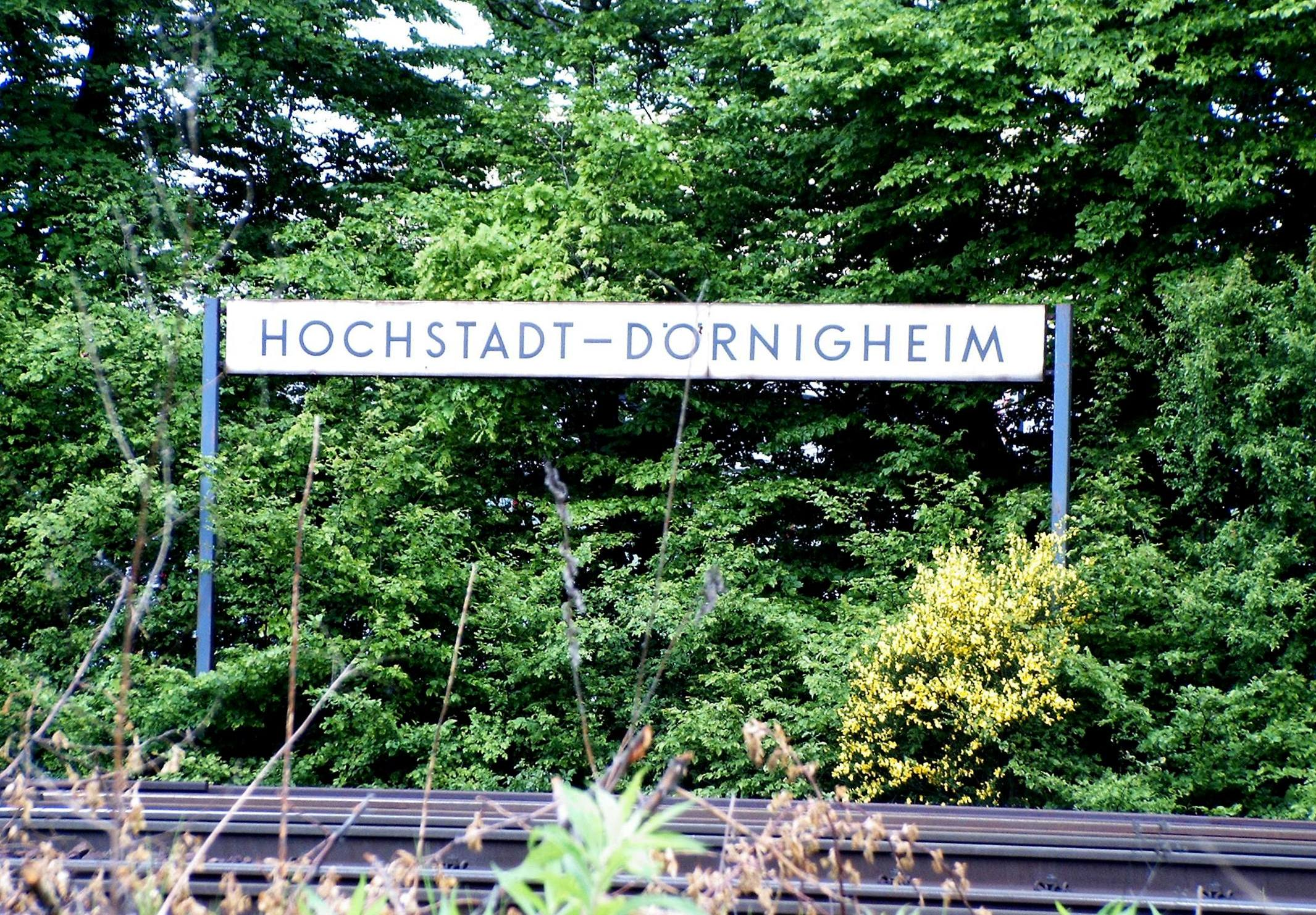
Old station sign near Eichenheege level crossing

== Operations ==
On weekdays, trains run every half hour from 5 AM to 9 PM, and hourly on weekends, except on Saturday mornings, when they run every half hour. There are Regionalbahn and Regional-Express services operated by DB Regio and services operated by VIAS, all running between Frankfurt South station and Hanau Central Station. Some trains run west from/to Frankfurt Central Station or Frankfurt Airport and in the east from/to Aschaffenburg, Würzburg, Nuremberg, Groß-Umstadt Wiebelsbach and Bad Soden-Salmünster. At peak times trains run more frequently than every half hour.

Scheduled trains run on track 1 (towards Hanau ) and track 2 (towards Frankfurt). Trains to Frankfurt stop on track 3 when overtaking delayed trains.

=== Buses ===
On the south side of the station, in Dörnigheim, is the bus station, which is served by routes 22 and 23 to Hochstadt, Dörnigheim, Wachenbuchen and to Enkheim U-Bahn station in Frankfurt-Bergen-Enkheim.
