= Maintal West station =

Railweay Station in Hesse, Germany

Maintal West

General information
- Location: Bruno-Dressler-Straße/Am Kreuzstein; 63477 Maintal; Hesse; Germany
- Coordinates: 50°08′27″N 8°48′17″E
- System: Hp
- Owner: Deutsche Bahn
- Operator: DB Station&Service
- Lines: Frankfurt–Hanau railway (KBS 640)
- Platforms: 2 side platforms
- Tracks: 2
- Train operators: DB Regio Bayern; Hessische Landesbahn

Construction
- Parking: yes
- Cycle facilities: yes
- Accessible: partly

Other information
- Station code: 669
- DS100 code: FBMR
- IBNR: 8000996
- Category: 5
- Fare zone: : 2909
- Website: www.bahnhof.de

Services
Preceding station	DB Regio Bayern	Following station
Frankfurt-Mainkur towards Frankfurt (Main) Hbf	RE 54	Maintal Ost towards Bamberg
Preceding station	Hessische Landesbahn	Following station
Frankfurt-Mainkur towards Rüsselsheim Opelwerk	RB 58	Maintal Ost towards Laufach
Location
- Location within Hesse Location within Germany Location within Europe

Maintal West station is a railway station in the municipality of Maintal, located in the Main-Kinzig-Kreis in Hesse, Germany.
