= Hanau-Wilhelmsbad station =

Railway station in Hanau, Germany

Hanau Wilhelmsbad
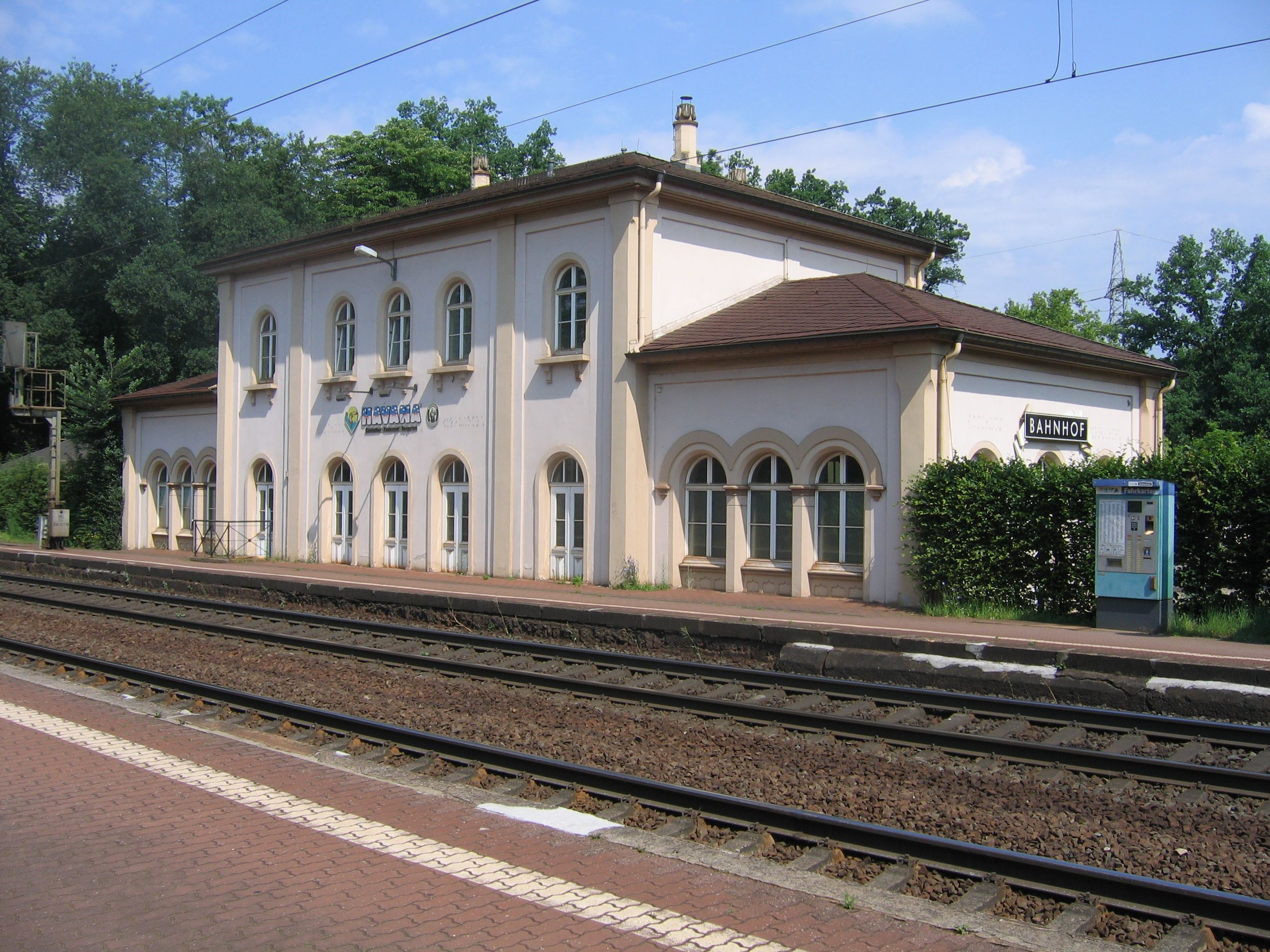
- Entrance building, track side

General information
- Location: Burgallee 18, Hanau, Hesse; Germany
- Coordinates: 50°08′38″N 8°53′01″E
- Owner: Deutsche Bahn
- Operator: DB Netz; DB Station&Service
- Line: Frankfurt–Hanau
- Platforms: 2

Construction
- Accessible: Yes
- Architect: Julius Eugen Ruhl

Other information
- Station code: 2539
- DS100 code: FHWB
- IBNR: 8002574
- Category: 5
- Fare zone: : 3001
- Website: www.bahnhof.de

History
- Opened: 10 September 1848; 177 years ago

Services
Preceding station	DB Regio Bayern	Following station
Maintal Ost towards Frankfurt (Main) Hbf	RE 54	Hanau West towards Bamberg
Preceding station	Hessische Landesbahn	Following station
Maintal Ost towards Rüsselsheim Opelwerk	RB 58	Hanau West towards Laufach
Location

Hanau-Wilhelmsbad station is a former Fürstenbahnhof ("Prince's station") and a current halt ("Haltepunkt") on the Frankfurt Süd–Aschaffenburg railway in Hanau in the German state of Hesse.

== Function ==
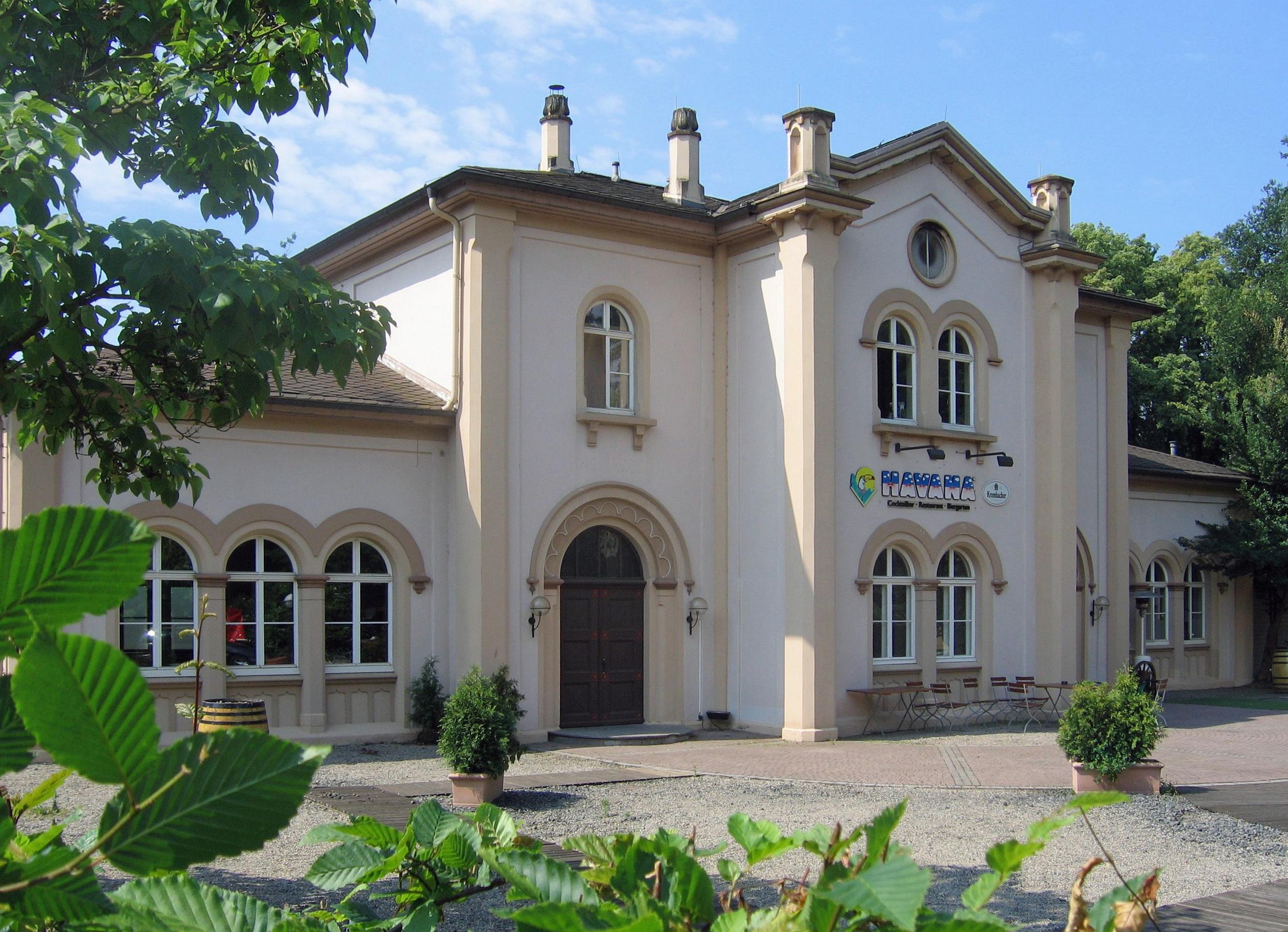
Entrance building, street side

The station was built in the immediate vicinity of the former Wilhelmsbad spa (which its name refers to) and served the excursion traffic to it. Shortly after its opening, up to 16,000 people would arrive by train on public holidays with good weather. Today the station is used by many commuters due to its large parking area. Patronage at the station is low outside the peak hour. It has two outside platforms, which are connected only by the adjacent Burgallee level crossing. Furthermore, the station serves the nearby Herbert Dröse Stadion (American football stadium).

== Entrance building ==
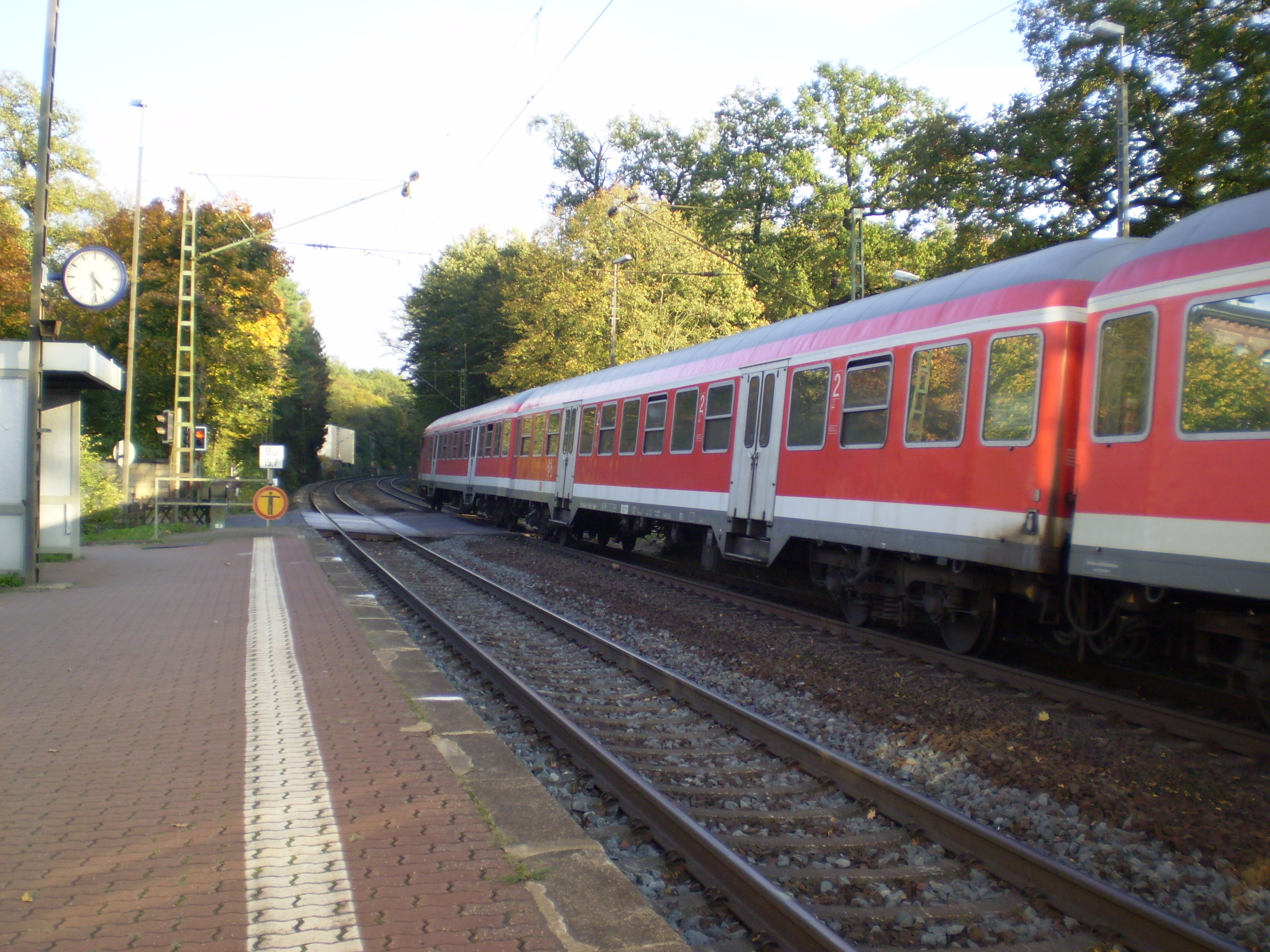
Regionalbahn service in Wilhelmsbad

The entrance building is one of the oldest surviving in Hesse. It was put into operation on 10 September 1848. It was designed by Julius Eugen Ruhl. He placed it directly at the intersection of Hochstädter Landstraße with the Burgallee, the connection between the Park Wilhelmsbad and the Baroque palace of Schloss Philippsruhe, which was the residence of the Count of Hanau when the station was established. The station building was therefore equipped with a Fürstenzimmer (prince's room), which occupied the central part on the ground floor of the entrance building, as a waiting area for the "highest and most supreme rulers". In the 1990s, the building was privatised and has since been used for a restaurant. The entrance building is listed as a cultural monument under the Hessian monument protection law. Today it is included with the architectural ensemble of the park of Wilhelmsbad.

== Planning ==
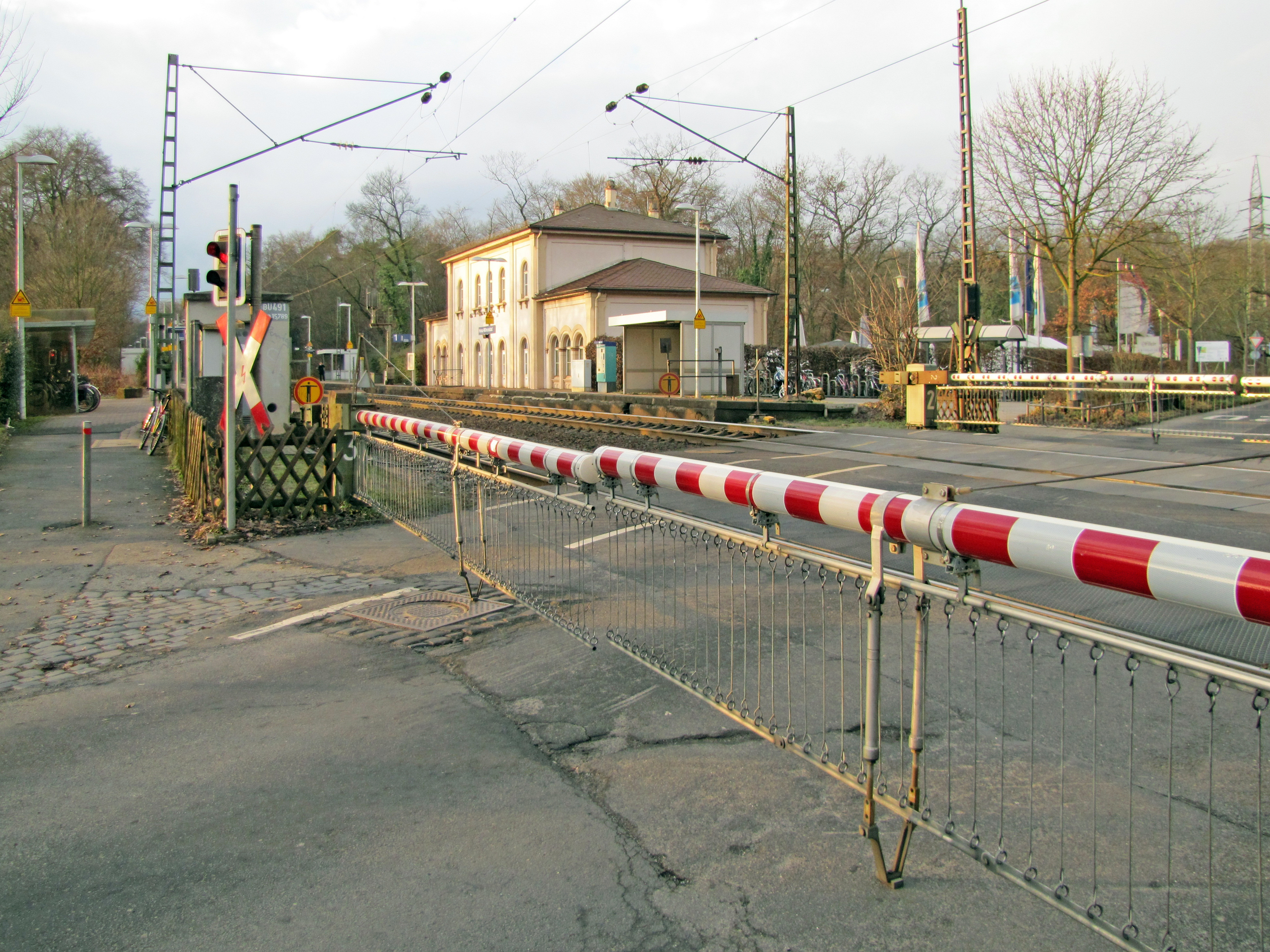
Level crossing and entrance building

The level crossing where Burgallee still crosses the busy mainline is an obstacle both for railway operations and for road traffic. It is to be eliminated during the development of the North Main S-Bahn. However, it is not known when this project will proceed, although plans for it date back to the 1970s. As a result of the strong inclination of the tracks due to the curve, there have been numerous collisions with motor vehicles.
