= Frankfurt (Main) Ost station =

Railway halt in Frankfurt, Germany

Frankfurt (Main) Ost
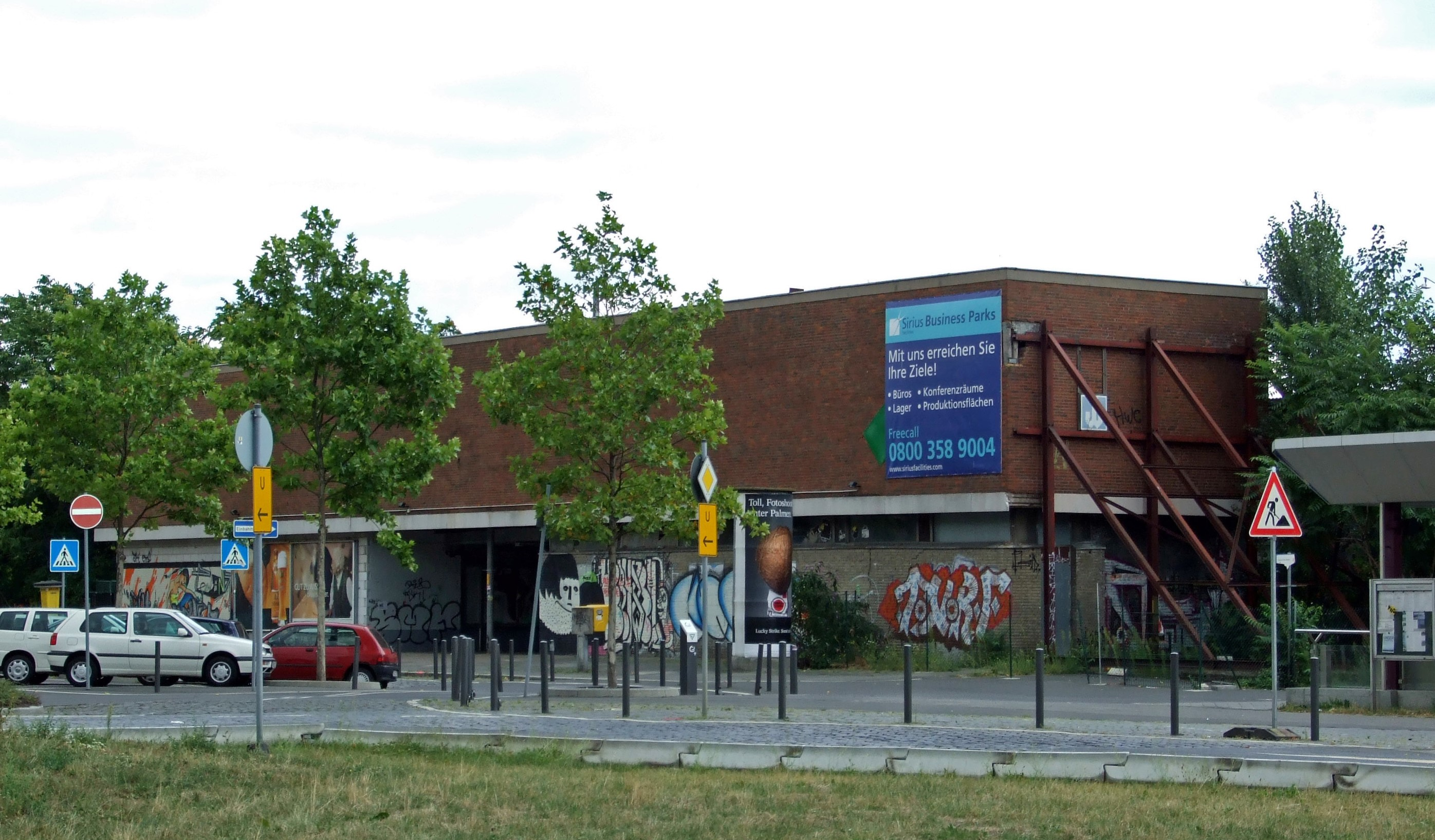
- East Station entrance building, now demolished

General information
- Location: Danziger Platz 6, Frankfurt, Hesse; Germany
- Coordinates: 50°06′46″N 8°42′29″E
- Owner: Deutsche Bahn
- Operator: DB Netz; DB Station&Service
- Line: Frankfurt–Hanau (KBS 640)
- Platforms: 3 main line; 2 U-Bahn

Construction
- Accessible: No
- Architect: Karl Radlbeck

Other information
- Station code: 1852
- DS100 code: FFO
- IBNR: 8002039
- Category: 5
- Fare zone: : 5001
- Website: www.bahnhof.de

History
- Opened: 10 March 1913

Services
Preceding station	DB Regio Bayern	Following station
Frankfurt (Main) Süd towards Frankfurt (Main) Hbf	RE 54	Frankfurt-Mainkur towards Bamberg
Preceding station	Hessische Landesbahn	Following station
Frankfurt (Main) Süd towards Frankfurt Airport regional	RE 59	Maintal Ost towards Bamberg
Frankfurt (Main) Süd towards Rüsselsheim Opelwerk	RB 58	Frankfurt-Mainkur towards Laufach
Preceding station	Frankfurt U-Bahn	Following station
Zoo towards Hausen	U6	Terminus
Location

Frankfurt (Main) East station (German: Bahnhof Frankfurt (Main) Ost or Frankfurt Ostbahnhof) serves regional rail services in the Ostend district of Frankfurt, Germany. Its container terminal is one of the two remaining freight yards in the city (the other is Industriepark Höchst), after the much larger Frankfurt central freight yard (Hauptgüterbahnhof) was closed. The freight yard of Frankfurt's eastern river port also lies to the east.

== History ==
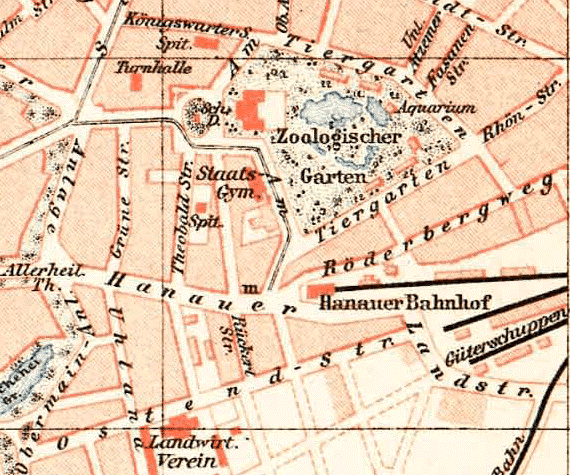
Former nearby Hanau Station (Hanauer Bahnhof)

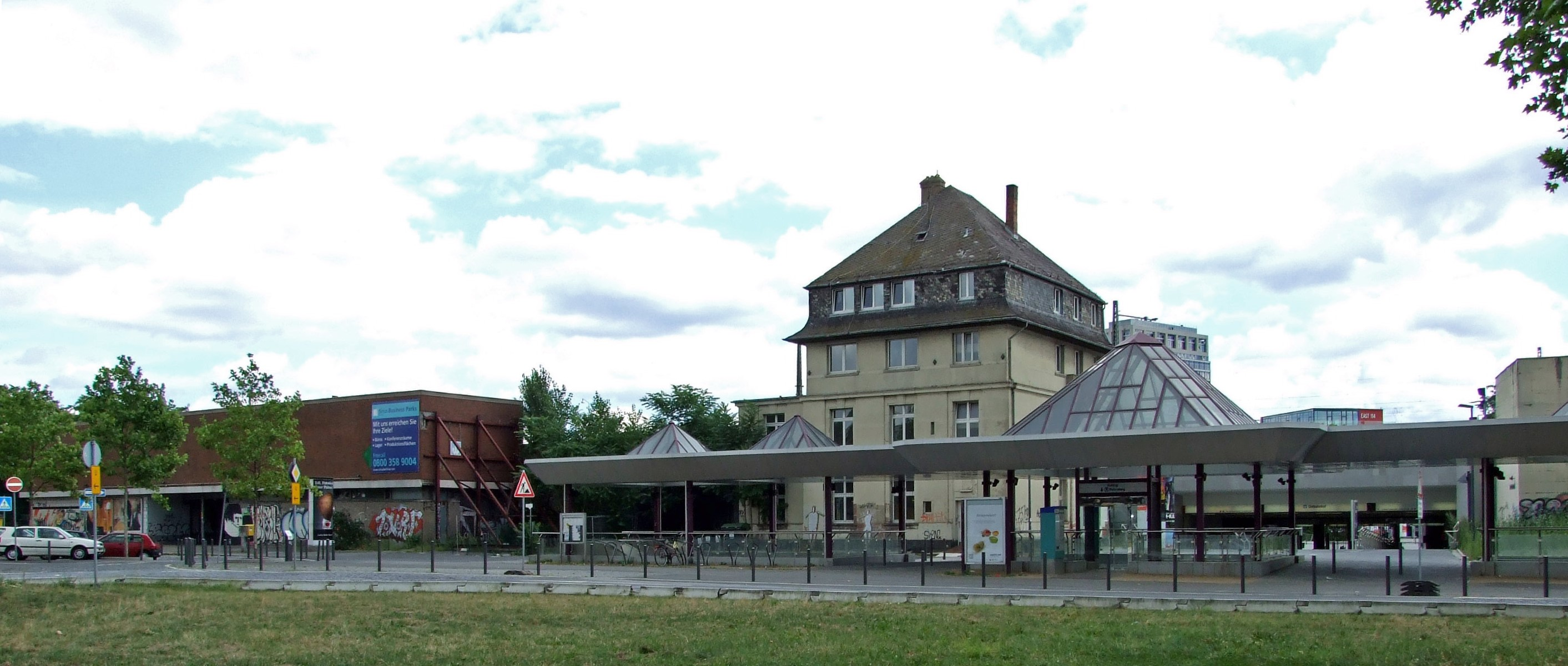
Mainline and U-Bahn station

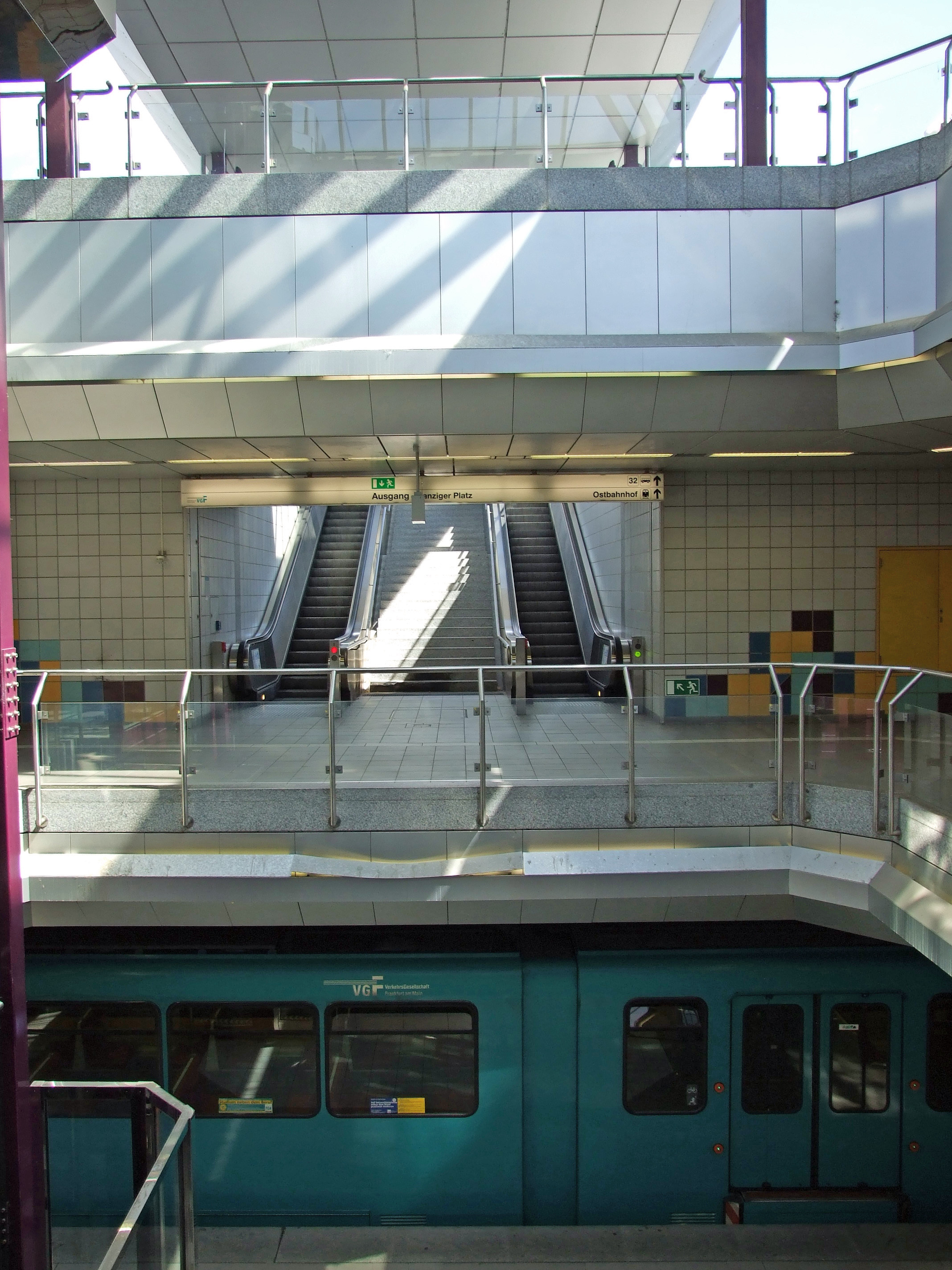
Three levels of U-Bahn station

Until the opening of the East station, trains coming from Hanau finished their journeys at a terminal station between the streets of Röderbergweg, Zobelstraße and Hanauer Landstraße, south of the zoo. It was opened on 10 September 1848 by the Frankfurt-Hanau Railway as Hanau station (Hanauer Bahnhof). The line and station were taken over by the Hessian Ludwig Railway in 1872, which was taken over by the Prussian state railways in 1897.

Today's East station was officially opened by the Prussian state railways on 10 March 1913. Freight operations, however, began only on 1 April and passenger services in May 1913. The original station building of 1914 with its huge hall was burnt in World War II and 60% destroyed. A temporary station was opened to serve its 10,000 daily commuters and freight trains.

In 1961, a sober purpose-built station in the style of the 1960s was built using the corridors and basements of the old buildings. Its design by Karl Radlbeck ignored the grand design of the previous station and replaced it with a rectangular building, with a large boxy roof adorned only with an illuminated DB sign and a clock. This building became dilapidated. The demolition of the buildings to build a new hotel began in October 2022 and was completed by January 2023.

=== U-Bahn station ===
On 29 May 1999, the station on U-Bahn line U6 was opened. This is a short branch from Zoo station off the Ostend branch of U-Bahn line C, which is operated as line U7. The underground station is in partly under Danziger Platz and partly under the main line station, south of the station building. The axis of the U-Bahn station crosses the main line station; a long-planned extension would pass under the Frankfurt-Hanau line and run east of it along Hanauer Landstraße. Originally the station platform was only 75 metres long, instead of the normal 105 metres on the U-Bahn, allowing the operation of trains with a maximum of three carriages. In 2001 construction began for the extension of the platforms to 105 metres, which was completed on 26 April 2007, allowing the unrestricted use of four-car trains. At the same time a new pedestrian link was built and a new Ostbahnhof/Honsellstraße station was opened for trams and buses.

== Operations ==
=== Passenger ===
The importance of the station for passengers has been greatly reduced, as most trains to the east use the route over the south Main route via Offenbach. Regional trains to and from Hanau and Regional-Express trains between Würzburg and Frankfurt stop at Frankfurt East.

Until December 1990 it was an important station for the United States Armed Forces. Rolling stock of the Berlin Duty Train, using sleeper cars and one crew car per train, were stored at this location during the day and then moved to the Frankfurt/Main Hauptbahnhof to pick up passengers for the evening departures to Berlin-Lichterfeld West and, later that night, Bremerhaven. By the early 1980s, service to Bremerhaven was dropped, leaving only trains on the Frankfurt/Main-Berlin Lichterfeld West and Bremerhaven-Berlin-Lichterfeld West routes, until the complete end of service in December 1990.

=== Freight traffic ===
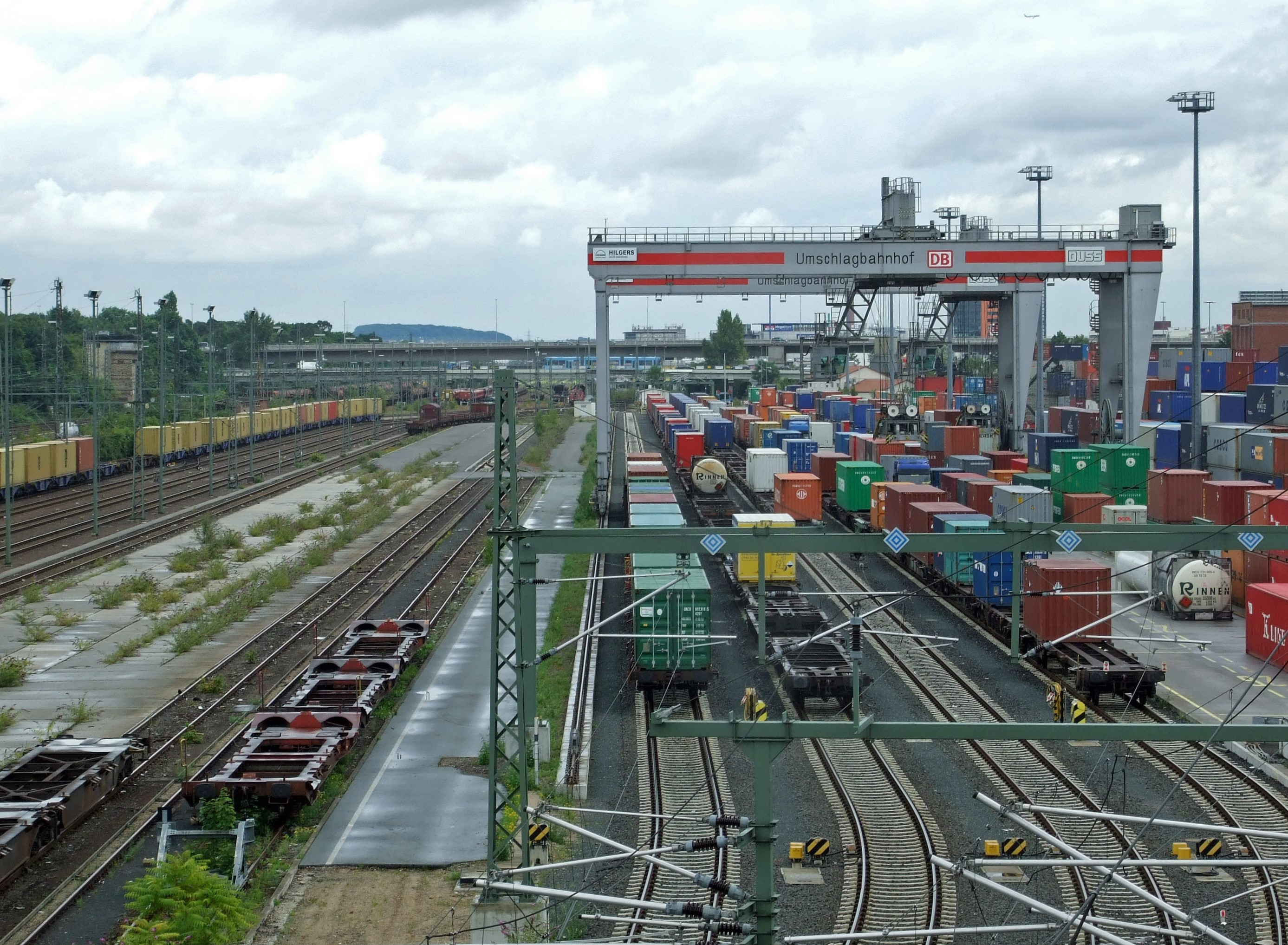
Container terminal

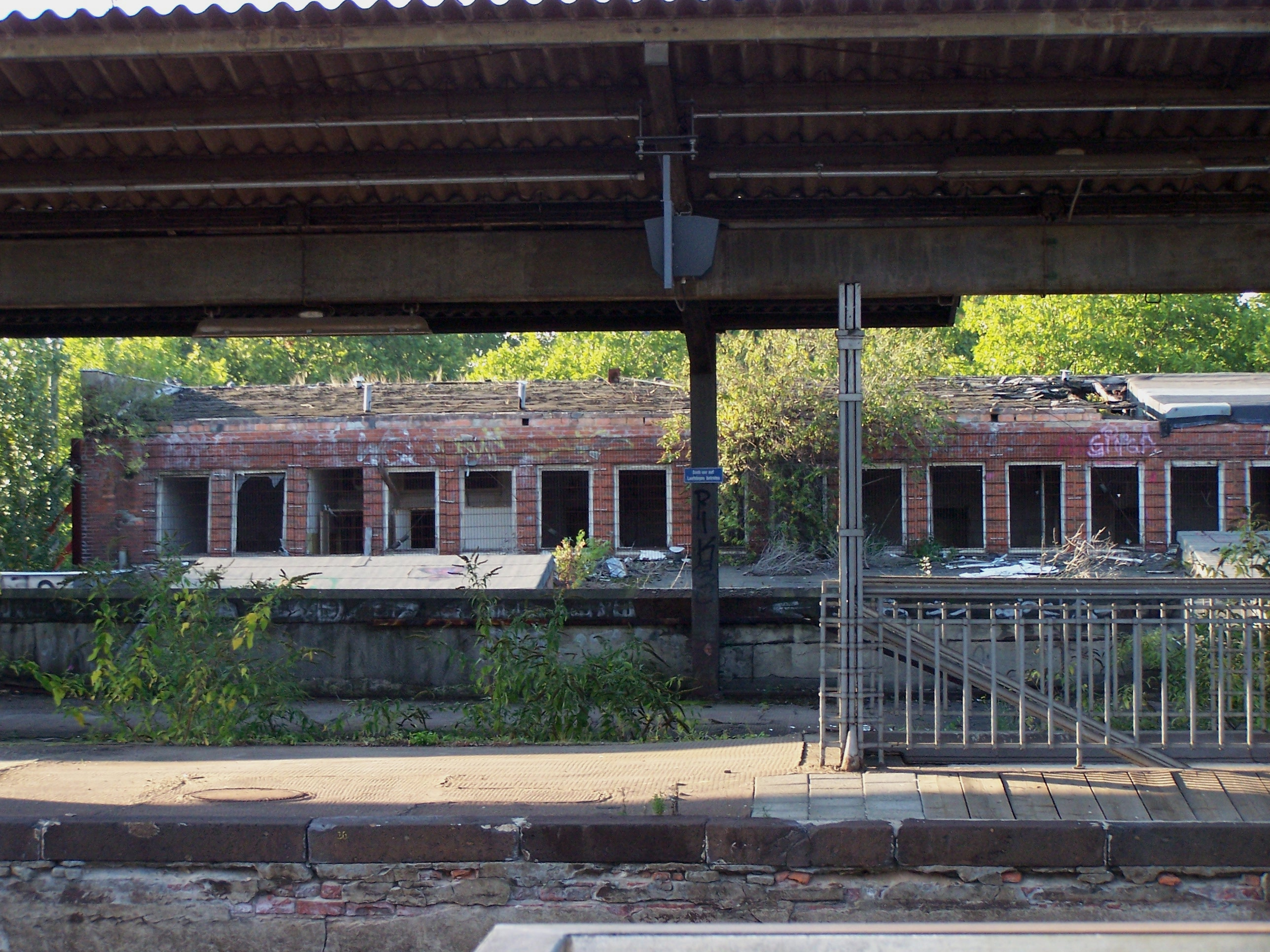
Abandoned platforms

After the closure of the central Frankfurt freight yard, the Frankfurt East station became the centre of freight handling in Frankfurt. The freight yard was expanded from about 2003 to house a container terminal. A large area to the east of the station (which had previously been used for the Frankfurt Main East railway workshop) was redeveloped as a storage space for containers and transport vehicles along with arrival and departure routes to the road network. Complete freight trains are run from the East station yard mainly for the automotive and mining industries.

== Connections ==
Until 1993, Frankfurt East station was served directly by tram line 11. As a result of the rebuilding of Danziger Platz, the tram stop was moved into the adjacent Hanauer Landstraße, originally with the intention of it returning a rebuilt stop at its former location in the station forecourt after the completion of construction works. For cost reasons and because the current stop is closer to the future home of the European Central Bank on the grounds of the former Großmarkthalle, the city council decided in 2002 to leave the tram stop permanently in its current situation. Since 1999, East station has been connected to the U-Bahn network.

== Future ==
In the next few years the North Main S-Bahn is expected to be built from Frankfurt East station to Hanau next to the current Frankfurt–Hanau line. Until a decision is made on the commencement of construction of the S-Bahn line, the current run-down condition of the station is likely to continue.
