= Hösbach station =

Railway station in Bavaria, Germany

Hösbach

General information
- Location: Aschaffenburger Straße 19; 63768 Hösbach; Bavaria; Germany
- Coordinates: 49°59′59″N 9°13′41″E
- Elevation: 158 m (518 ft)
- System: Hp
- Owner: Deutsche Bahn
- Operator: DB Station&Service
- Lines: Main–Spessart railway (KBS 800)
- Platforms: 2 side platforms
- Tracks: 3
- Train operators: DB Regio Bayern; Hessische Landesbahn

Construction
- Parking: yes
- Cycle facilities: no
- Accessible: partly

Other information
- Station code: 2925
- DS100 code: NHOE
- IBNR: 8002918
- Category: 6
- Fare zone: VAB: 9143; : 9140 (VAB transitional tariff)
- Website: www.bahnhof.de

Services
Preceding station	Hessische Landesbahn	Following station
Aschaffenburg Hbf towards Rüsselsheim Opelwerk	RB 58	Laufach Terminus
Preceding station	DB Regio Bayern	Following station
Aschaffenburg Hbf Terminus	RB 79 Limited service	Laufach towards Würzburg Hbf
Location
- Location within Bavaria Location within Germany Location within Europe

Hösbach station is a railway station in the municipality of Hösbach, located in the Aschaffenburg district in Bavaria, Germany.
