= FHD (disambiguation) =

FHD most commonly refers to full high definition, or 1920x1080 resolution.

FHD or variations could also refer to:

- .fhd, file format used by Macromedia FreeHand
- Focal hand dystonia, idiopathic movement disease
- Fachhochschule Dresden, a university in Dresden, Germany
- Maintal Ost station, a railway station in Maintal, Germany
- Color magnitude diagram (German: Farben-Helligkeits-Diagramm), in astrophysics
