= Frankfurt Süd–Aschaffenburg railway =

Railway line in Germany

Frankfurt Süd–Aschaffenburg

Overview
- Status: Operational
- Owner: Deutsche Bahn
- Line number: 3660
- Locale: Hesse, Germany
- Termini: Frankfurt South; Hanau Hbf.

Service
- Type: Heavy rail, Passenger/freight rail Regional rail
- Route number: 640
- Operator(s): DB Netz

History
- Opened: Stages between 1848 - 1854

Technical
- Line length: 43.2 km (26.8 mi)
- Number of tracks: Double track
- Track gauge: 1,435 mm (4 ft 8 1/2 in) standard gauge
- Electrification: 15 kV 16.7 Hz AC Overhead line
- Operating speed: 160 km/h (99 mph)

The Frankfurt Süd–Aschaffenburg railway was opened in 1848 and 1854 and was one of the oldest railways in Germany. It is now a double track electrified main line, beginning in Frankfurt South station (Südbahnhof) and running from Frankfurt's Frankfurt East station (Ostbahnhof) on the right bank of the Main via Hanau Hauptbahnhof to Aschaffenburg Hauptbahnhof.

== History ==
=== Planning ===
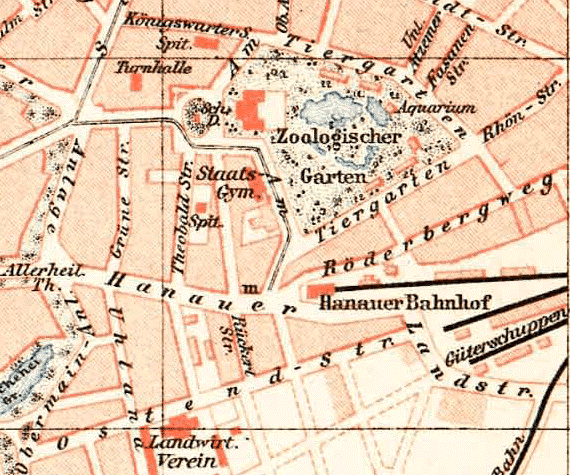
Original Hanau station (Hanauer Bahnhof) in Frankfurt Ostend

The Frankfurt-Hanau Railway Company (German: Frankfurt-Hanauer Eisenbahn Gesellschaft, FHE) was founded at the initiative of the Prussian consul general to the Free City of Frankfurt, Moritz von Bethmann and with the financial support of the Gebrüder Bethmann bank of Frankfurt and the Bernus du Fay bank of Hanau. On 12 April 1843, the company received a preliminary construction permit from the Electorate of Hesse (Kurhessen), which was converted into a concession in 1844. The concession allowed for the compulsory purchase of the land required. Most of the line ran over the territory of the Electorate of Hesse, only the western section and the Frankfurt terminus, called Hanauer Bahnhof (Hanau line station) were located on the territory of the Free City of Frankfurt. Both the Electorate of Hesse and the Free City of Frankfurt were then independent states, separated by a customs boundary.

The line ran from Hanau station in Frankfurt to its station in Hanau, now called Hanau West station. The original 16.4 km long track is located on the right, northern bank of the Main and was designed by the engineer Peter Johann Wilhelm Zobel. The construction of the railway began in October 1845 in the district of Dörnigheim. There were no significant topographic obstacles to the line. It had only two – elongated – curves through Fechenheimer Mainbogen and at the entry to the spa at Wilhelmsbad. A significant bridge was only required over the Kinzig, just outside the original Hanau station. The stations along the route were equipped to allow trains to pass if necessary.

There was opposition to building the line in Dörnigheim, where the village was divided from part of its fields by the railway, but did not receive a station. Initially, only one track was laid, but the line was prepared for two tracks. The line served traffic between the emerging industrial city of Hanau and its important market in Frankfurt. Since the 17th century there had been regular transport by river boat to market along the Main; this was abandoned after the opening of the railway.

=== Establishment and revolution ===
The line was opened for normal services on 10 September 1848 and used on the first day by 15,000 people, which led to chaotic scenes. On the day before the opening a run had been held for invited guests, including members of the Frankfurt Parliament and other celebrities, including the revolutionary, August Schärttner. The Hanau station was decorated with then radical black, red and gold flag. A week after the opening the railway was affected by revolutionary events: a vote of the National Assembly on 16 September 1848 reversed its original rejection of the Armistice of Malmö on Schleswig-Holstein, leading to an attempted revolt of radical forces in Frankfurt. To prevent the arrival of radicals from Hanau by train, Prussian troops dismantled the line at Mainkur.

=== Connection to rail network ===
On 22 July 1854, the line was extended by the FHE for 8.9 km to the Bavarian border. At the same time a continuation of the line was built to Aschaffenburg. This was built as part of the Ludwig Western Railway, but leased by the FHE from the Royal Bavarian State Railways. Before the building of the line there was a government crisis in Hesse in 1852, because Elector Frederick William expected a bribe of 100,000 thalers from the Bernus du Fay bank before he would sign the appropriate license for the extension of the railway towards Aschaffenburg. The Chief Minister, Ludwig Hassenpflug, offered his resignation, but the elector refused to accept it.

On 31 January 1859 the FHE took over operations of Frankfurt City Link Line, which was opened at that time, connecting the Hanauer Bahnhof in Frankfurt, at the eastern rim of the city, with the Frankfurt western stations. The FHE was thus linked for the first time to the other Frankfurt railways.

The Hessian Ludwig Railway (Hessische Ludwigs-Eisenbahn-Gesellschaft, HLB), which was established in the Grand Duchy of Hesse recognized the importance of the HLB for the expansion of railway services in the Rhine-Main region, particularly to the province of Upper Hesse (an exclave of the Grand Duchy), from the Rhine-Main area to Bavaria and via the Kinzig valley to Bebra. Therefore, from 1862, the HLB tried to acquire the FHE. A merger failed due to opposition from the Kurhessen government, which was planning the construction of the Frankfurt–Bebra railway, which initially used the Frankfurt-Hanau Railway's line to reach Frankfurt. The HLB took over the management only of the FHE from 1 January 1863 to 31 December 1872. After the annexation of Kurhessen by Prussia after the Austro-Prussian War of 1866, the FHE was taken over by the HLB in 1872.

The Frankfurt–Bebra railway was completed from Bebra to Hanuau 1868 and in 1873, it was extended on the south bank line to the Bebra station in Frankfurt, now called Frankfurt South station (Südbahnhof). The new line involved crossing the Frankfurt–Hanau railway at a junction about a kilometre east of the edge of Hanau's built-up area at the time. The location of the junction was determined by the location of the bridge over the Main at Steinheim. Hanau East station (now Hanau Hauptbahnhof) was built at the junction.

On 1 February 1897, the line of the former FHE was taken over by the Prussian state railways along with the rest of the HLB. On 1 April 1913, the line was extended by 2.38 km from the new East station via the Deutschherrn bridge over the Main to Frankfurt South. This made the Hanauer Bahnhof, a terminal station, redundant and it closed in 1913. Operationally, it was replaced by Frankfurt (Main) Ost station, which was further to the east, and was a through station.

In 1937, the connecting curve between Steinerts junction and Mainaschaff junction on the Rhine-Main Railway was put into operation.

During the Second World War, the route, as an important traffic route, was the target of Allied air raids. It was hit by a raid on the night of 1–2 April 1942, among others.

== Route ==
The line begins at Frankfurt (Main) Süd station on platforms 7 and 8 as an extension from the original Main Railway. A ramp from Seehofstrasse is followed by a flyover structure over the Main south bank line to Hanau, immediately after which federal highway 43 is crossed. The line continues at a high level to and over the Deutschherrn Bridge.

After crossing Hanauer Landstraße in front of the Frankfurt Ost station, the line and Hanauer Landstraße run parallel. Northeast of Frankfurt-Mainkur station, both run for a good kilometre in a wide arc directly parallel to the Main. The line then runs completely straight east through the town of Maintal, formed in 1974, including Maintal West station and Maintal Ost station to Hanau-Wilhelmsbad, which it reaches after crossing a feeder road to the A66. The entrance building of Hanau-Wilhelmsbad is the only one on the line that has survived from the time when the railway was built. A wide curve follows from the north-west towards central Hanau. The Kinzig and its floodplain are crossed on bridges made of solid steel girders on brick pillars and abutments built in 1926.

The original temporary terminus of the line (now Hanau West station) is on the edge of Hanau's city centre. Immediately after the current station, a single-track line branches off the main line, which initially runs parallel to it. South of the city centre, the line first pass under federal highway 45 and then divides. While the main line passes under the tracks of the Main south bank line from Frankfurt and then runs to the southern part of Hanau Hauptbahnhof, while the branch line runs on a grade-separated route to the northern part of the station with a direct connection to the Kinzig Valley Railway to Fulda. Between this division and the southern side of Hanau station, another track branches off the main line, which, like the first branch line, also runs through an allotment garden to the northern side of the station.

From the south side of Hanau, the line continues south. It runs to the north bank of the Main to Aschaffenburg Hauptbahnhof.

== Current situation ==
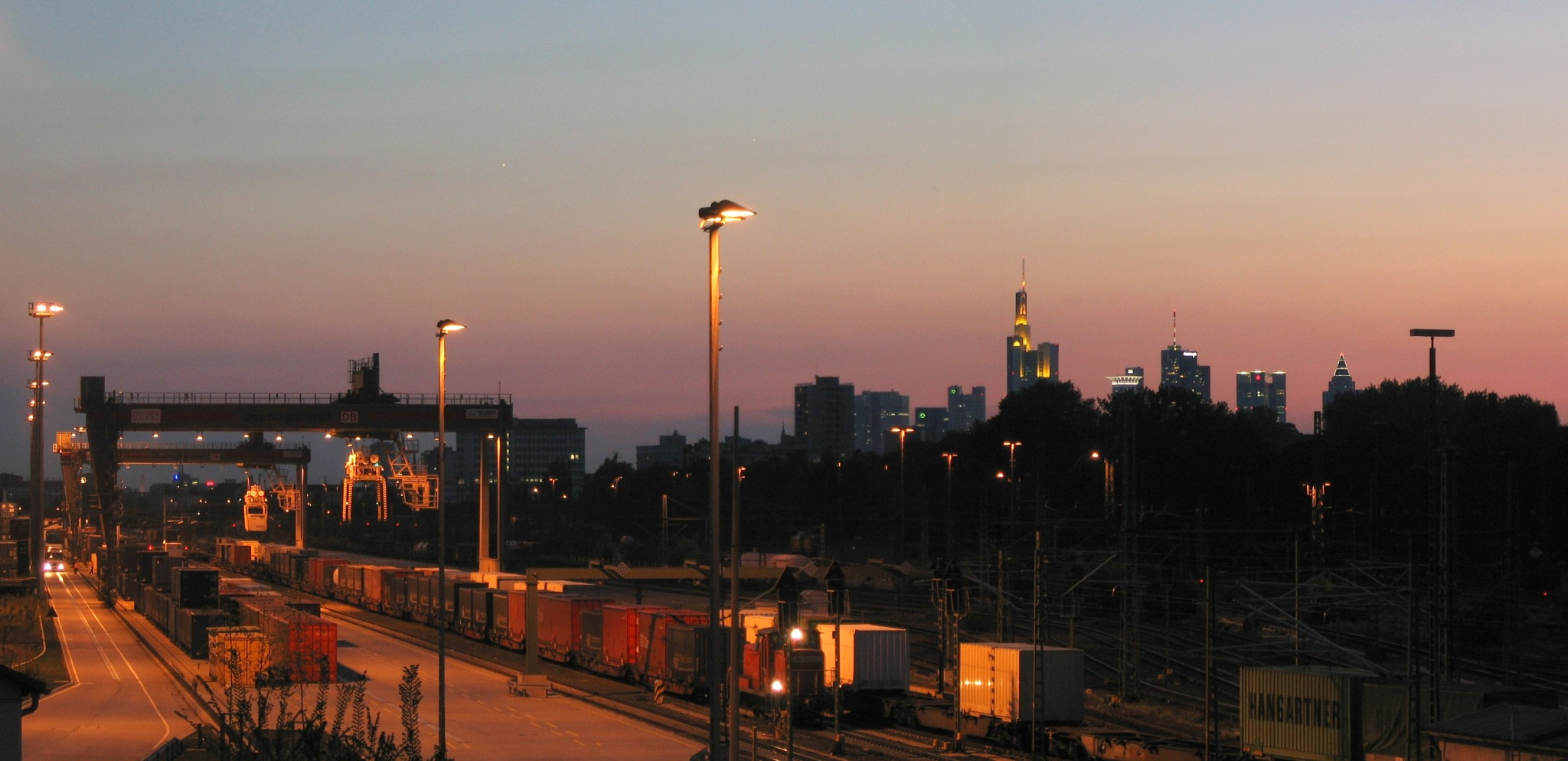
Container depot near Frankfurt East

The track is now double track, electrified and is used by long-distance trains between Frankfurt am Main and Munich. It is also used by freight trains and both mainline and local passenger services. In the area around Frankfurt East station is located – since the demolition of the central Frankfurt freight yard – the largest freight yard in Frankfurt, which includes a container depot.

== Planning ==
The construction of the North Main S-Bahn is planned along the Frankfurt-Hanau line which will add another two tracks south of the existing ones. Some overpasses that have been built in recent years and all the planned works are therefore designed for four tracks.
