= Aschaffenburg Hauptbahnhof =

Railway station in Aschaffenburg, Germany

Aschaffenburg Hbf
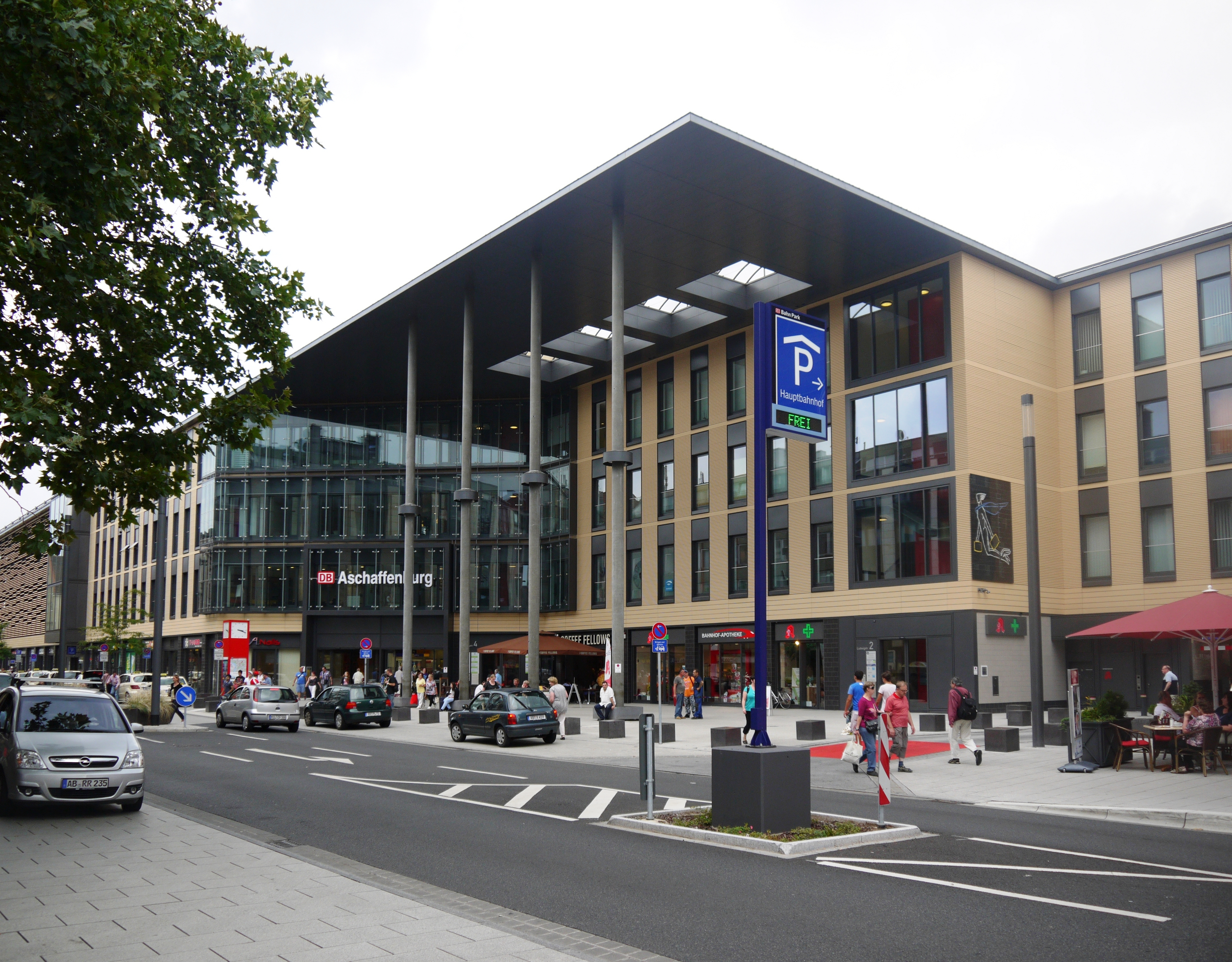

General information
- Location: Aschaffenburg, Bavaria; Germany
- Coordinates: 49°58′49″N 9°08′37″E
- Owner: DB Netz
- Operator: DB Station&Service
- Lines: Aschaffenburg–Würzburg; Aschaffenburg–Frankfurt; Aschaffenburg–Wertheim; Aschaffenburg–Darmstadt
- Platforms: 3 island platforms 1 side platform, 1 bay platform
- Tracks: 8
- Train operators: DB Fernverkehr; DB Regio

Construction
- Accessible: Yes

Other information
- Station code: 187
- DS100 code: NAH
- IBNR: 8000010
- Category: 2
- Fare zone: VAB: 9111; : 9110 (VAB transitional tariff)
- Website: www.bahnhof.de

History
- Opened: 1854; 172 years ago

Services
Preceding station	DB Fernverkehr	Following station
Hanau Hbf towards Hamburg-Altona	ICE 1 Sprinter	Würzburg Hbf towards Passau Hbf
Hanau Hbf towards Dortmund Hbf or Essen Hbf	ICE 41	Würzburg Hbf towards München Hbf
Hanau Hbf towards Dortmund Hbf	ICE 91 selected trains only	Würzburg Hbf towards Wien Hbf
Preceding station	DB Regio Bayern	Following station
Kleinostheim towards Frankfurt (Main) Hbf	RE 54	Heigenbrücken towards Bamberg
Kleinostheim towards Frankfurt (Main) Hbf	RE 55	Heigenbrücken towards Würzburg Hbf
Terminus	RB 79	Hösbach towards Würzburg Hbf
Preceding station		Following station
Terminus	RE 87	Aschaffenburg Süd towards Crailsheim
Terminus	RB 56	Kahl (Main) towards Hanau Hbf
Terminus	RB 88	Aschaffenburg Hochschule towards Miltenberg
Preceding station	Hessische Landesbahn	Following station
Kleinostheim towards Frankfurt Airport regional	RE 59	Terminus
Kleinostheim towards Rüsselsheim Opelwerk	RB 58	Hösbach towards Laufach
Mainaschaff towards Wiesbaden Hbf	RB 75	Terminus
Location

Aschaffenburg Hauptbahnhof is the main station of Aschaffenburg in the German state of Bavaria. It is located on the busy Ruhr– Frankfurt–Nuremberg–Munich/Vienna rail corridor. Deutsche Bahn classifies it as a category 2 station. It forms the boundary between the city centre and the district of Damm.

== History ==
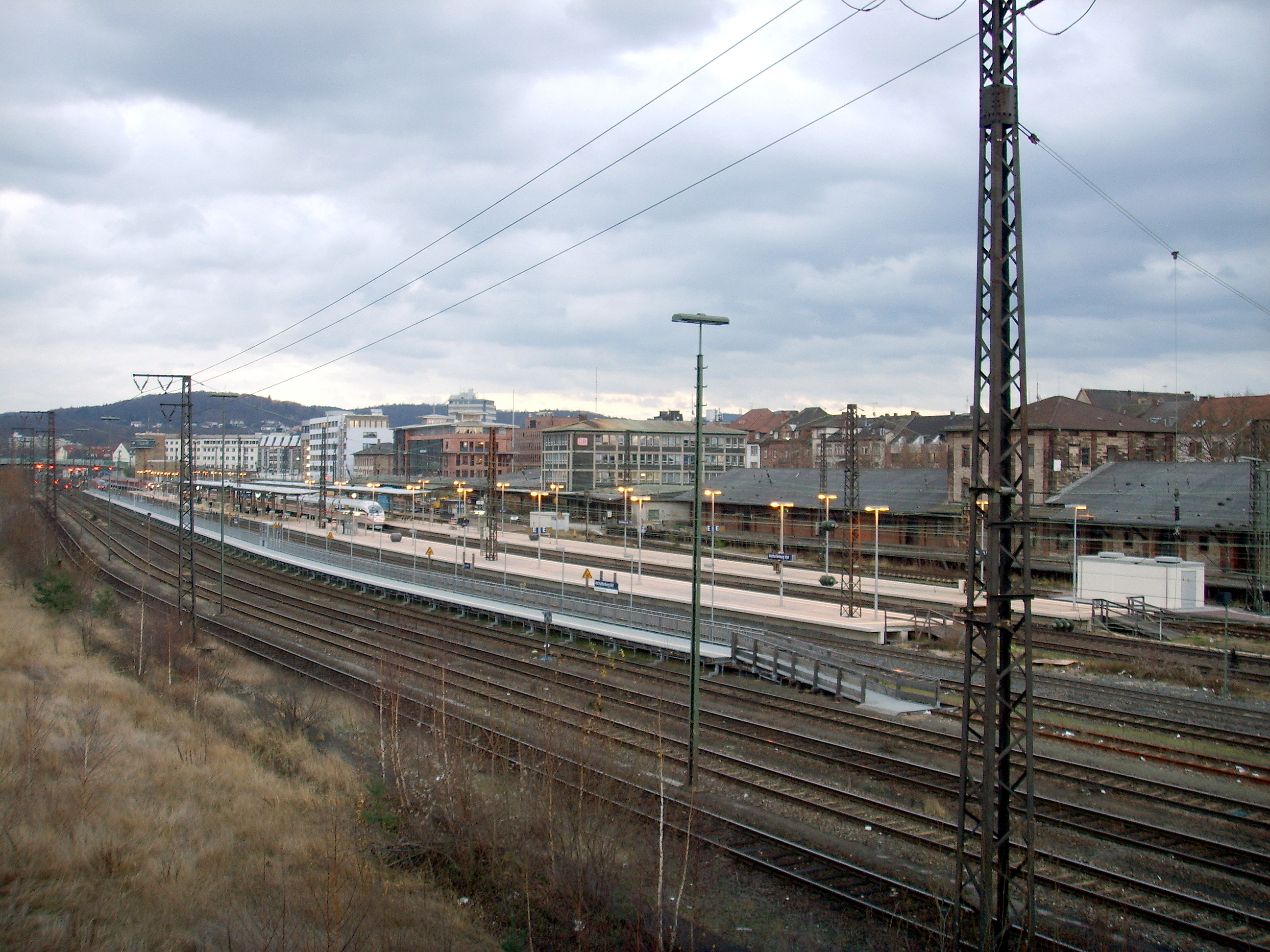
Aschaffenburg Hauptbahnhof during the renovation in 2005.

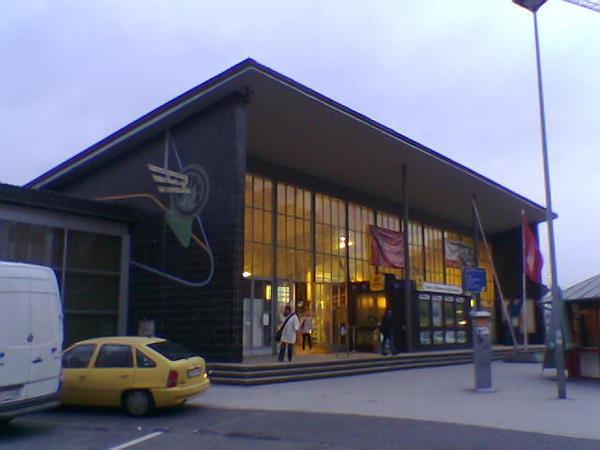
Former entrance building of Hans Kern (demolished in 2009)

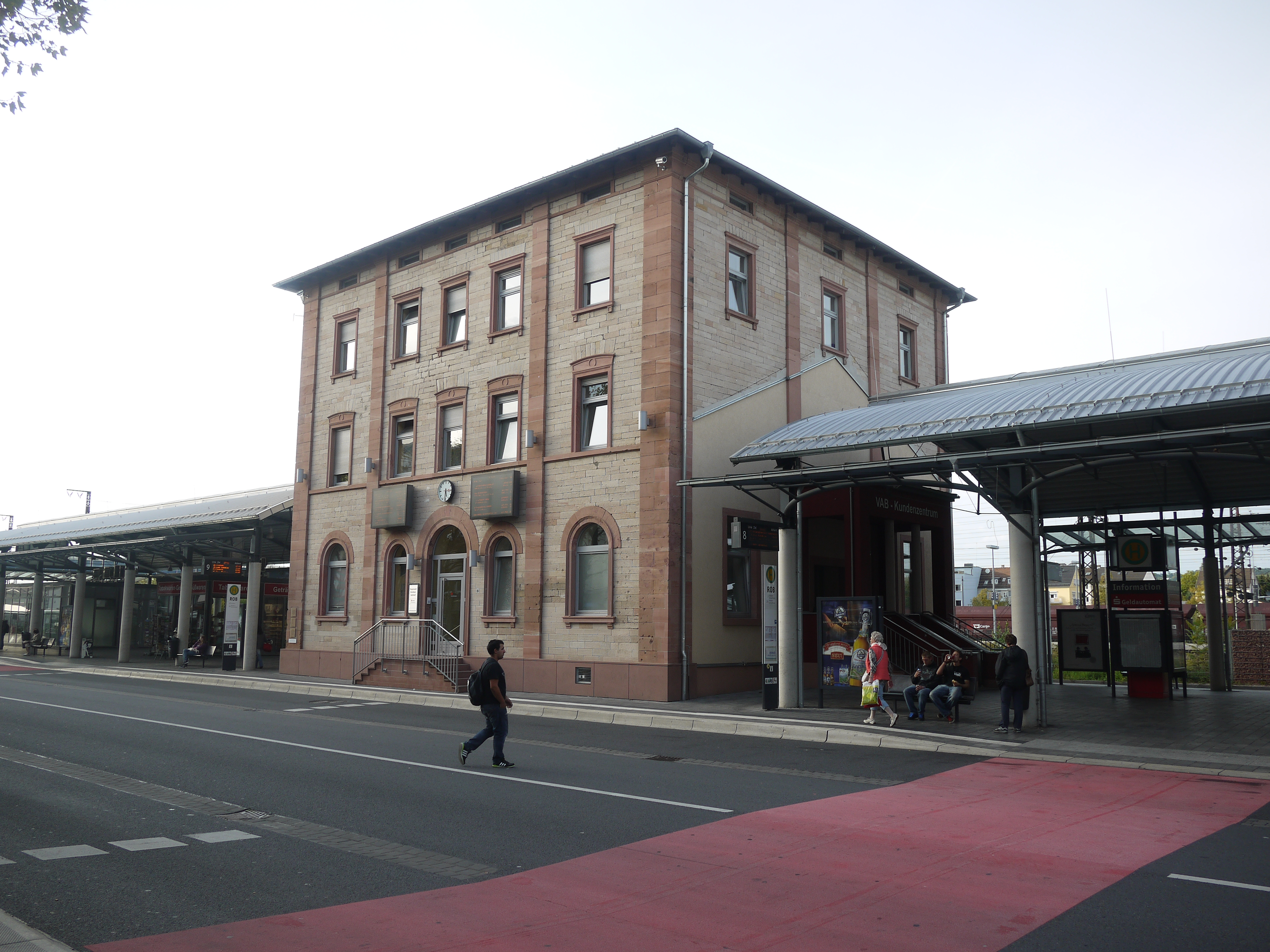
Former freight yard, now bus station

The passenger station was originally located at the modern marshalling yard, which has been mostly dismantled. The station was opened in 1854 with the commissioning of the Bavarian Ludwig Western Railway (Ludwigs-West-Bahn]) on what was then a green field. During the Second World War, the station as a hub represented a target for Allied air raids, including on the night of 1/2 April 1942. The original station building was destroyed in an air raid on the railway facilities on 29 December 1944. In the first half of the 1950s, a new building by Hans Kern was built on the same site in an objective style. The entrance hall had a large glass front, a flat roof and an extension with the station restaurant.

The station was renewed starting in 2004 with the raising of the platforms and the installation of lifts. This involved the demolition of the old station building and the building of a new building with a large commercial space and a parking garage with over 400 parking spaces. The new building was opened on 29 January 2011. An extension of the new platform underpass to the north to the district of Damm was opened at the end of February 2012 to improve access to the station for the residents of that district. Another parking garage was opened in April 2012 with about 200 commuter parking spaces on two of the six parking levels. The traffic flow on the station forecourt on the south side of the station, which is on the north side of central Aschaffenburg, was redesigned.

In October 2010, a miniature copy of the Hermes-Mosaik (Hermes mosaic), which was previously mounted on the outside wall, was attached to the east side of the new entrance building. The old work of art was reproduced as a digital photo print on four aluminum panels. The majority of the original tiles were rescued without permission of the station's owner just before the demolition of the station building and reassembled by the graphic artist.

== Infrastructure ==
The passenger station has seven through platform tracks and a bay platform at the eastern end of the station. The six tracks adjoining to the north (tracks 101 to 106) are primarily used for freight. The tracks of Aschaffenburg Hbf were controlled until 1974 by many decentralised mechanical and electromechanical signal boxes. Since 1974, they have been controlled by a push-button relay interlocking signal box at the eastern end of the station.

== Transport services ==
The station is served from different directions. The ICE line 41 connects the station every hour with Munich and the Ruhr area. During the daytime there are still some IC and ICE connections to Hamburg, Nuremberg and Vienna. There is a RE and a RB service to Frankfurt, together running approximately every half hour. The RB 58 service runs from Frankfurt South via Aschaffenburg to Laufach. An RB service runs to Miltenberg at least every hour, which is complemented by a RE service to Crailsheim every two hours. The RB 75 service (Rhine-Main Railway runs to Wiesbaden hourly; there are additional services in the peak. The RE 54 or 55 runs hourly to Würzburg.

Line	Route	Services	Operator
ICE 1	Hamburg-Altona – Hamburg – Essen – Duisburg – Düsseldorf – Cologne – Bonn – Koblenz – Mainz – Frankfurt Airport – Frankfurt – Aschaffenburg – Würzburg – Nuremberg – Regensburg – Passau	Two train pairs	DB Fernverkehr
ICE 41	(Dortmund –) Essen – Köln Messe/Deutz – Frankfurt (Main) – Aschaffenburg – Würzburg – Nuremberg – Munich	Every 60 minutes	DB Fernverkehr
ICE 91	Frankfurt – Hanau – Aschaffenburg – Würzburg – Nuremberg – Regensburg – Plattling – Passau – Wels – Linz – St. Pölten – Vienna	individual services	DB Fernverkehr
RE 54RE 55	Frankfurt (Main) – Hanau – Kahl – Aschaffenburg – Lohr – Gemünden – Würzburg (– Bamberg)	120 min	DB Regio Bayern
RE 59	Aschaffenburg – Hanau – Frankfurt Süd – Frankfurt Stadion – Frankfurt Airport Regional	Two train pairs Mo-Fr	Hessische Landesbahn
RE 84	Aschaffenburg – Miltenberg – Walldürn	One train pair	Westfrankenbahn
RE 87	Aschaffenburg – Miltenberg – Wertheim – Bad Mergentheim – Crailsheim	60 min	Westfrankenbahn
RB 56	Aschaffenburg – Hanau	One train pair	Westfrankenbahn
RB 58	Laufach – Aschaffenburg – Kahl (Main) – Hanau – Maintal – Frankfurt Süd – Frankfurt Airport – Rüsselsheim Opelwerk	60 min	Hessische Landesbahn
RB 75	Aschaffenburg – Babenhausen (Hess) – Dieburg – Darmstadt – Groß-Gerau – Mainz – Wiesbaden	Every 30 minutes to Darmstadt, continuing every 60 minutes to Wiesbaden.	Hessische Landesbahn
RB 79	Aschaffenburg – Laufach – Heigenbrücken – Lohr – Gemünden (Main)	Every 60 minutes in the peak	DB Regio Bayern
RB 88	Aschaffenburg – Miltenberg	Every 60 minutes (every 30 min in the peak)	Westfrankenbahn

From 1891 until the end of the 1950s, the so-called Mainländebahn (Main lands railway) branched off below the Bischberg (hill) to the former rafting and trading port. Between 1911 and 1974 there was also a passenger train connection via the Aschaffenburg−Höchst (Odenwald) railway) to Höchst im Odenwald. Since the road link in the Bachgau is congested, especially in the peak hour, a reactivation of this connection, at least to Großostheim, is regularly discussed.

The regional bus station is in front of the station. This provides links in all directions, including to Alzenau, Schöllkrippen, Mainaschaff, Kahl and Obernburg. Many of these buses run every hour or every half hour. Within the city many of these bus services follow the same route so that on some routes buses run about every 2 minutes.

== See also ==
- Rail transport in Germany
- Railway stations in Germany
