= Laufach station =

Railway station in Laufach, Germany

Laufach

General information
- Location: Bahnhofstraße; 63846 Laufach; Bavaria; Germany
- Coordinates: 50°00′38″N 9°16′40″E
- Elevation: 175 m (574 ft)
- System: Bf
- Owner: Deutsche Bahn
- Operator: DB Station&Service
- Lines: Main–Spessart railway (KBS 800)
- Platforms: 1 island platform 1 side platform
- Tracks: 5
- Train operators: DB Regio Bayern; Hessische Landesbahn

Construction
- Parking: yes
- Cycle facilities: yes
- Accessible: partly

Other information
- Station code: 3587
- DS100 code: NLA
- IBNR: 8003582
- Category: 6
- Fare zone: VAB: 9341; : 9340 (VAB transitional tariff)
- Website: www.bahnhof.de

Services
Preceding station	Hessische Landesbahn	Following station
Hösbach towards Rüsselsheim Opelwerk	RB 58	Terminus
Preceding station	DB Regio Bayern	Following station
Hösbach towards Aschaffenburg Hbf	RB 79 Limited service	Heigenbrücken towards Würzburg Hbf
Location
- Location within Bavaria Location within Germany Location within Europe

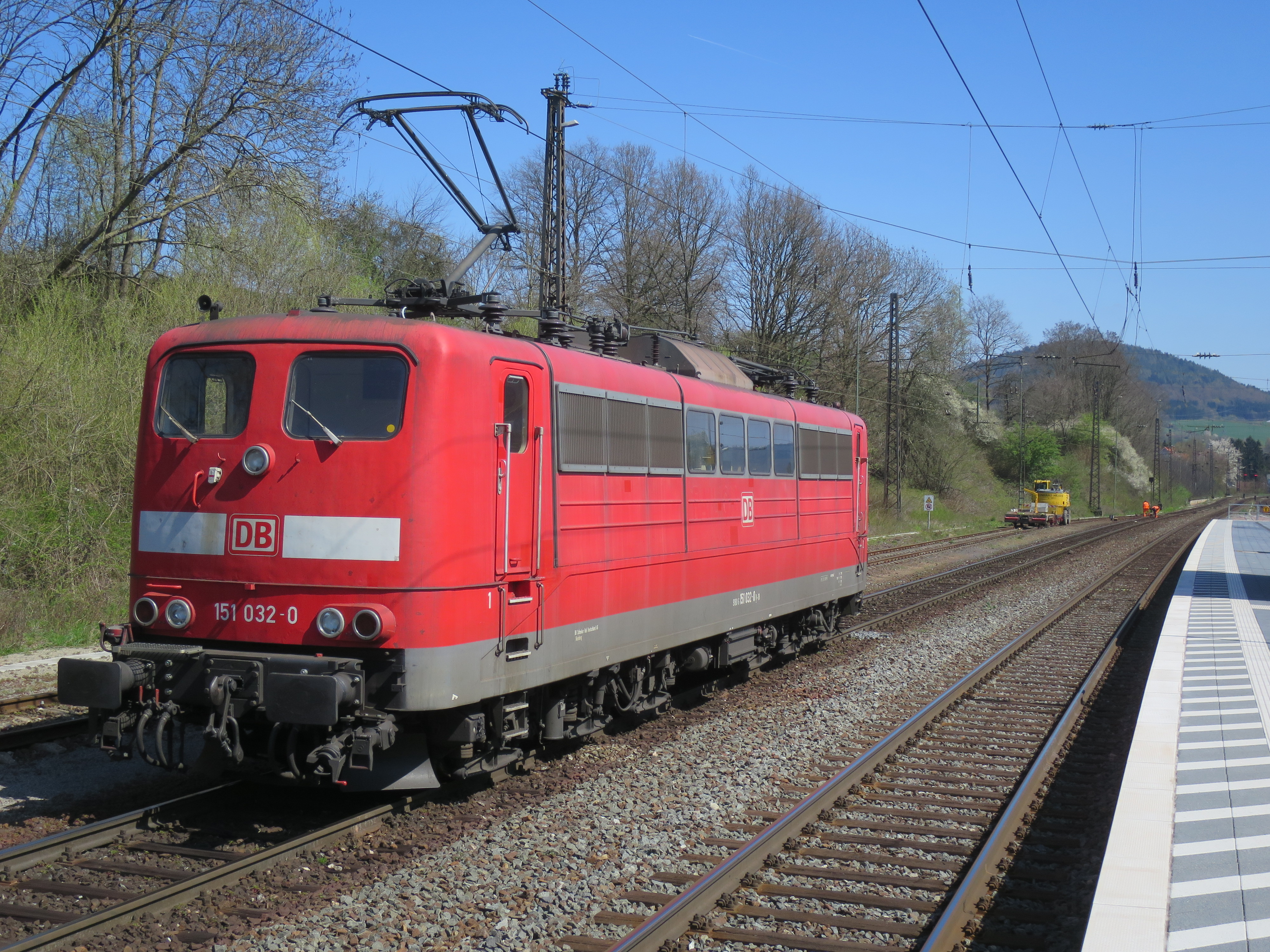
Pusher engine 151 032-0 at Laufach Rly station

Laufach station is a railway station in the municipality of Laufach, located in the Aschaffenburg district in Bavaria, Germany.
