= Rüsselsheim Opelwerk station =

Railway station in Rüsselsheim am Main, Germany

Rüsselsheim Opelwerk
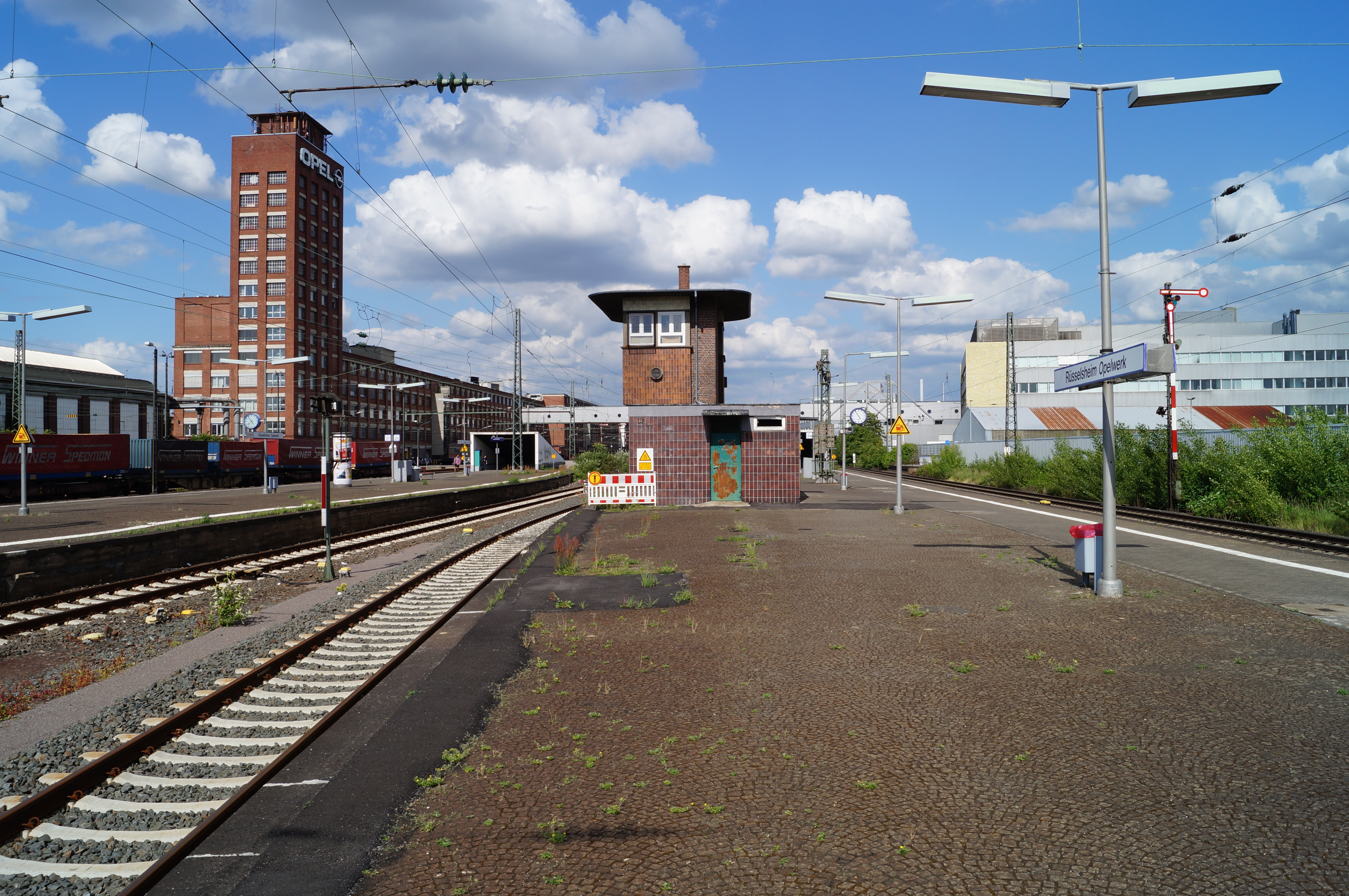
- 2012

General information
- Location: P14; 65428 Rüsselsheim am Main; Hesse; Germany
- Coordinates: 49.9878°N 8.3996°E
- System: Bft
- Owner: Deutsche Bahn
- Operator: DB Netz; DB Station&Service
- Lines: Main Railway (KBS 471)
- Platforms: 2 island platforms
- Tracks: 4
- Train operators: S-Bahn Rhein-Main
- Connections: RB 58

Other information
- Station code: 5441
- DS100 code: FRUO
- IBNR: 8005221
- Category: 4
- Fare zone: : 3730
- Website: www.bahnhof.de

History
- Opened: 1978; 48 years ago

Services
Preceding station	Hessische Landesbahn	Following station
Terminus	RB 58	Rüsselsheim towards Laufach
Preceding station	Rhine-Main S-Bahn	Following station
Mainz-Bischofsheim towards Wiesbaden Hbf	S8 (Rhine-Main S-Bahn)	Rüsselsheim towards Hanau Hbf
Mainz-Bischofsheim towards Wiesbaden Hbf	S9 (Rhine-Main S-Bahn)	Rüsselsheim towards Hanau Hbf
Location
- Location within Hesse Location within Germany Location within Europe

Rüsselsheim Opelwerk station is a railway station in the Opelwerk ("Opel factory") district in the municipality of Rüsselsheim am Main, located in the Groß-Gerau district in Hesse, Germany.
