= Frankfurt Airport station =

Frankfurt Airport station may refer to:

- Frankfurt Airport regional station, a train station at Frankfurt Airport for regional trains
- Frankfurt Airport long-distance station, a train station at Frankfurt Airport for long-distance trains
