= Rüsselsheim train disaster =

Train wreck

Coordinates: 49.993588°N 8.421224°E

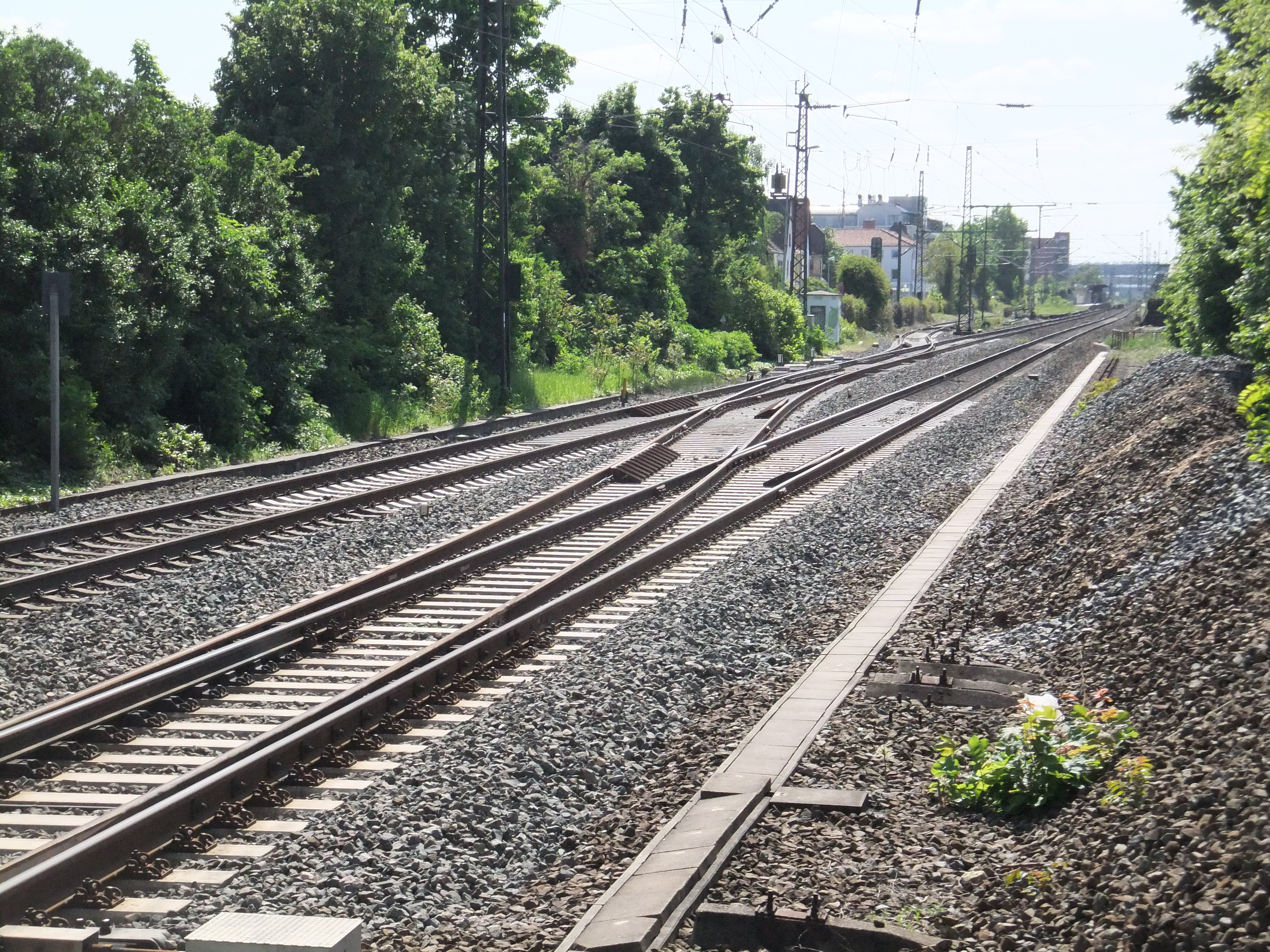
- The place where the accident occurred

Details
- Date: February 2, 1990; 16:45
- Location: Rüsselsheim, Hessen
- Country: West Germany
- Line: Main Railway
- Incident type: Collision

Statistics
- Trains: 2
- Deaths: 17
- Injured: 145
- Damage: 6 mio DM

The Rüsselsheim train disaster occurred on February 2, 1990, on the Main Railway near the Rüsselsheim station in West Germany. With 17 persons killed and 145 injured the train collision is amongst the most serious in rapid transit.

== Account of the accident ==
On February 2, 1990, at 16:42 a Rhine-Main S-Bahn train arrived at Rüsselsheim station. The mass rapid transit DB Class 420 train was on its way from Mainz to Frankfurt on the S14 route. The station is equipped with distant signals before the station platforms and stop signals after them. The Indusi inductor system provides a level of Train protection. As he approached the station, the train driver acknowledged the warning of the distant signal (1000 Hz Indusi), but subsequently forgot about it after carrying out platform duties.

A second DB Class 420 train was approaching from Frankfurt. However, its usual platform was already occupied on this occasion and so it had to be routed to another platform on the other side of the station. This required the train to cross the path of the first train some way before the platforms. Both trains were fully packed during rush hour with an estimate of 500 passengers per train.

Although the next signal was at danger a few hundred meters beyond the station, the driver accelerated quickly as he departed from the platform, and the powerful train easily supported that acceleration. Although both trains had activated the emergency brake—also enforced by an automated train stop (2000 Hz Indusi) on the main signal—the collision occurred at a speed estimated to be about 40 to 70 km/h. The impact was so intense that one of the control cars was lifted upright into the air then fell sideways into a nearby car park.

== Aftermath ==
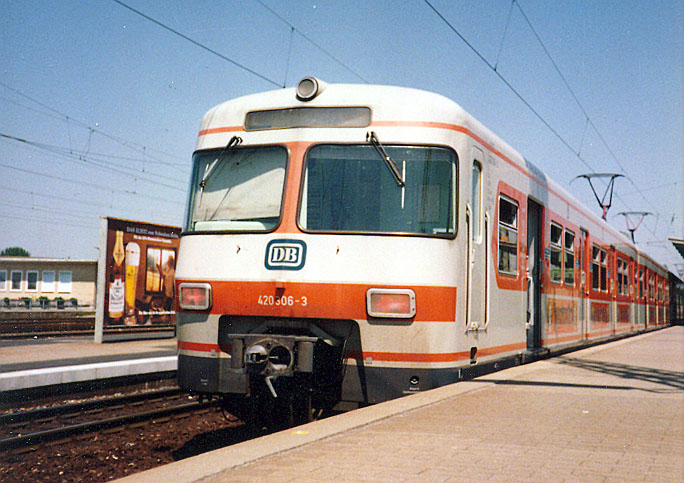
A Class 420 EMU at Bietigheim-Bissingen

The train driver was sentenced to ten months probation and a penalty of 2500 Deutschmark; he never drove trains again. The train porter dispatching the train was acquitted as his duty was to ensure that all the doors were closed; he was not required to remind the driver that the next signal was at danger.

The traditional Indusi train protection system does not enforce any speed restrictions. With the stop signal put at a braking distance the safety overlap depends on an assumed maximum speed and weight of the train. Although operation regulations imposed a maximum speed after a distant signal warning it was not enforced. This disaster led to the extension and rollout of PZB90 – in the final modernisation program of 1995 the Deutsche Bahn equipped 10,000 trains with it (1000 Hz Indusi enforcing a maximum of 45 km/h) and more than 10,000 additional speed restrictions were installed (500 Hz Indusi enforcing a maximum of 25 km/h). All trains in Germany were required to be equipped with PZB90 by 1998.
