= Gateway Gardens station =

Railway station in Frankfurt, Germany

Coordinates: 50.0567°N 8.595°E

Frankfurt Gateway Gardens
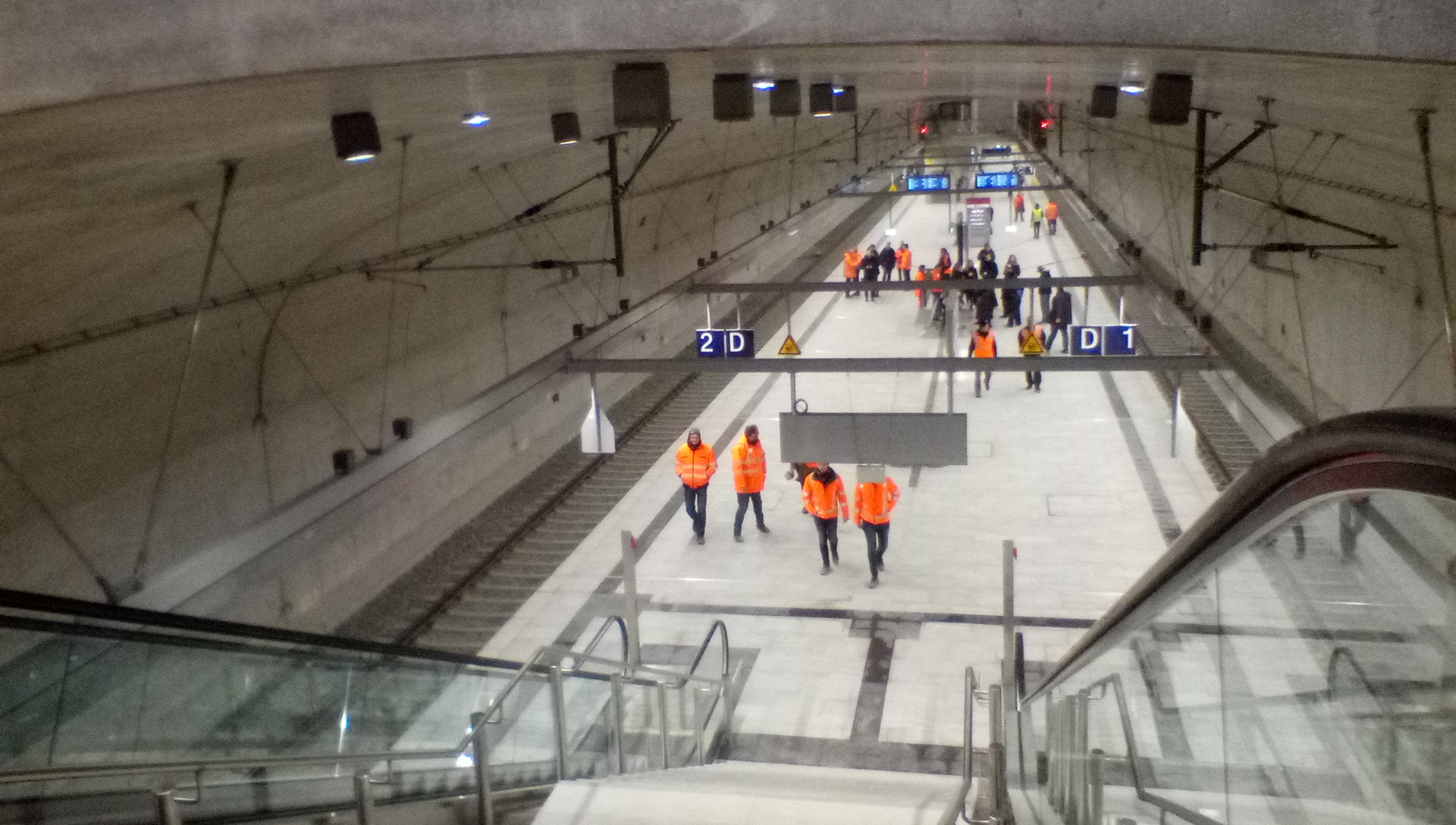
- Station on opening night, in 2019

General information
- Location: Bessie-Coleman-Straße; 60549 Frankfurt; Hesse; Germany
- System: Haltepunkt
- Owner: Deutsche Bahn
- Operator: DB Netz; DB Station&Service
- Lines: Frankfurt Airport loop (KBS 645)
- Platforms: 1 island platform
- Tracks: 2
- Train operators: S-Bahn Rhein-Main
- Connections: X17 77

Construction
- Parking: yes
- Cycle facilities: yes
- Accessible: yes

Other information
- Station code: 8268
- DS100 code: FFGG
- IBNR: 8002060
- Category: 4
- Fare zone: : 5090
- Website: www.bahnhof.de

History
- Opened: 15 December 2019; 6 years ago

Services
Preceding station	Rhine-Main S-Bahn	Following station
Frankfurt Airport Regional towards Wiesbaden Hbf	S8 (Rhine-Main S-Bahn)	Frankfurt Stadion towards Hanau Hbf
Frankfurt Airport Regional towards Wiesbaden Hbf	S9 (Rhine-Main S-Bahn)	Frankfurt Stadion towards Hanau Hbf
Location
- Location within Hesse Location within Germany Location within Europe

Gateway Gardens is an underground railway station 1 kilometre (1 mi) east of Frankfurt Airport in Germany. It is between Frankfurt Stadion station and Frankfurt Airport regional station on lines S8 and S9 of the Rhine-Main S-Bahn commuter network.

== Construction ==
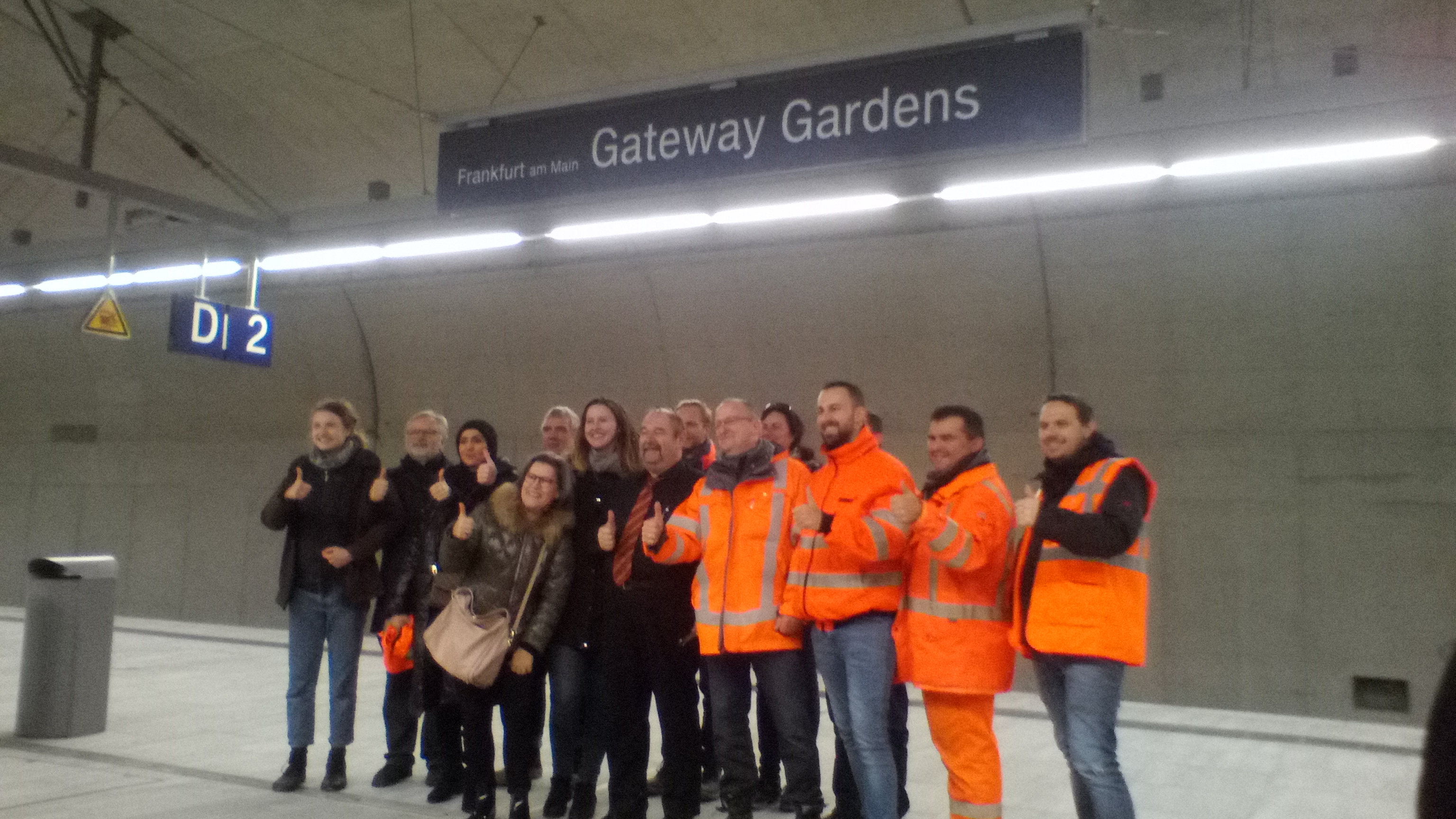
Construction workers under station sign

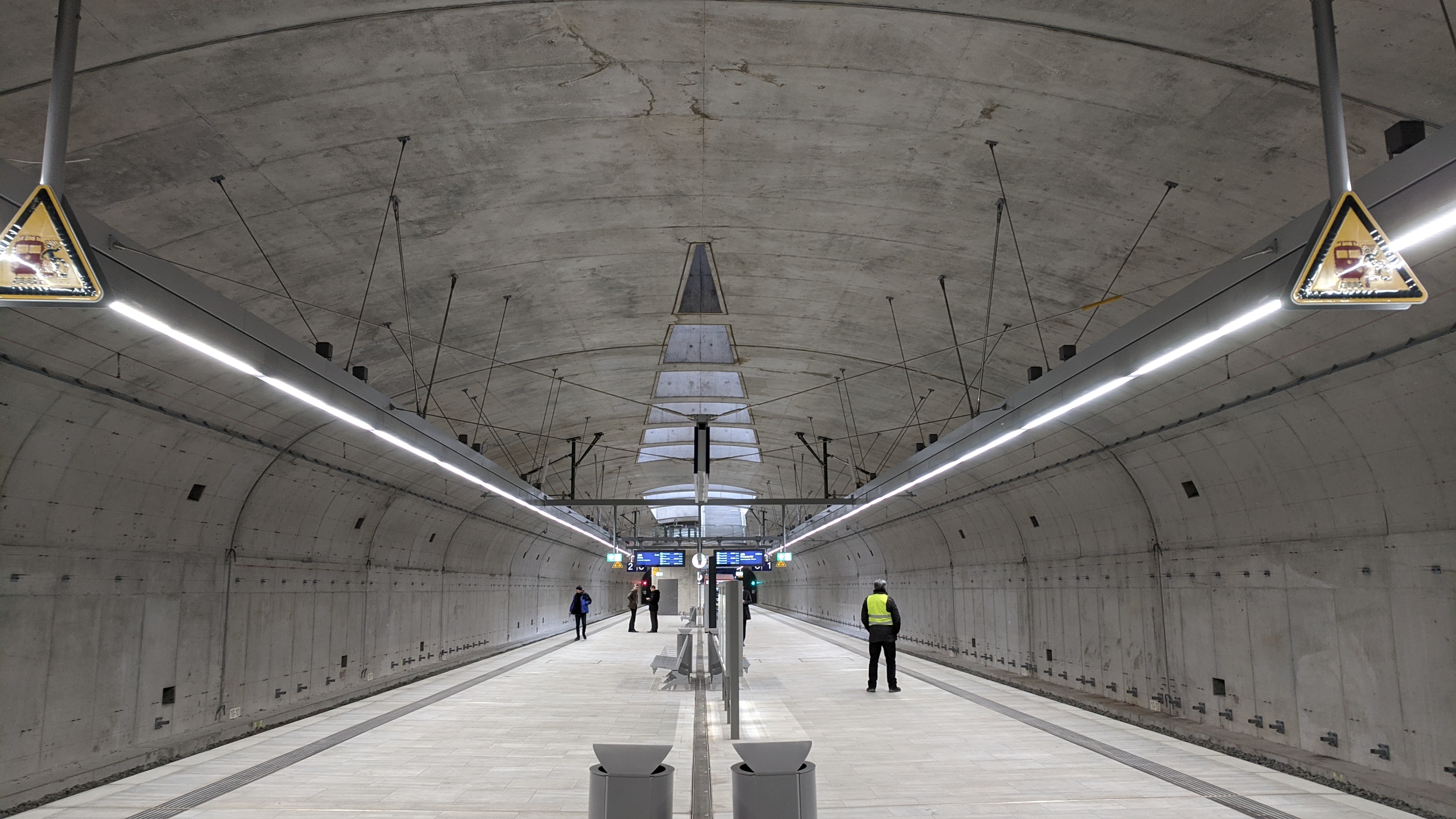
Underground station box with island platform

A new tunnel was constructed under A5 motorway and Bundesstraße 43, with a new bridge over the Main Railway so that the existing Frankfurt Airport loop services could be diverted via the new station. The station has two tracks with an island platform inside a station box constructed using cut and cover.

== Opening ==
An opening ceremony was held on 9 December 2019, with public services beginning in the early hours of 15 December 2019—originally planned for 00:17, but delayed until shortly after 01:30.
