= Raunheim station =

Railway station in Raunheim, Germany

Raunheim
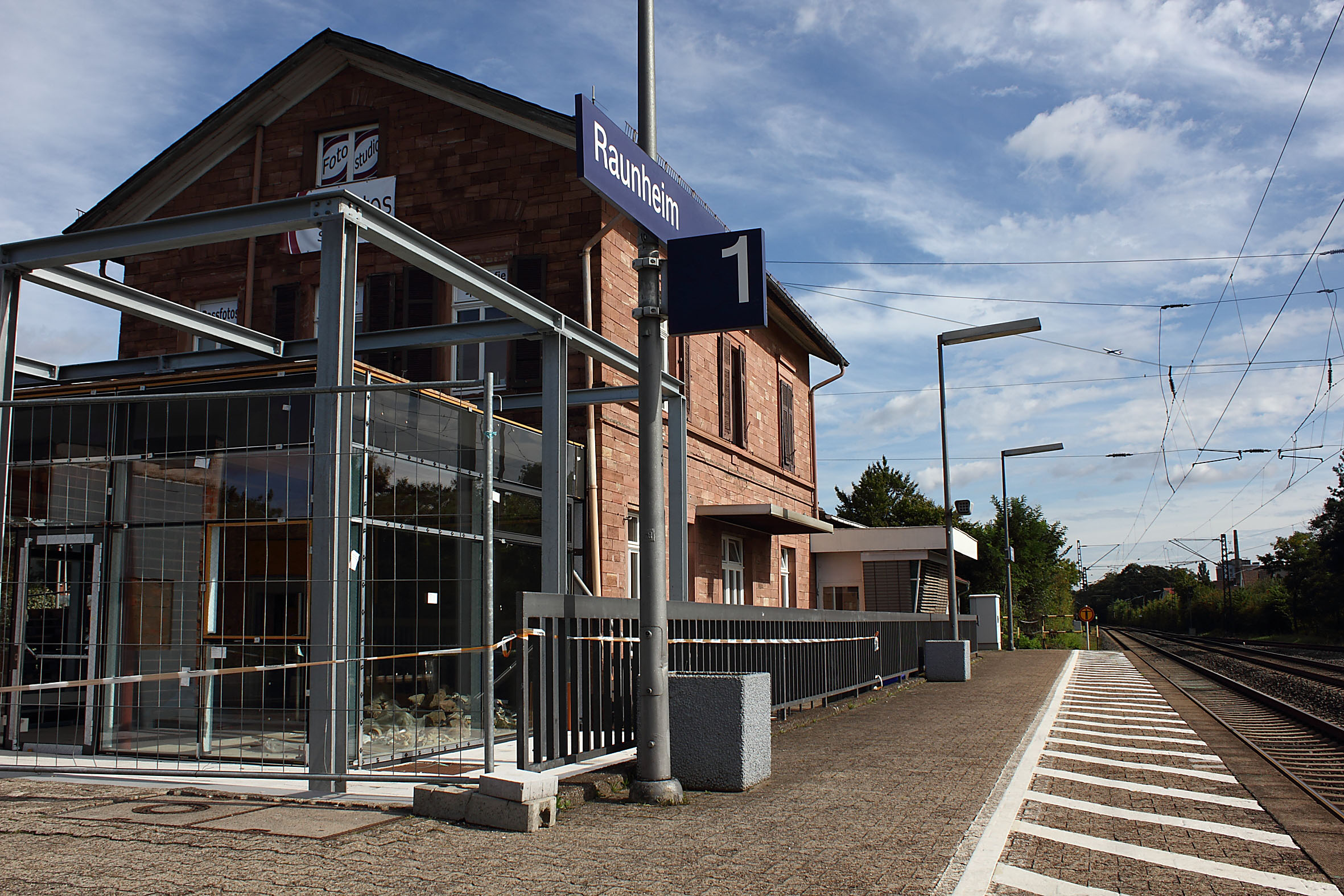

General information
- Location: Raunheim, Hesse; Germany
- Coordinates: 50°00′36″N 8°27′18″E
- Owner: Deutsche Bahn
- Operator: DB Netz; DB Station&Service
- Lines: Main Railway (15.9 km) (KBS 645.8/645.9/655)
- Platforms: 2

Other information
- Station code: n/a
- DS100 code: FRA
- Category: 5
- Fare zone: : 3750
- Website: www.bahnhof.de

History
- Opened: 1863

Services
Preceding station	Rhine-Main S-Bahn	Following station
Rüsselsheim towards Wiesbaden Hbf	S8 (Rhine-Main S-Bahn)	Kelsterbach towards Hanau Hbf
Rüsselsheim towards Wiesbaden Hbf	S9 (Rhine-Main S-Bahn)	Kelsterbach towards Hanau Hbf
Location

Raunheim station is a railway station in the town of Raunheim in the German state of Hesse on the Main Railway from Mainz to Frankfurt am Main. It is classified by Deutsche Bahn as a category 5 station. The station is served by the S-Bahn. The station was opened in 1863.

== Services ==
Raunheim lies in the area served by the Rhein-Main-Verkehrsverbund (Rhine-Main Transport Association, RMV). It is used by Rhine-Main S-Bahn trains operated by DB Regio, and buses.

=== Trains ===
Services on lines S8 and S9 each operate at 30-minute intervals on the Wiesbaden Hauptbahnhof–Hanau Hauptbahnhof route. Together the two lines operate at 15-minute intervals through Raunheim. Line S8 runs through Mainz Hauptbahnhof to Wiesbaden Hauptbahnhof, while line S9 runs via Kostheim Bridge to Mainz-Kastel and Wiesbaden Hauptbahnhof.

=== Buses ===
The station is also served by bus lines 78 and 79.
