= Kelsterbach =

- Town
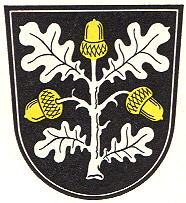
- Coat of arms

- Location of Kelsterbach within Groß-Gerau district
- Interactive map of Kelsterbach
- Location within Germany Location within Hesse
- Coordinates: 50°03′42″N 08°31′52″E
- Country: Germany
- State: Hesse
- Admin. region: Darmstadt
- District: Groß-Gerau

Government
  - Mayor (2021–27): Manfred Ockel (SPD)

Area
  - Total: 15.41 km^{2} (5.95 sq mi)
- Elevation: 107 m (351 ft)

Population (2025-12-31)
  - Total: 16,762
  - Density: 1,088/km^{2} (2,817/sq mi)
- Time zone: UTC+01:00 (CET)
  - Summer (DST): UTC+02:00 (CEST)
- Postal codes: 65451
- Dialling codes: 06107
- Vehicle registration: GG
- Website: www.kelsterbach.de

Kelsterbach (German pronunciation: [ˈkɛlstɐˌbax]) is a town in Groß-Gerau district in Hessen, Germany, part of the Frankfurt Rhein-Main urban area. It is located on Frankfurt's southwestern outskirts at a bend on the left bank of the river Main, right where a small brook, called the Kelster (Bach means "brook" in German) joins the river.

After the Frankfurt–Mainz railway line was built, this formerly mostly agricultural village was transformed by the great number of large factories that located here, bringing along with them a great upswing in the town's population. In the decades following the Second World War, many businesses that were related to Frankfurt International Airport moved to the town. Kelsterbach is home to 16,565 people (As of 2017). The town is an important centre for logistical service providers and chemical production. In 1952, it acquired the status of "town."

== Geography ==
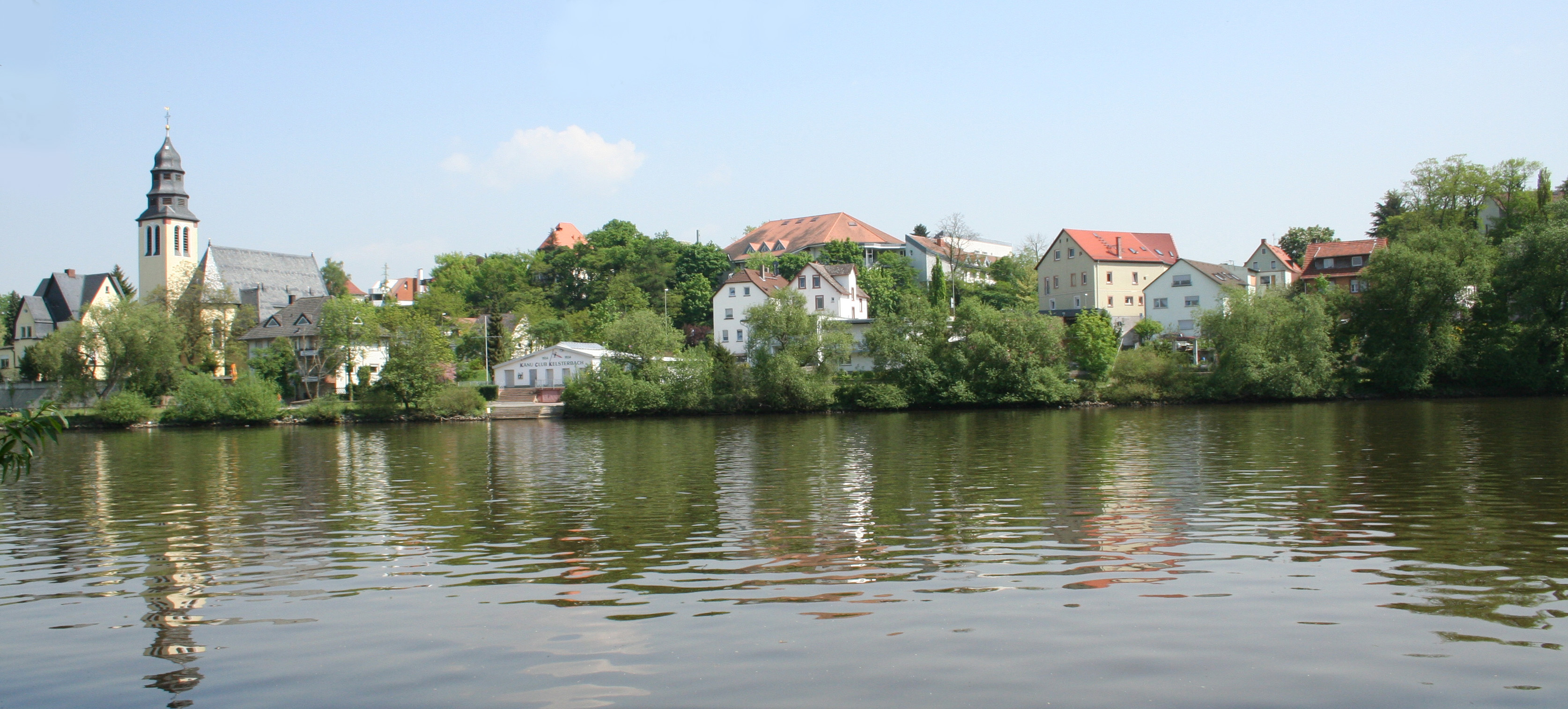
Kelsterbach from the Main riverside at Sindlingen.

=== Location ===
The town lies on the south side of the Main and west of the Frankfurt City Forest. The original village centre, commonly known as the Lower Village (Unterdorf) borders sharply on the considerably bigger housing developments commonly known as the Upper Village (Oberdorf), which arose only after the railway and industrialization came early in the 20th century over the 17 m-high Kelsterbach Terrace, which stretches 8 km west from the Frankfurt City Forest. The town is part of the Greater Frankfurt Region (Stadtregion Frankfurt) as well as the Frankfurt Rhein-Main Region.

=== Neighboring communities ===
Kelsterbach borders in the west on the Hattersheim am Main constituent community of Okriftel (Main-Taunus-Kreis), in the north on the Frankfurt am Main (district-free city) constituent communities of Sindlingen, Höchst and Schwanheim, in the east and south on the airport lands, and in the southwest on the town of Raunheim.

=== Constituent communities ===
Kelsterbach consists of only one constituent community.

== History ==
=== Stone Age ===
Until a short time ago, Kelsterbach was deemed to be the place where Europe's earliest anatomically modern humans had been found. A Cro-Magnon skull that became known as the "Lady from Kelsterbach", reputedly dated to 32,000 years ago, vanished without a trace amid the scandal over the anthropologist Reiner Protsch, and was likely a fake. From the Middle Stone Age, in the area of the Kelsterbach Terrace, microliths have been found. Whether this shows that there were people living there is unknown.

Even ceramic finds dated to all epochs of the New Stone Age do not conclusively indicate settlement in the area.

=== Bronze and Iron Ages ===
On the other hand, it seems likely that there were people living in what is now Kelsterbach in the Bronze Age. The first finds of value from this time were made as early as 1937. Then, in 1972, as work was under way to build the Kelsterbacher Spange – a railway connection – at the edge of the Kelsterbach Terrace between Römerschneise and Schwedenschanze, several sets of Bronze Age finds were brought up. All the archaeological analysis considered as a whole has yielded the assumption that there was a Middle to Late Bronze Age settlement some 10 to 15 m above the Main.

From the early Iron Age (700–450 BC), there are likely various traces of settlement to be found.

=== Roman era ===
Earlier finds gave cause to suppose that there had been a Roman settlement in the 3rd century AD in the Kelsterbach Lowland. In 1970, bits of tile and coins found in the northeast part of the municipal area were enough to prompt extensive digs in 2004 and 2005 by the Goethe University's Institute for Archaeological Sciences. Brought to light in these digs was a building with a fountain, along with many incidental finds. It has been called Kleinvilla ("Small Villa"), and it is believed to date from 200 to 220 AD.

=== Middle Ages ===
Owing to the town's name, it is believed to have been founded by the Franks as Gelsterbach (gelster = loudly rushing). It hardly seems likely that the scanty trickle of a rill that rises in the Frankfurt City Forest and flows through the town now could be Kelsterbach's namesake, even if in ages gone by its flow was considerably greater.

Kelsterbach's first documentary mention, as Gelsterbach, came, as it did for countless other places in Germany, in the Lorsch codex (about 850). For many centuries, Kelsterbach belonged to the Dreieich royal hunting woods, whose central authority lay at Hayn Castle (now a ruin at Dreieichenhayn, a constituent community of Dreieich). The kingly hunting rights were upheld even through the transfer of power to the County of Katzenelnbogen. In 1479, Kelsterbach along with the whole County of Katzenelnbogen passed to the Landgraviate of Hesse, and through division of inheritance in 1567, to Hesse-Darmstadt, whose history was shared thereafter by this rather insignificant farming village.

=== Contemporary art era ===
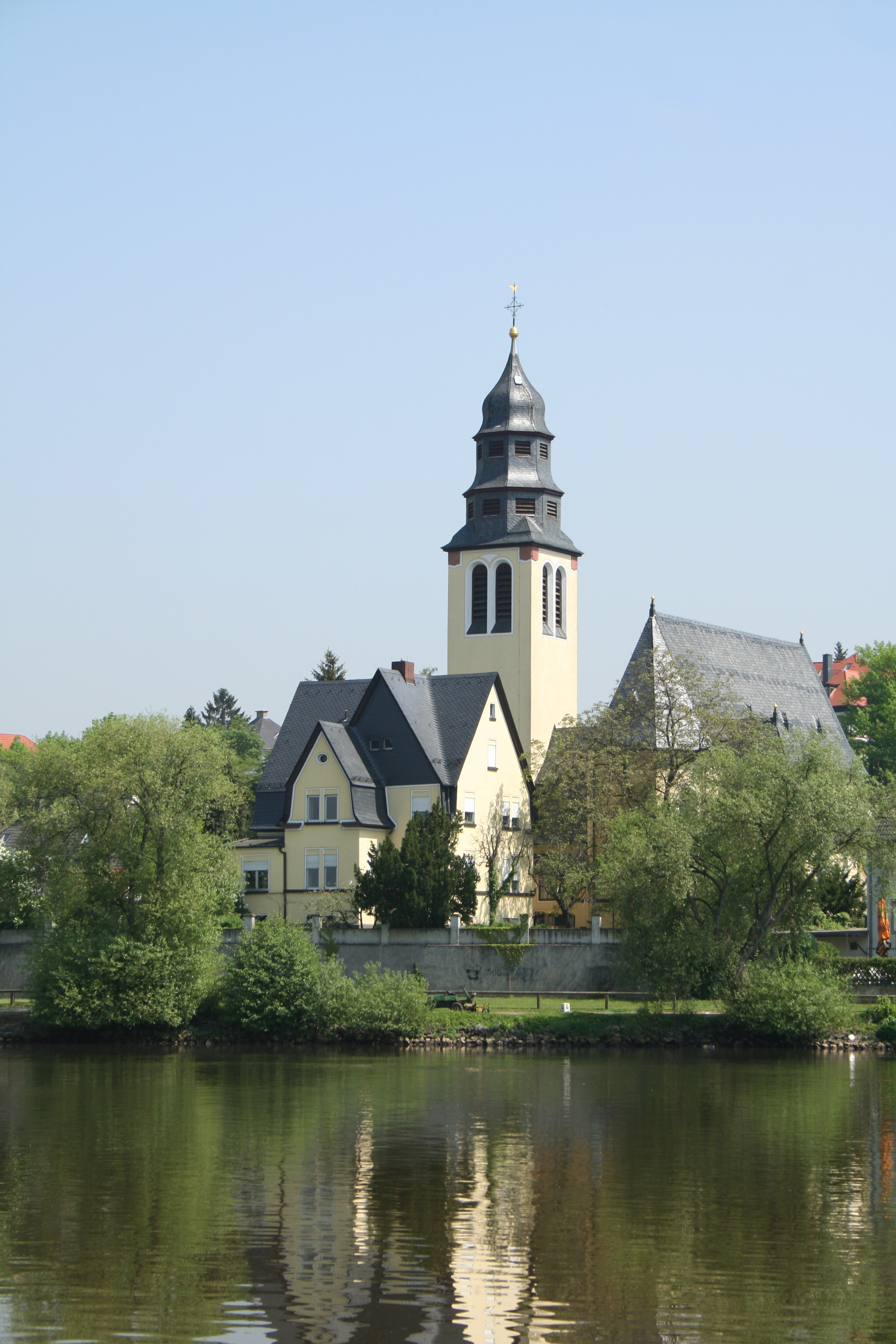
Neo-Baroque Catholic Heart of Jesus Church.

Landgrave Ernst-Ludwig planned to use Kelsterbach's advantageous location for transport to expand the village into a town of craftsmen, to which end from 1699 to 1712, the majestically designed Neukelsterbacher Straße (New Kelsterbach Street) was built, lined with two-storey living and working buildings where Calvinist refugees were to be settled. Manifold problems led to this project's failure. In the mid 18th century, Landgrave Ludwig VIII took over a previously private faïence factory to make it into a porcelain factory. The Meißen-trained porcelain painter Christian D. Busch was charged with its leadership. The best known porcelain artist working in Kelsterbach was Carl Vogelmann. The factory only lasted a few years.

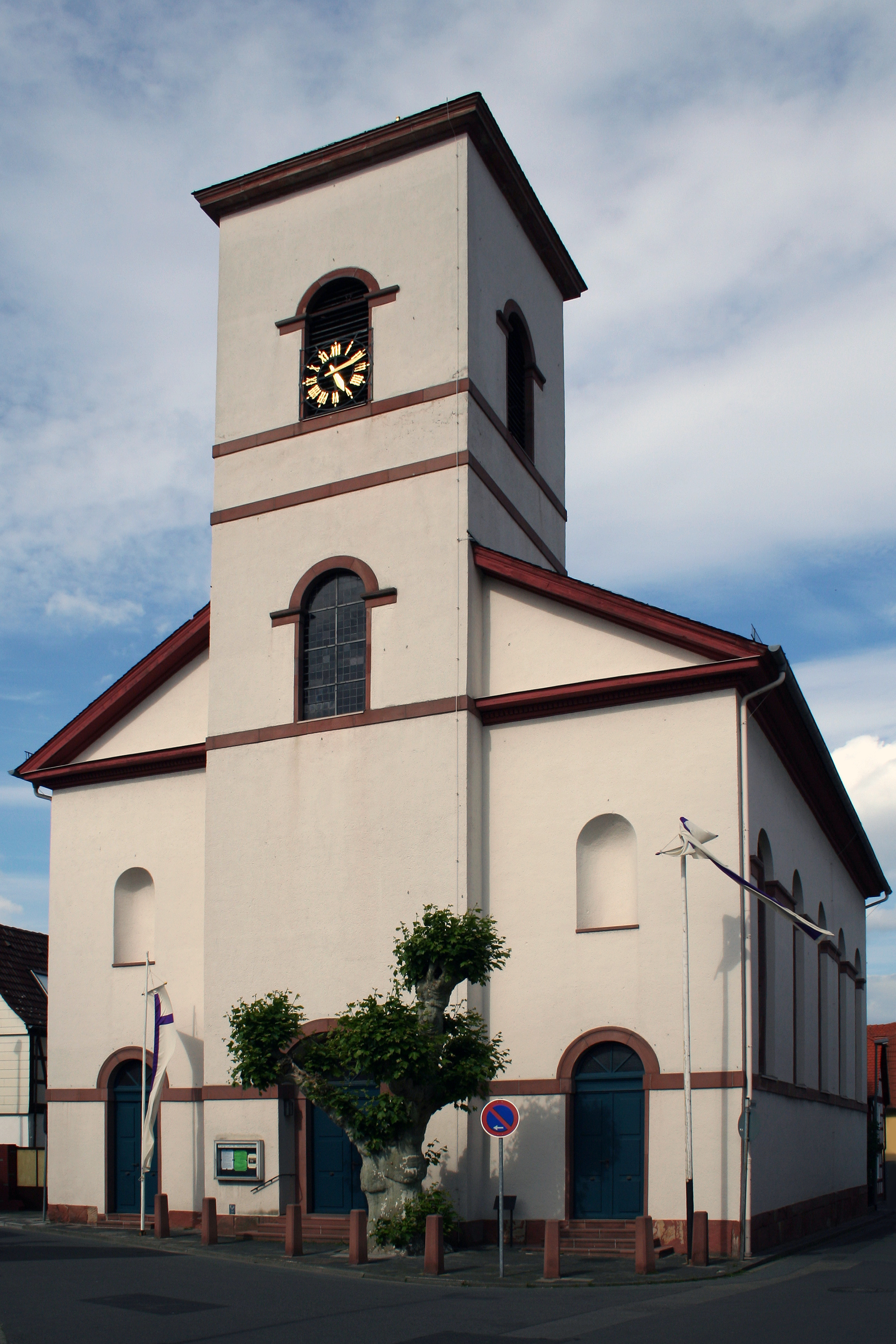
St. Martin's Evangelical Church.

In the Darmstadt governmental region of Groß-Gerau founded in 1821, which was already institutionalized as Groß-Gerau district by 1832, Kelsterbach was a bailiff's headquarters. From that time, Kelsterbach has had a common history with, and has always found itself under the same administration as, the Groß-Gerau district.

The village took a great step in its development when the railway carriage works was converted into the Vereinigte Kunstseidenfabrik ("United Rayon Factory"), later Vereinigte Glanzstoff AG. This factory then governed the village's – later town's – development for the better part of the next hundred years. At the time the factory went into operation, Kelsterbach had a population of roughly 3,000. The factory lasted until 2000 when it finally fell victim to globalization. There are great worries now as to what to do with the factory's old lands, a vast area right in the middle of town.

In the second half of the 20th century, the town lost quite a bit of its area to the gradually expanding airport on its southern limit. This development continues, bringing the town's independence ever more into question, as Kelsterbach is being more and more cut off from the rest of Groß-Gerau district.

In 1974, amalgamation with Frankfurt, which had been looming as part of Hesse's district reforms, was staved off for the time being when the town joined the Umlandverband Frankfurt, an intercommunal association.

Kelsterbach was granted town rights in 1952, together with Raunheim.

== Politics ==
=== Town council ===
Town council consists of 37 councillors. The municipal elections on 26 March 2006 yielded the following results:

- CDU 10 seats
- SPD 20 seats
- WIK 5 seats
- EUK 2 seats

Note: WIK and EUK are citizens' coalitions, with the former being "green"-oriented, and the latter being an initiative of EU foreigners.

=== Mayor ===
Kelsterbach's full-time mayor from 1997 to 2008 was the former administrative employee Erhard Engisch. Since 2008, Manfred Ockel has been mayor.

=== Coat of arms ===
Kelsterbach's civic coat of arms might heraldically be described thus: In sable an oak tree with four leaves argent and three acorns Or.

The tree stands for the Dreieich royal hunting woods (Dreieich means "Three Oaks" in German). The colours come from the arms borne by the Counts of Isenburg who ruled the village beginning in 1418. The arms were granted in 1925.

=== Town partnerships ===
- Baugé, département of Maine-et-Loire, France, since 31 August 1979

== Economy and infrastructure ==
=== Transport ===
Kelsterbach has an interchange on Autobahn A3. By way of Federal Highway (Bundesstraße) B40a and an Autobahn spur route, Autobahn A66 can be reached quickly. Also running through Kelsterbach is Federal Highway B43. Frankfurt S-Bahn lines S 8 and S 9 run from Kelsterbach station to the main railway station in Frankfurt within 15 minutes (four stops), and to the airport in only three minutes (one stop).

=== Infrastructure ===
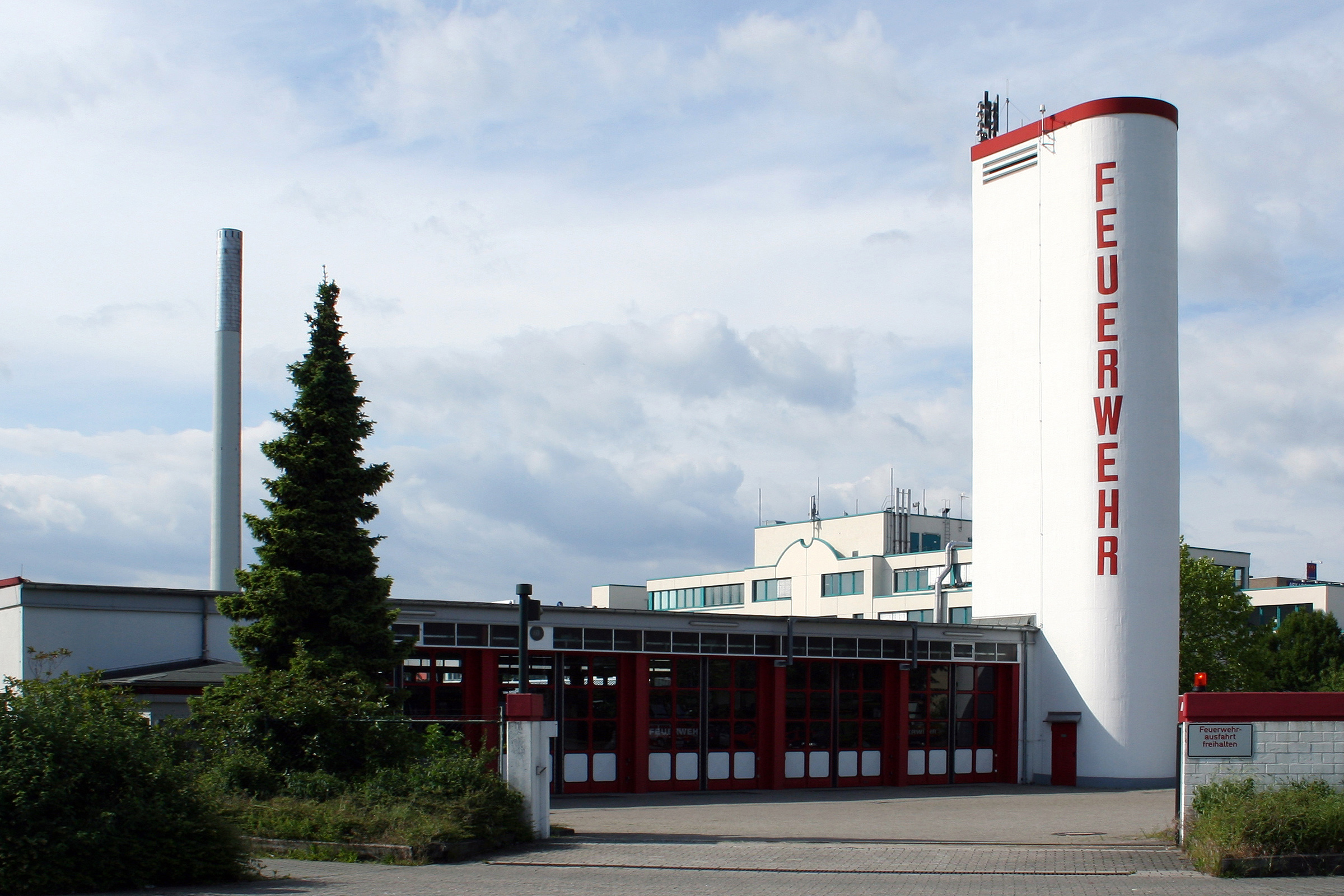
Kelsterbach fire station

In 1926, in the course of building the North-South Powerline, a great transformer station was built. This substation today handles voltages of 380, 220 and 110 kV.

Owing to the Frankfurt Airport's expansion, the power lines leading to the substation from the south have had to be relocated several times. Today, the wires are borne on low pylons, with all conductors at the same level, leading by the airport to the west. In preparation for building the Northwest Runway, the substation was being moved and modernized with gas insulated switchgear, power lines undergrounded or removed.

Kelsterbach has at its disposal a combination indoor and leisure swimming pool. Remodelling and modernization are planned for 2007. Furthermore, also at hand are one of Groß-Gerau district's biggest and most modern town libraries, an integrated comprehensive school, several primary schools, and a special school. Kelsterbach is the only municipality in Hesse that belongs to a district and yet has its own school board.

The seven kindergartens under church leadership are coordinated and financially supported by the town. The former stately home houses a youth centre.

At sporting grounds and municipal premises, there is a brisk club life (about 90 clubs and organizations). Aside from many cultural events, Kelsterbach is known for its traditional church fair (Kerb), and for its Old Town Festival (Altstadtfest).

Well developed shopping facilities are, besides food markets, hardly available.

Serving as local recreation areas are the well designed Main riverside, the South Park (Südpark), which is heavily frequented in summer, and an extensive town forest. Besides the Main riverside, these areas are being demanded by Fraport AG for the foreseen Frankfurt Airport expansion (as of April 2006).

== Education ==
Schools in the municipality include two primary schools, one comprehensive secondary school, and one special school:

- Bürgermeister-Hardt-Schule (elementary school)
- Karl-Treutel-Schule (elementary school)
- Integrierte Gesamtschule Kelsterbach or IGS-Kelsterbach (secondary school)
- Karl-Krolopper-Schule (special school)

The library is the Stadt-und Schulbibliothek, or the city and school library.
