= North–South Powerline =

Overhead power line in Germany and Austria

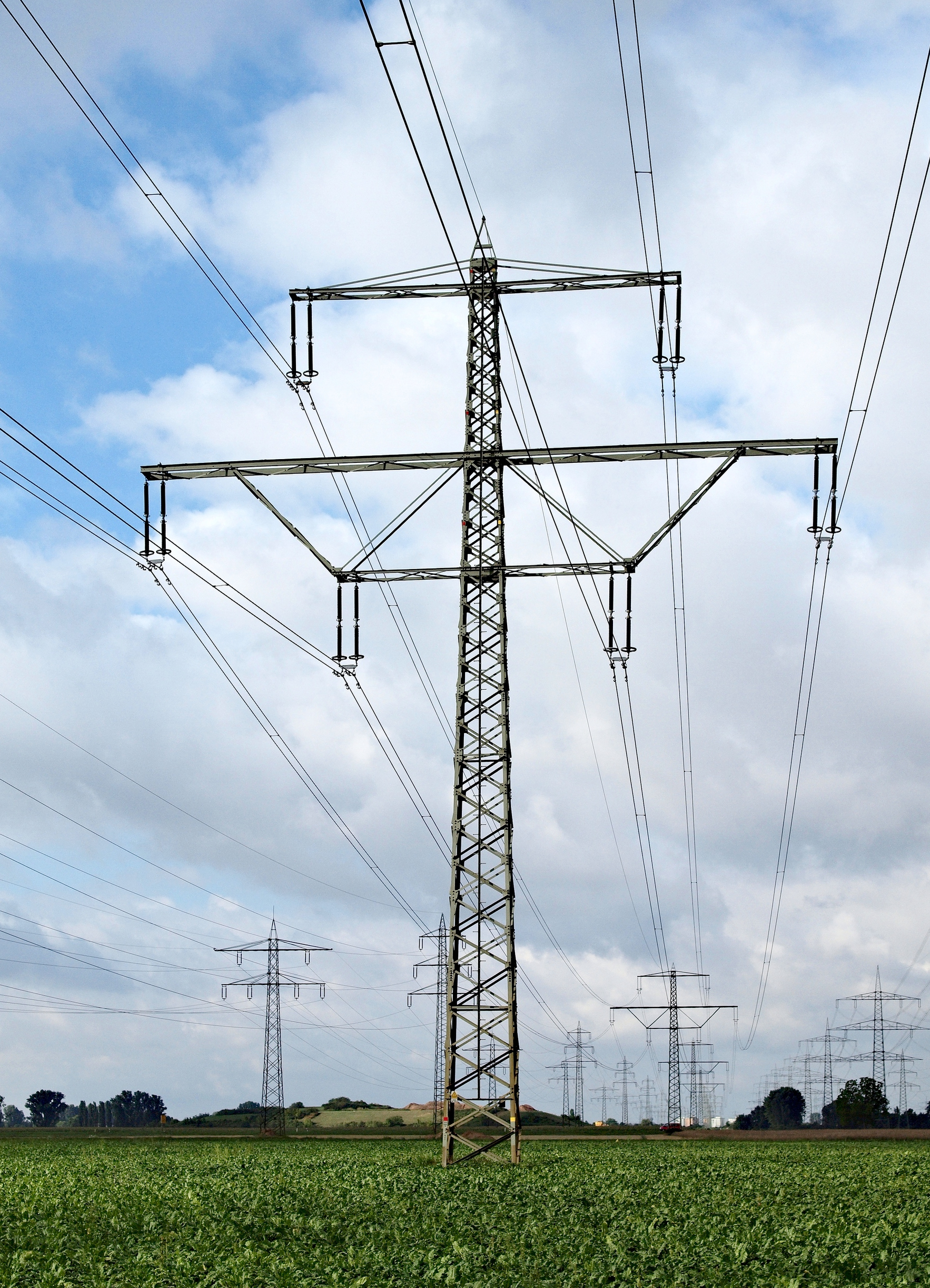
Typical pylon shape (C1 type) of the North-South Powerline, among several other lines

The North–South Powerline, or Nord-Süd-Leitung, is the world's oldest interconnection for electric current. It was built between 1924 and 1929 by RWE AG, to transport electricity produced in the hydro-electric power plants in Vorarlberg, Austria and the southern Black Forest to the Ruhr district.

The line begins in Bludenz and in Herbertingen connects with a second line, which comes from Tiengen. It continues to the transformer stations at Ludwigsburg-Hoheneck, Mannheim-Rheinau, Kelsterbach, Koblenz, and Bad Neuenahr to Brauweiler.

The entire line was originally installed on pylons with a three-tiered arrangement. With the exception of the Kelsterbach–Koblenz and Heilbronn–Neckarwestheim sections of the line, the North–South Powerline is still carried by the original masts. For the section which travels through Bad Neuenahr, Koblenz, Kelsterbach, Mannheim/Rheinau and Ludwigsburg/Hoheneck, C1-pylons are used; in other sections, C2 and C3 pylons are used, depending upon the need for the lines to withstand loads of ice during the winter.

In 1964, an electric circuit of the section traveling through Ludwigsburg/Hoheneck, Herbertingen and Tiengen switched over to 380 kV. In the section between the transformer stations Ludwigsburg–Hoheneck and Mannheim/Rheinau, an electric circuit was deemed to be dispensable in the year 2003. The two lowest conductors on this section of the line were dismantled between 10 November and 16 December 2003, to make better use of the land beneath the line route. The dispensable fourth conductor on the masts was left as an anchor.

To make space for the fourth runway of Frankfurt Airport, the section around Kelsterbach was removed in 2008.
