= Main Railway =

Railway in Germany

Overview
- Native name: Mainbahn
- Status: Operational
- Owner: Deutsche Bahn
- Line number: 3520 (Mainz–Frankfurt Hbf); 3650 (Frankfurt Stadion–Frankfurt Süd); 3538 (drittes Gl. Gustavsburg–Bischofsheim)
- Locale: Rhineland-Palatinate, Hesse, Germany
- Termini: Mainz Hbf; Frankfurt (Main) Hbf
- Stations: 12

Service
- Type: Heavy rail, Passenger/freight rail Regional rail, Commuter rail Intercity rail
- Route number: 471, 645.8, 645.9
- Operator(s): DB Regio, Rhein-Main S-Bahn

History
- Opened: 3 January 1863

Technical
- Line length: 37.5 km (23.3 mi)
- Number of tracks: Double track
- Track gauge: 1,435 mm (4 ft 8 1/2 in) standard gauge
- Electrification: 15 kV/16.7 Hz AC overhead catenary
- Operating speed: 160 km/h (99 mph)

The Main Railway (German: Mainbahn) is a 37.5 km-long double-track electrified railway line, which runs on the south side of the river Main from Mainz to Frankfurt central station.

== History ==
Immediately after the opening of the Rhine-Main Railway from Mainz to Aschaffenburg by the Hessian Ludwig Railway Company in 1858, it was anxious to also own a connection to Frankfurt. Therefore, it built the new line from a branch off the Rhine-Main line at Bischofsheim along the left (southern) bank of the Main to Frankfurt. It thereby put itself into competition with the parallel Taunus Railway, which runs on the right bank of the Main. The concession for building and operating the line was awarded by Grand Duchy of Hesse on 15 August 1861 and by the senate of the Free City of Frankfurt on 17 January 1862.

The building of the line took only one and a half years. A test run took place on 20 December 1862 and it was opened on 3 January 1863. The line originally ran through the former Forsthaus station and today's Friedensbrücke (Peace Bridge, now a road bridge) in Frankfurt across the Main to the former Main-Neckar station. This entry was replaced on 16 January 1882 by the current alignment through Goldstein station (later: Frankfurt-Sportfeld, now: Frankfurt (Main) Stadion), Niederrad station and the Niederräder Main bridge.

On 1 February 1897, it along with the rest of the Hessian Ludwigs railway became part of the Prussian-Hessian Railway Company. Electrification of the line was completed on 15 December 1958.

On 2 February 1990, one of the worst train accidents in the Rhine-Main area occurred near Rüsselsheim when a train from Frankfurt collided with one from Wiesbaden and derailed, killing 17 people and injuring over 80, some seriously.

Since 1999 the Raunheim Mönchwald–Raunheim Mönchhof connecting curve has provided a connection with the Cologne–Frankfurt high-speed rail line, allowing long-distance trains to and from on the Left Rhine line to use the Frankfurt Airport long-distance station.

== Buildings ==
The following structures are original and those marked are listed monuments:

Location	Building	Year	km	Monument
Bischofsheim	Station building	1958	8.25	*
Rüsselsheim	Linesmen house	1863	12.80	*
Raunheim	Station building	1863	15.87	*
Raunheim	Linesmen house	1863	17.39	*
Kelsterbach	Rail bridge	1863	21.75	
Kelsterbach	Linesmen house	1863	23.60	*
Kelsterbach	Station building	1863	23.81	*
Stadion	Station building	1879	31.37	*
Niederrad	Station building	1882	33.19	*
Sachsenhausen	Rail bridge	1864	34.47	

== Services ==
The Main Railway is used by long-distance and local passenger services as well as freight traffic,

=== Long distance ===
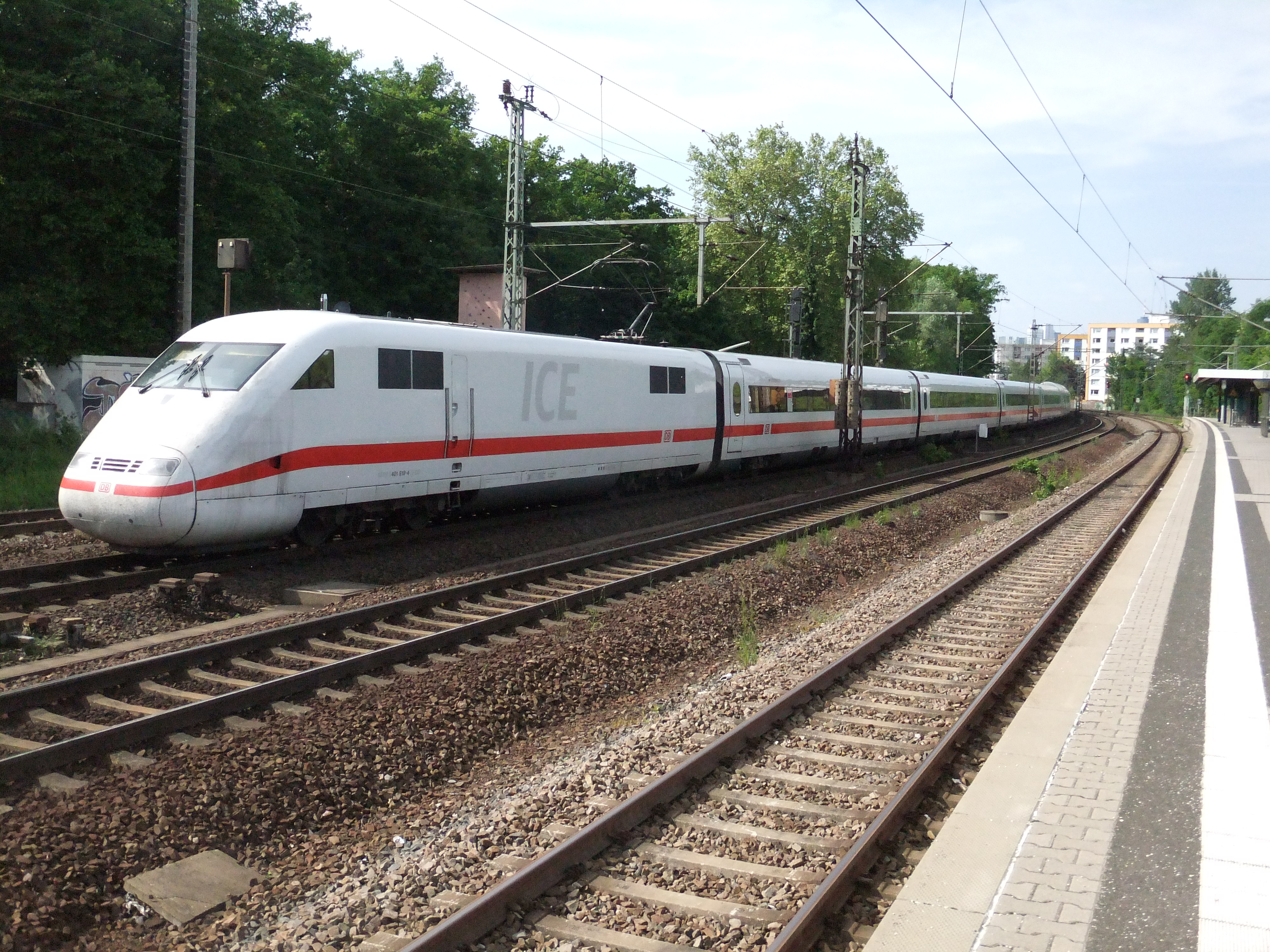
ICE 1 on the connecting curve from the Main Railway in Frankfurt-Louisa station

The line is used by "individual services" (not at regular intervals through the day) of ICE lines 20, 31, 50 and 91 as well as IC line 31.

The long-distance services depart from Mainz Hauptbahnhof, passing through Raunheim Mönchwald junction via the connecting line to the Cologne-Frankfurt high-speed railway to Frankfurt Airport long-distance station.

From here trains run non-stop to Frankfurt am Main Stadion station and via the current route to Frankfurt South station or via the current route to Frankfurt (Main) Hauptbahnhof. A few trains use the Mannheim–Frankfurt railway to Mannheim Hauptbahnhof.

=== Local services ===
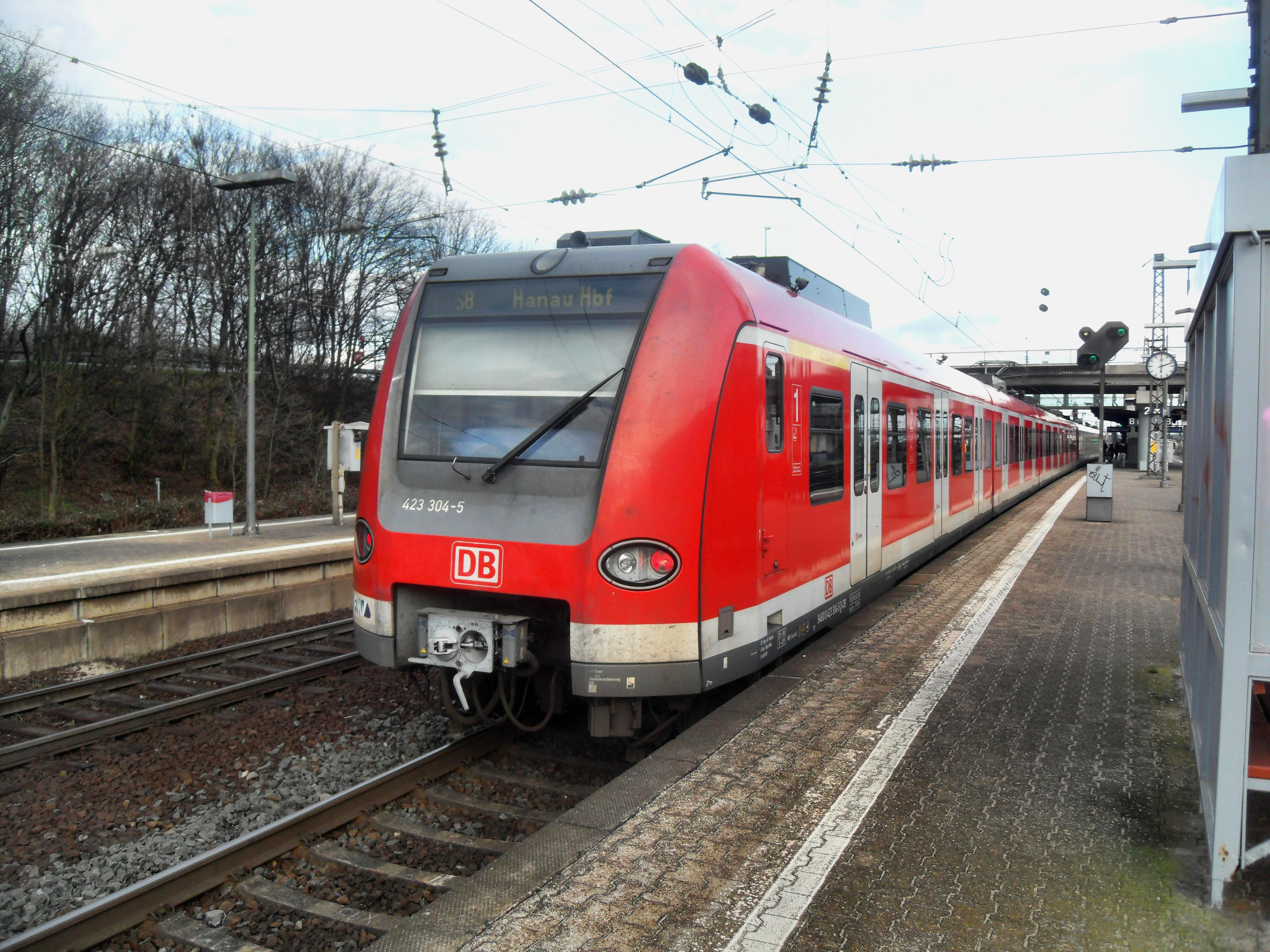
S8 service in Mainz-Bischofsheim station running towards Hanau Hbf

Regional and Rhine-Main S-Bahn services run between Kelsterbach station and Frankfurt-Schwanheim Fernbahn junction over the Airport loop.

Line	Route	Frequency
RE 55	Frankfurt Airport regional – Frankfurt South – Offenbach – Hanau – Aschaffenburg	Individual services
RB 75	Wiesbaden – Mainz – Mainz-Bischofsheim – Darmstadt	60 min
RE 2/3	Koblenz or Saarbrücken – Mainz – Mainz-Bischofsheim – Frankfurt Airport regional – Frankfurt (Main) Hbf	60 min
S8 (Rhine-Main S-Bahn)	Wiesbaden – Mainz – Mainz-Bischofsheim – Kelsterbach – Frankfurt Airport regional – Frankfurt (Main) Hbf (underground) – Frankfurt City Tunnel – Offenbach City Tunnel – Hanau	30 min
S9 (Rhine-Main S-Bahn)	Wiesbaden – Mainz-Kastel – Mainz-Bischofsheim – Kelsterbach – Frankfurt Airport regional – Frankfurt (Main) Hbf (underground) – Frankfurt City Tunnel – Offenbach City Tunnel – Hanau	30 min
