= Rüsselsheim station =

Railway station in Rüsselsheim am Main, Germany

Rüsselsheim
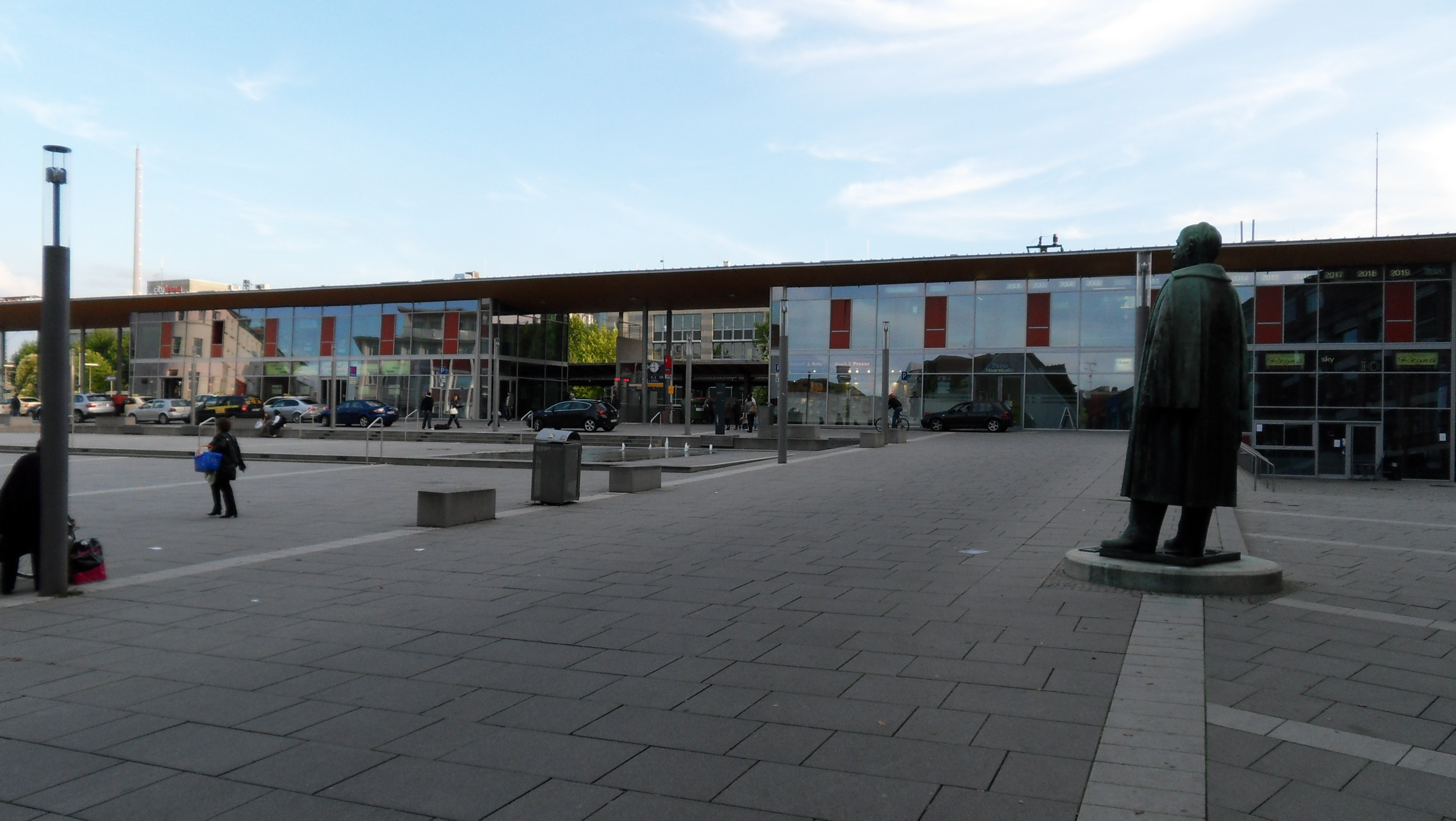

General information
- Location: Rüsselsheim, Hesse; Germany
- Coordinates: 49°59′30″N 8°24′50″E
- Owner: Deutsche Bahn
- Operator: DB Netz; DB Station&Service
- Lines: Main Railway (km 23.8) (KBS 645.8/645.9/655
- Platforms: 3
- Connections: 1 6 11 22 24 31 32 41 42 46 51 52 61 67 70 71 72 81 83

Construction
- Accessible: Yes

Other information
- Station code: 5440
- DS100 code: FKCH
- IBNR: 8005220
- Category: 3
- Fare zone: : 3730
- Website: www.bahnhof.de

History
- Opened: 1863

Passengers
- 2,000

Services
Preceding station	DB Regio Mitte	Following station
Mainz-Bischofsheim towards Koblenz Hbf	RE 2 Südwest-Express	Frankfurt Airport regional towards Frankfurt (Main) Hbf
Preceding station	Vlexx	Following station
Mainz-Bischofsheim towards Saarbrücken Hbf	RE 3	Frankfurt Airport regional towards Frankfurt (Main) Hbf
Preceding station	Hessische Landesbahn	Following station
Rüsselsheim Opelwerk towards Koblenz Hbf	RB 58	Frankfurt Airport long-distance towards Frankfurt (Main) Hbf
Preceding station	Rhine-Main S-Bahn	Following station
Rüsselsheim-Opelwerk towards Wiesbaden Hbf	S8 (Rhine-Main S-Bahn)	Raunheim towards Hanau Hbf
Rüsselsheim-Opelwerk towards Wiesbaden Hbf	S9 (Rhine-Main S-Bahn)	Raunheim towards Hanau Hbf
Location

Rüsselsheim station is a transit station in the town of Rüsselsheim am Main in the German state of Hesse on the Main Railway from Mainz to Frankfurt am Main. It is classified by Deutsche Bahn as a category 3 station. The station is served by the Rhine-Main S-Bahn and by regional trains. There is another station in Rüsselsheim, Rüsselsheim-Opelwerk station, which is served by S-Bahn trains only.

The station was opened in 1863. The Rüsselsheim train disaster occurred near the station on 2 February 1990, killing 17 persons and severely injuring 145.

== Services ==
Rüsselsheim lies in the area served by the Rhein-Main-Verkehrsverbund (Rhine-Main Transport Association, RMV). It is used by Rhine-Main S-Bahn trains operated by DB Regio and buses.

=== Trains ===
Services on lines S8 and S9 each operate at 30-minute intervals on the Wiesbaden Hauptbahnhof–Hanau Hauptbahnhof route. Together the two lines operate at 15-minute intervals through Rüsselsheim. Line S8 runs through Mainz Hauptbahnhof to Wiesbaden Hauptbahnhof, while line S9 runs via Kostheim Bridge to Mainz-Kastel and Wiesbaden Hauptbahnhof.

Rüsselsheim station is also served by Regional-Express trains running between Koblenz Hauptbahnhof and Frankfurt (the Mittelrhein-Main-Express, RE 2) and between Saarbrücken Hauptbahnhof and Frankfurt (Rhein-Nahe-Express, RE 3), each running every two hours, resulting in an approximately hourly service as far as Mainz. In the peak hours there are a few Regionalbahn services to Idar-Oberstein and to Bingen Hauptbahnhof. Hessische Landesbahn also operates an hourly service (RE 58) from Rüsselsheim Opelwerk to Frankfurt Airport, Frankfurt South, Hanau, Aschaffenburg and Laufach.

=== Buses ===
Rüsselsheim station has a large bus station. It is served by city bus routes 6, 11, 31, 32, 41, 42, 51, and 52, and regional bus line 1 to Flörsheim (Main) station. Rüsselsheim Bahnhof Südseite bus stop to the south of the station is served by routes L1, 22, 24, 28, 72, and 752.
