= Kelsterbach station =

Railway station in Kelsterbach, Germany

Kelsterbach
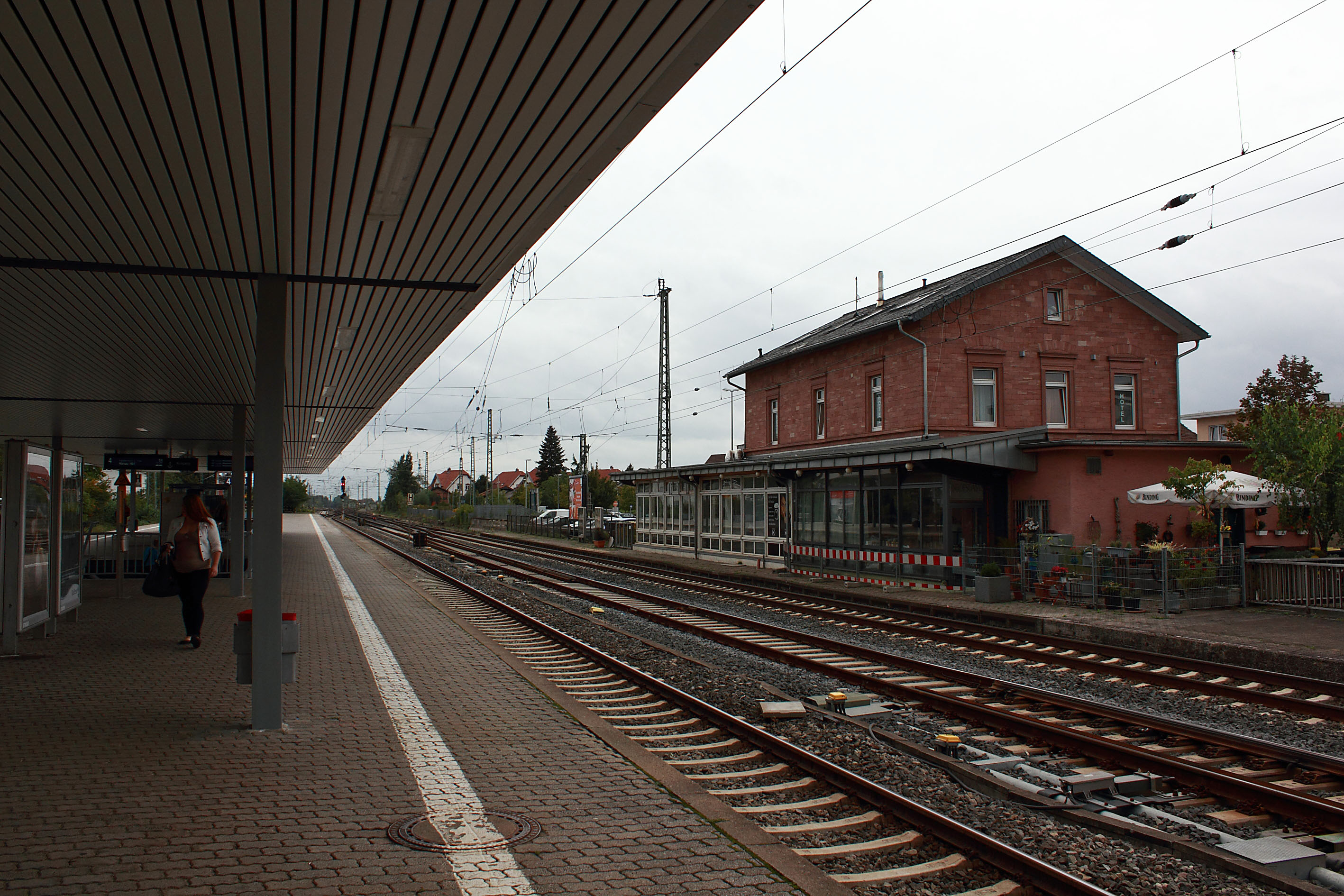
- Platforms and entrance building

General information
- Location: Kelsterbach, Hesse; Germany
- Coordinates: 50°03′45″N 8°31′46″E
- Owner: Deutsche Bahn
- Operator: DB Netz; DB Station&Service
- Lines: Main Railway (23.8 km) (KBS 645.8/645.9/655); Frankfurt Airport loop (15.8 km) (KBS 645.8/645.9)
- Platforms: 3 (1 unused)

Construction
- Accessible: Yes

Other information
- Station code: 3152
- DS100 code: FKCH
- Category: 5
- Fare zone: : 3755
- Website: www.bahnhof.de

History
- Opened: 1863

Services
Preceding station	Rhine-Main S-Bahn	Following station
Raunheim towards Wiesbaden Hbf	S8 (Rhine-Main S-Bahn)	Frankfurt Airport Regional towards Hanau Hbf
Raunheim towards Wiesbaden Hbf	S9 (Rhine-Main S-Bahn)	Frankfurt Airport Regional towards Hanau Hbf
Location

Kelsterbach station is the station of the town of Kelsterbach in the German state of Hesse on the Main Railway (German: Mainbahn) from Mainz to Frankfurt. The station is classified by Deutsche Bahn as a category 5 station.

== History ==
Kelsterbach station was built in 1863 at the intersection of the national roads to Mörfelden and Rüsselsheim, at the 23.8 km point of the Main Railway. Since the rail line was built north of the edge of the Kelsterbach fluvial terrace, it was well outside the centre of the village when it was opened. Since 1972, a line has branched off here towards Frankfurt Airport Regional station. Lines S8 and S9 of the Rhine-Main S-Bahn now stop at a modern centrally located covered platform.

== Reception building ==
The entrance building was built in 1863. It is still almost in its original condition and is built in the standard style of the Hessian Ludwig Railway (Hessische Ludwigsbahn). Raunheim station is identical. It is built of red sandstone on a rectangular ground plan as a symmetrical two-story building covered by a gabled roof. The ground floor contained the main hall and a waiting room. In the basement there was a service room and rooms for handling freight. The upper floor housed the apartment of the stationmaster. In front of it is a southern extension with function rooms. The historic station building is now no longer for rail purposes; instead it houses a restaurant. The entrance building is a monument under the Hessian Monument Protection Act.

== Services ==
Kelsterbach lies in the area served by the Rhein-Main-Verkehrsverbund (Rhine-Main Transport Association, RMV). It is used by Rhine-Main S-Bahn trains operated by DB Regio, and buses.

=== S-Bahn ===
Services on lines S8 and S9 each operate at 30-minute intervals on the Wiesbaden Hauptbahnhof–Hanau Hauptbahnhof route. Together the two lines operate at 15-minute intervals through Kelsterbach. In the peak hours a few S-Bahn services run from Kelsterbach to Frankfurt Hauptbahnhof or vice versa. The station platforms are not accessible for the disabled.

=== Buses ===
Kelsterbach station is served by local bus lines 68, GG-72, and GG-73, and night bus line N81.
