= Kelster =

River in Germany

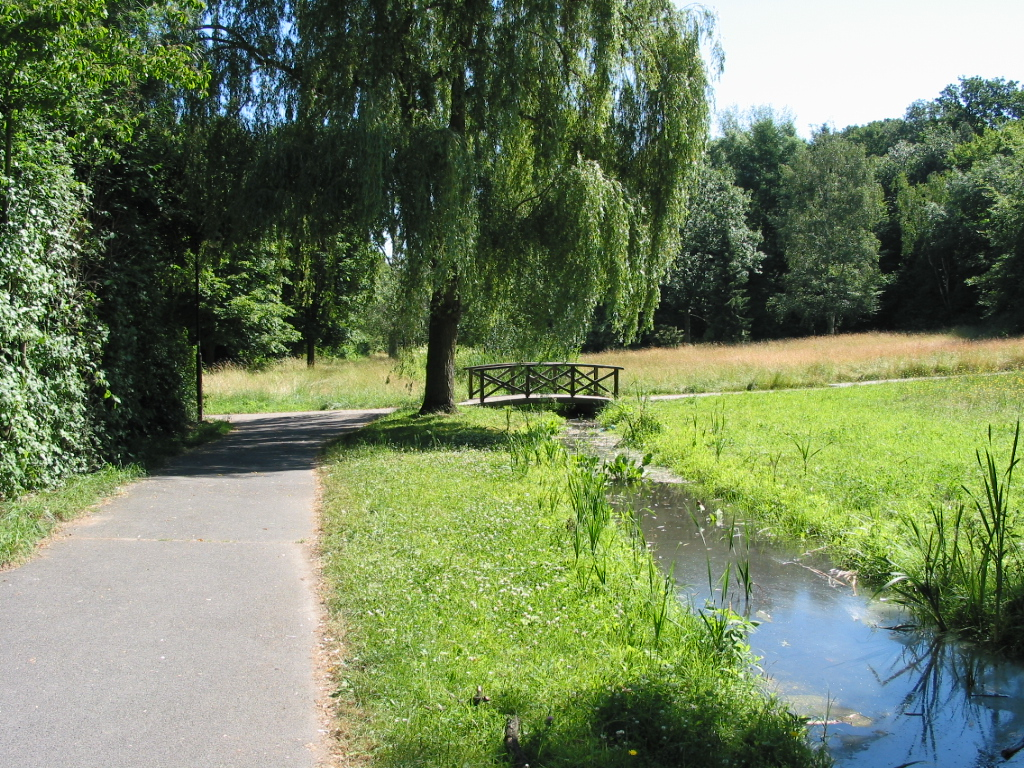

Location
- Country: Germany
- States: Hesse

Physical characteristics
- Mouth
  - location: Main
  - coordinates: 50°03′59″N 8°31′42″E

Basin features
- Progression: Main→ Rhine→ North Sea

Kelster is a small river of Hesse, Germany. It flows into the Main in Kelsterbach.

== See also ==
- List of rivers of Hesse
