= Frankfurt Airport loop =

Railway line in Germany

Overview
- Native name: Flughafenschleife Frankfurt
- Line number: 3683
- Locale: Hesse, Germany

Service
- Route number: 645.8, 645.9

Technical
- Line length: 15.8 km (9.8 mi)
- Track gauge: 1,435 mm (4 ft 8 1/2 in) standard gauge
- Electrification: 15 kV/16.7 Hz AC overhead catenary
- Operating speed: 120 km/h (75 mph)
- Maximum incline: approximately 3.6%

The Frankfurt Airport loop (German: Flughafenschleife Frankfurt) is a 15.8-kilometre-long (9.8-mile) double-track railway line connecting Frankfurt and Frankfurt Airport and operated as part of the Frankfurt S-Bahn. It is electrified at 15 kV/16.7 Hz.

The line was built in two stages between 1968 and 1980 and has since been mainly used by S-Bahn services.

== Route ==
The airport S-Bahn connects the S-Bahn network of the city of Frankfurt am Main from Frankfurt Hauptbahnhof with Frankfurt Airport and Kelsterbach. The connecting line runs on the surface to the airport area, where it runs in a tunnel.

The core of the line is an approximately 2.2 kilometre-long tunnel. On the double-track section, the tunnel is 8.80 metres wide and its height above the railhead is 5.50 metres and the track spacing is 4.00 metres.

On the west side of the station, a future connection is planned for an air freight centre.

The airport loop involves a detour of 2.1 kilometres compared to the direct line from Frankfurt Stadion to Kelsterbach.

== Services ==
S-Bahn services S8 and S9 and Regional-Express services RE2 and RE3 run on the line. The S-Bahn operates at 15-minute intervals to Wiesbaden either via Mainz or via Mainz-Kastel and in the opposite direction to Hanau via Frankfurt Hauptbahnhof underground, the city tunnels of Frankfurt and Offenbach and Offenbach Ost.

Regional services run hourly to Koblenz (RE2, via Mainz and Bingen) or Saarbrücken (RE3, via Mainz and Idar-Oberstein). In the opposite direction, the regional services run to Frankfurt Hauptbahnhof.

== History ==
According to Deutsche Bundesbahn (DB), it had long been interested in the provision of a connection from Frankfurt Airport to the rail network in 1969. However, due to a lack of funds and a lack of understanding of the necessity of the measure, the plan could not have taken shape until then.

With the advent of jet aircraft, the number of aircraft movements at Frankfurt Airport increased by 8 percent per year between 1965 and 1970, while the number of passengers increased on average by 19 percent per year. In 1971, the airport passed the 10 million passenger mark. 24 million passengers were projected in 1980 and 30 million in 1985. It was forecast that about 30 to 35 percent of passengers and airport workers would use an airport railway. Three to four thousand passengers were expected in the peak hour, the sum of both directions. The forecasts were revised downward in 1972 to 17.5 million passengers in 1979.

=== Planning and construction ===
The Federal Transport Policy Program (Verkehrspolitische Programm der Bundesregierung) of 1967 (known as the Leber Plan), according to DB information, inspired the planning and financing of the Frankfurt Airport railway. In June 1968, the railway division (Bundesbahndirektion) of Frankfurt am Main received planning approval for the airport railway. A 7.5 kilometre-long new line with an approximately 1.5 kilometre-long tunnel was planned. In total, 17 new bridges were planned along the line.

On 18 April 1969, Deutsche Bundesbahn and the FAG airport company concluded a financing agreement for connecting the airport to the railway network.

At the end of 1971, Deutsche Bundesbahn announced that it was bringing forward the opening of the airport railway, at least for the section between the Hauptbahnhof and the airport, from autumn 1972 to spring 1972. The total length of the new line between the junction at Frankfurt Sportfeld (now Frankfurt Stadion) and the junction at Kelsterbach, was 7.5 km.

According to the planning status of 1971, two trains per hour and direction would operate and, after the upgrade of S-Bahn tracks towards Frankfurt, operations would be run at 10-minute intervals. Long-distance trains would not normally be routed through the airport. The estimated cost of the project was estimated to be DM 94 million in 1968 and around DM 100 million in 1971.

=== Commissioning ===
Commissioning took place on 14 March 1972. In the summer 1972 timetable, 48 local services ran every working day on the line. Due to high track utilisation between Schwanheim junction and Frankfurt Hauptbahnhof, no regular-interval could be offered initially; there were irregular gaps of up to 60 minutes. According to traffic forecasts, an increase in services would be needed from 1978 at the latest. A regular-interval service of six S-Bahn services per hour and direction was considered necessary. 12,500 passengers per day were counted in August 1972, rising to 15,500 in the summer of 1975. At the beginning of operations there was no connection towards Kelsterbach/Mainz. All trains from the airport ended at the Hauptbahnhof, as the extension into the city centre had been cancelled.

=== Second construction stage ===
In a second stage, between 1976 and 1979, separate tracks were built for S-Bahn operations between Kleyerstraße junction and Schwanheim, with a new bridge over the Main. The 6.97 kilometre-long section of new S-Bahn line separates from the S-Bahn main line at Kleyerstraße junction about two kilometres west of the concourse at the Hauptbahnhof. It then crosses two ramps over the railway from Frankfurt-Höchst with grades of up to 3.6%. It then passes over the New Niederrad Bridge and through Frankfurt-Niederrad station until shortly before Stadion station it connects with the line opened in 1972 to the west of the existing tracks. A 210-metre-long platform was built in Sportfeld station as part of the work.

The construction was completed three months earlier than planned at the start of work. Scheduled operations commenced at the change to the winter timetable on 30 September 1979. Since no extensive timetable changes were required for operational reasons for the winter timetable, the operation of a full service commenced on 1 June 1980. It provided a ten-minute cycle with two S-Bahn lines (S14: Frankfurt–Mainz–Wiesbaden and S15: Hauptwache–Airport), amounting to 93 S-Bahn trains per day and direction. The travel time between the airport and the Hauptbahnhof was reduced by the new infrastructure from 18 to 20 minutes to 11 minutes.

In October 1975, the fundamental agreement for the "Development of the Airport S-Bahn including a second Niederrad Bridge" (Ausbau der Flughafen-S-Bahn einschließlich einer zweiten Niederräder Brücke) was made on the basis of the Municipal Transport Financing Act (Gemeindeverkehrsfinanzierungsgesetz) of 1972. Accordingly, the federal government financed 60 percent of the eligible costs of the local transport project and the rest was financed by the state of Hesse. Deutsche Bundesbahn financed the costs for additional S-Bahn multiple unit trains (class 420) and the costs for planning and construction supervision.

At the end of 1979, 20,000 passengers per day were counted on the line. The track infrastructure between Stadion and Kelsterbach were renewed during a three-week track closure in July 2007.

== Gateway Gardens ==
Between 22 February 2016 and 19 December 2019, a replacement line is being built between the Airport regional station and Stadion station to serve Gateway Gardens station and connect to the northern edge of the surrounding Gateway Gardens new development area, at a cost of €223 million. The new section would branch off the existing line at line-kilometre 6.645 (construction-kilometre 0.0) and cross the Main Railway over a new flying junction. A double-track tunnel is planned between construction-kilometres 1.956 and 2.876 and the new halt of Gateway Gardens will follow at construction-kilometre 3.188. Further on another tunnel is provided at construction-kilometre 3.870. At construction-kilometre 3.996, the new line would meet the existing line at line-kilometre 10.5 in the existing tunnel. The existing airport tunnel is to be upgraded on the reused section. The existing line is then to be completely rebuilt between line-kilometres 6.8 and 10.5, including the connecting track to the Main Railway. The plans were put on public exhibition from 13 August to 12 September 2012. There were three objections, which were discussed on 18 January 2013. A supplementary planning procedure was carried out in the same year. Planning permission was given on 31 January 2014. Preparatory measures have been carried out since the end of 2014 and were completed in early 2016. Deutsche Bahn announced in mid-March 2014 that it would call tenders for the construction of the 4.2 kilometre section on 15 September 2014. About half of the new section of line would run in tunnel (open-cut construction) and half in the open.

== Future plans ==
A regional rail project called Regionaltangente West (regional tangent west) is being developed which would connect Neu-Isenburg with Bad Homburg and the NordWestZentrum shopping centre through the western fringes of Frankfurt. This would use part of the Airport loop and would branch of it before the curve to Kelsterbach station.
