= Raunheim =

- Town
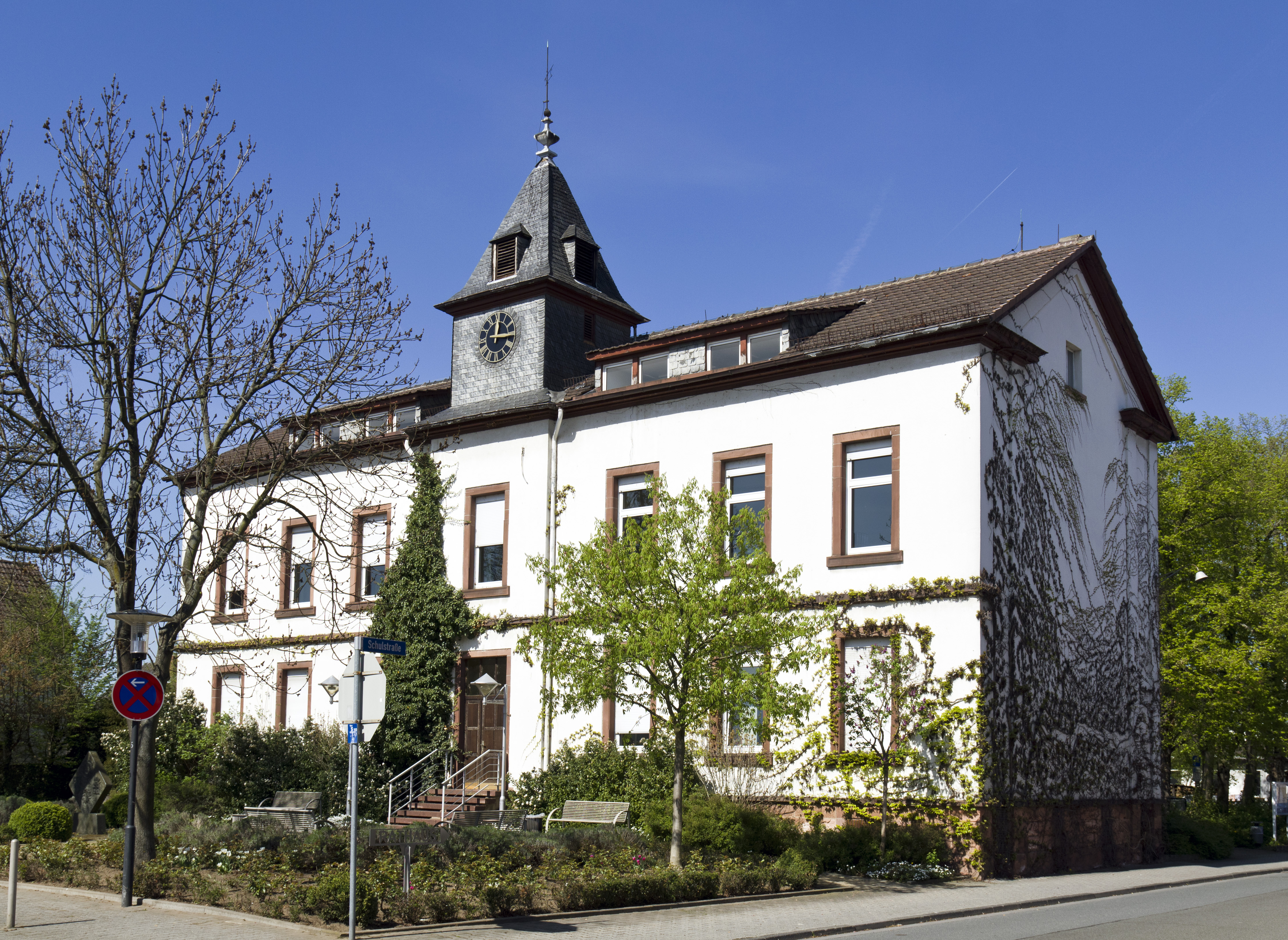
- Town hall

- Coat of arms

- Location of Raunheim within Groß-Gerau district
- Interactive map of Raunheim
- Location within Germany Location within Hesse
- Coordinates: 50°01′N 08°27′E
- Country: Germany
- State: Hesse
- Admin. region: Darmstadt
- District: Groß-Gerau

Government
  - Mayor (2023–29): David Rendel (SPD)

Area
  - Total: 12.6 km^{2} (4.9 sq mi)
- Elevation: 89.5 m (294 ft)

Population (2025-12-31)
  - Total: 15,155
  - Density: 1,200/km^{2} (3,120/sq mi)
- Time zone: UTC+01:00 (CET)
  - Summer (DST): UTC+02:00 (CEST)
- Postal codes: 65479
- Dialling codes: 06142
- Vehicle registration: GG
- Website: www.raunheim.de

Raunheim (German pronunciation: [ˈʁaʊnˌhaɪm]) is a town in Groß-Gerau district in Hesse, Germany and a part of the Frankfurt Urban Region as well as the Frankfurt Rhein-Main Region.

== Geography ==
=== Location ===
Raunheim lies in the Frankfurt Rhein-Main Region between Frankfurt am Main (24 km southwest of downtown) and Mainz on the south bank of the Main, 3 km northeast of Rüsselsheim.

=== Neighbouring communities ===
Raunheim borders in the north on the towns of Hattersheim am Main (Main-Taunus-Kreis) and Kelsterbach, in the east on the district-free city of Frankfurt am Main, in the south on the town of Rüsselsheim, and in the west on the town of Flörsheim am Main (Main-Taunus-Kreis).

=== Constituent communities ===
Raunheim consists of only one constituent community.

== History ==
In 1425 Count John IV. of Katzenelnbogen bought the villages Seilfurt und Raunheim for 5000 florin from the Lords of Eppstein.

== Population development ==
- 1852: 644
- 1875: 700
- 1895: 1.005
- 1910: 1.931
- 1939: 3.151
- 1946: 3.688
- 1961: 6.140
- 1967: 12.388
- 2015: 15.636

In 2011 more than half of Raunheim's inhabitants were migrants. According to census data from that year Raunheim and Dietzenbach also had the highest shares of Muslim migrants in Hesse and Germany.

== Politics ==
=== Town council ===
The town council for Raunheim consists of 31 councillors.

Elections in 2016:

- SPD = 16
- CDU = 7
- GRÜNE = 4
- FDP = 3
- FNR = 1

=== Mayors since 1947 ===
- 1947 Heinrich Schneiker (SPD)
- 1949 Adam Wildmeister (CDU)
- 1955 Erwin Lang (SPD)
- 1969 Günther Diehl (SPD)
- 1988 Herbert Haas (SPD)
- 2000 Thomas Jühe (SPD)
- 2023 David Rendel (SPD)

=== Coat of arms ===
Raunheim's civic coat of arms have no clear meaning. The charge in the arms is first known from a document dating from 1625. The seal used on the document likely dates back further. The ringlike charge is also seen on 18th-century town limit markers. The arms were granted in 1926.

== Town partnerships ==
Raunheim maintains partnership links with the following towns:

- Le Teil, France
- Trofarello, Italy

== Economy and infrastructure ==
The town's advantageous location on the Main and near the airport and Autobahn led to quick growth after the Second World War (1945 population: 3,600) and to its becoming an important industrial location. Several thousand jobs are set to arise soon on the former Caltex refinery's old lands. The aerospace division of the multinational corporation Honeywell is based in Raunheim.

== Transport ==
The interchange on Autobahn A 3 is about 2 km away. Frankfurt International Airport lies 8 km away. Raunheim also has S-Bahn connections to Frankfurt, Mainz and Wiesbaden.

With the city being on the airport approach, with certain wind conditions (officially: operational direction 07), the approaching aircraft fly about 300 m over the town, reaching a noise level of 70 dB, peaking at 90 dB, making Raunheim the airport area community most strongly affected by aircraft noise. This has led the town to develop a noise reduction plan. A citizen initiative is fighting against airport expansion.

== Sport and leisure ==
Raunheim is home to a bathing lake, located right at the edge of the forest.
