= Reiner Protsch =

German anthropologist

- Born: 14 January 1939 (age 87); Berlin, Germany
- Education: UCLA
- Scientific career
- Fields: Anthropology
- Workplaces: University of Frankfurt

Reiner Protsch (von Zieten), born 14 January 1939 in Berlin, is a German anthropologist who published allegedly erroneous carbon dating data of human fossils.

Protsch's fraud, which ended his 30-year-old academic career, was announced in February 2005 after it was discovered that he made up data and plagiarized the works of others. His misdeeds also included an attempt to destroy the University of Frankfurt's archives and to sell the institution's chimpanzee skull collection.

Concern regarding the anthropologist's works emerged during routine investigation conducted by Thomas Terberger and Martin Street. The scientists sought to guarantee the authenticity of the fossil samples that Protsch had dated. Their findings, which were based on the fossil reanalysis completed at Oxford University's Radiocarbon Accelerator Unit, revealed wrong dating for the Hahnhöfersand Man, Binshof-Speyer Woman, and the Paderborn-Sande Man. The University of Frankfurt launched an investigation after the publication of Terberger and Street's report. It later found that throughout Protsch's career as a professor of anthropology at the university, he had plagiarized the works of colleagues and systematically misdated numerous stone age fossils. Protsch's falsified works forced the revision of some 30 millennia's worth of human history as well as the knowledge of human evolution.

The German publication Der Spiegel also reported that Protsch lied about his background, having previously claimed he had ties to Prussian aristocracy.
