= Frankfurt Airport regional station =

Underground railway station in Frankfurt, Germany

Frankfurt am Main Flughafen Regionalbahnhof
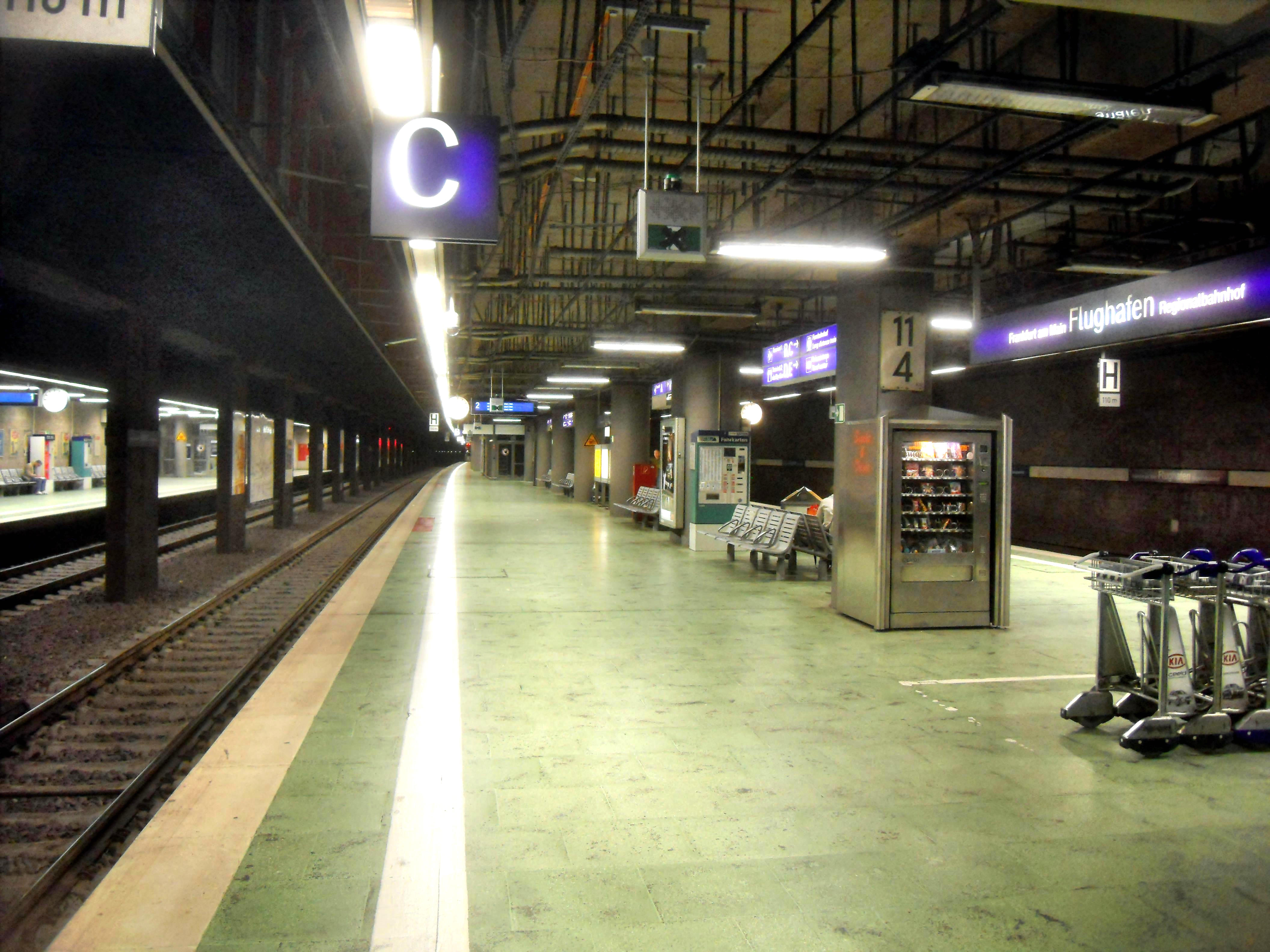
- Underground platforms

General information
- Location: Hugo-Eckener-Ring 1, Frankfurt, Hesse; Germany
- Coordinates: 50°3′7″N 8°34′14″E
- Owner: Deutsche Bahn
- Operator: DB InfraGO
- Line: Frankfurt Airport loop (645.8, 645.9)
- Platforms: 1 island platform 1 side platform
- Tracks: 3
- Train operators: DB Regio Mitte; S-Bahn Rhein-Main; Vlexx

Construction
- Accessible: Yes

Other information
- Station code: 1849
- DS100 code: FFLU
- IBNR: 8070004
- Category: 3
- Fare zone: : 5090
- Website: www.bahnhof.de

History
- Opened: 14 March 1972

Services
Preceding station	DB Fernverkehr	Following station
Terminus	ICE 3 Sprinter	Frankfurt (Main) Hbf towards Berlin Südkreuz
Terminus	ICE 4 Sprinter	Frankfurt (Main) Hbf towards Hamburg-Altona
Preceding station	DB Regio Mitte	Following station
Rüsselsheim towards Koblenz Hbf	RE 2 Südwest-Express	Frankfurt-Niederrad towards Frankfurt (Main) Hbf
Preceding station	Hessische Landesbahn	Following station
Terminus	RE 59	Frankfurt Süd towards Bamberg
Preceding station	Vlexx	Following station
Rüsselsheim towards Saarbrücken Hbf	RE 3	Frankfurt-Niederrad towards Frankfurt (Main) Hbf
Preceding station	Rhine-Main S-Bahn	Following station
Kelsterbach towards Wiesbaden Hbf	S8 (Rhine-Main S-Bahn)	Gateway Gardens towards Hanau Hbf
Kelsterbach towards Wiesbaden Hbf	S9 (Rhine-Main S-Bahn)	Gateway Gardens towards Hanau Hbf
Location

Frankfurt (Main) Airport regional station (German: Frankfurt (Main) Flughafen Regionalbahnhof) is an underground railway station at Frankfurt Airport in Frankfurt, Germany. It provides local S-Bahn and Regionalbahn services to the city and the Frankfurt/Rhine-Main Metropolitan Region. The station opened on 14 March 1972 together with a new passenger terminal (Terminal Mitte, now called Terminal 1). At the time it was only the second railway station serving an airport in Germany, and the first in then-West Germany (after Berlin Schönefeld Airport Station, then in East Germany). Since December 2025, ICE line 3 and 4 use the station as their terminal station.

In 1999, a second train station opened at Frankfurt Airport (Frankfurt Airport long-distance station) which is primarily used by long-distance trains, mostly ICE services.

== Name ==
Rail connections

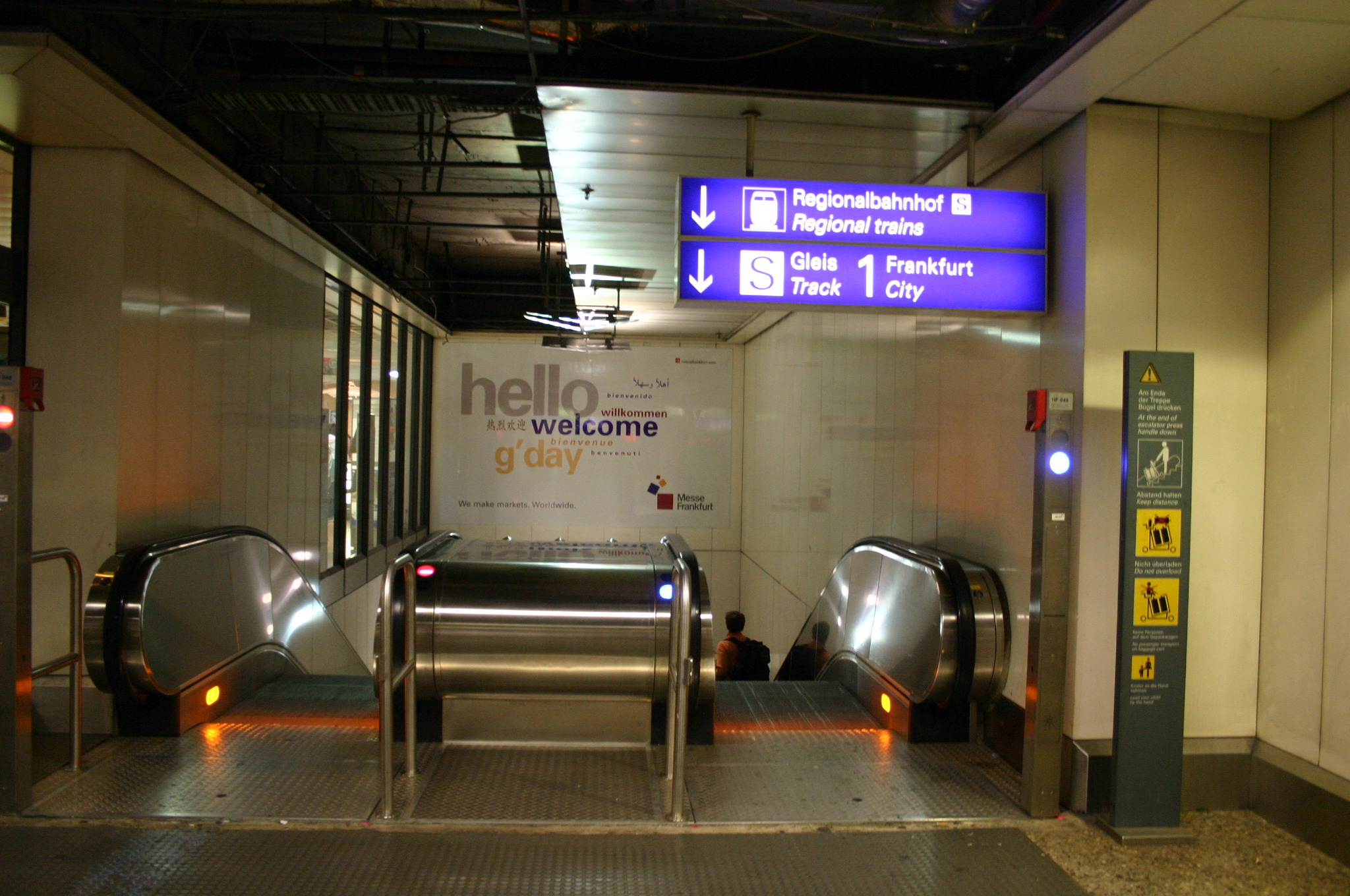
Escalators to railway platform

Prior to the commissioning of the airport's second train station this station was called just Frankfurt am Main Airport station (German: Bahnhof Frankfurt am Main Flughafen). Both regional and long-distance trains ran from this station until 1999.

== Station layout ==
The regional train station is located underneath Terminal 1, concourse B. It is designed as an underground through station and has three platform tracks (called "Regio 1" to "Regio 3"), of which tracks 2 and 3 are on either side of a central platform. The central platform is 410 m (1,350 ft) long and the outer platform is 210 m (690 ft) long. Vehicles with diesel traction may enter the regional station only when the level of their exhaust emissions are below set limits. Currently class 612 diesel multiple units operate every two hours through the regional station on each of the routes between Frankfurt and Saarbrücken (RE 2) and Frankfurt and Koblenz (RE 3).

== History ==
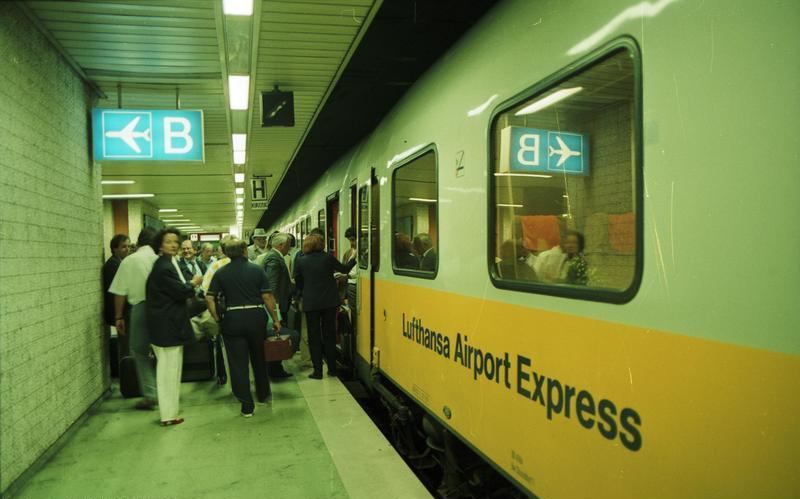
Class 403 (1973) EMU of the Lufthansa-Airport-Express in 1988

A three-track underground station was already envisaged when a new and larger passenger terminal was planned at Frankfurt Airport in the mid-1960s. In April 1969, Deutsche Bundesbahn (today called Deutsche Bahn) and the airport operator FAG (today called Fraport) signed a funding agreement on connecting the airport to the rail network. The costs for the station and the 7.5 km (4.7 mi) long airport loop line amounted to 100 million Deutsche Mark (approximately €51 million), with Deutsche Bundesbahn funding half and the other half split between FAG and the federal government. The station was opened on 14 March 1972. It served initially as a station for regional trains, but its 410 m (1,350 ft) long central platform was ready from the beginning to handle also long-distance trains.

Between 1982 and 1993 the station was used by the Lufthansa Airport Express, which ran to and from Düsseldorf and Stuttgart. As part of the enhancement of the Intercity (IC) network in 1985, the station was served hourly by IC services. With the opening of the long-distance station on 30 May 1999, most long-distance traffic operated via the new station. Occasional long-distance trains still stopped at the regional station, since the long-distance station was closed overnight. Since the annual timetable change in December 2010, the long-distance station is also open at night, so no more scheduled long-distance trains stop at the regional station.

In the late 1980s, it was planned, as part of the construction of the airport's eastern terminal (Terminal 2) and the Cologne–Frankfurt high-speed line, to build a fourth (long-distance) platform track and to upgrade the rail infrastructure, including building a tunnel to connect with the Mannheim–Frankfurt railway towards Zeppelinheim. Despite the high cost that would have been required for the reconstruction of the existing building, it was expected that capacity would not have been sufficient in the medium term. Another proposal considered was to build an additional station in the existing building. Although a feasibility study found that would have had positive returns, this option was rejected due to its high cost. Next to the platform provision had been made for the building of another track, which has never been built.

From 9–30 July 2007, the regional train station was closed for the complete replacement of the 30-year-old tracks. Since the beginning of 2010, the distribution level and the connecting corridor to Terminal 1 have had a new, brighter design following a fundamental modernisation.

From the end of 2017 to December 2020, the station was renovated again. Deutsche Bahn provided funding of almost €10m and the state of Hesse funded €4m. The grant notice was handed over at the station on 6 December 2017. The work was completed on platform 1 in October 2018 and on platform 2 in March 2019. The floor coverings and platform equipment were replaced, and the walls were also redesigned.

== Services ==
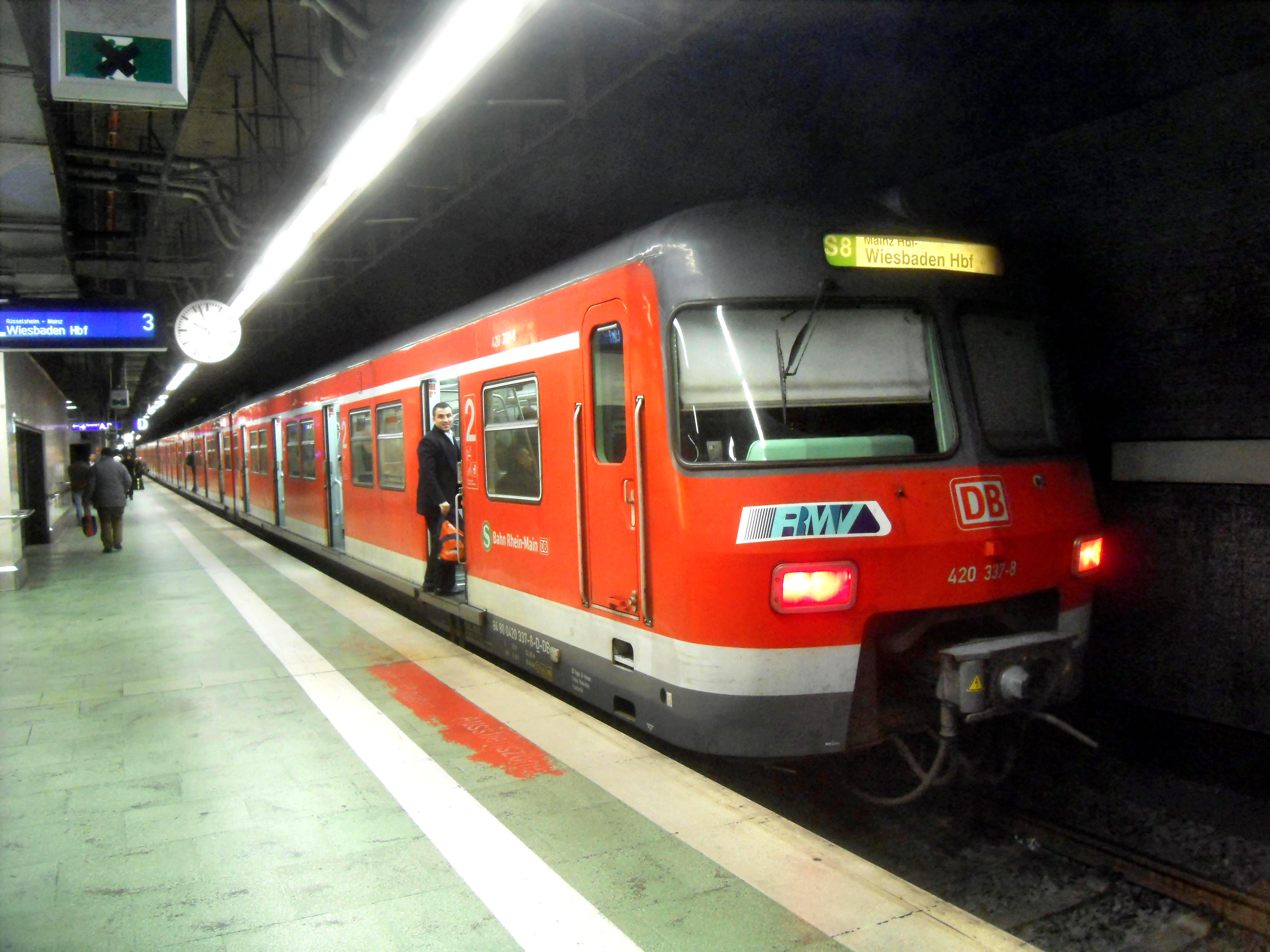
Class 420 EMU of the Rhine-Main S-Bahn on line S 8 in Frankfurt Airport Regional station on its way to Wiesbaden Hbf.

=== Long-distance services ===
The following two ICE services terminate at the Frankfurt Airport regional station.

Line	Route		Frequency
ICE 3	Frankfurt Airport – Frankfurt – Berlin-Spandau – Berlin – Berlin Südkreuz		Twice a day
ICE 4	Frankfurt Airport – Frankfurt – Hanover – Hamburg	– Hamburg Dammtor – Hamburg-Altona	Five trains
ICE 4	Frankfurt Airport – Frankfurt – Hanover – Hamburg	← Neumünster ← Schleswig ← Flensburg	One train

=== Regional services ===
The following Regional-Express and S-Bahn services stop in Frankfurt Airport regional station:

Line	Route	Frequency
S8 (Rhine-Main S-Bahn)	Wiesbaden Hbf – Mainz Hbf – Frankfurt Airport – Frankfurt (Main) Hbf (tief) – Offenbach Ost (– Hanau Hbf)	30 min
S9 (Rhine-Main S-Bahn)	Wiesbaden Hbf – Mainz-Kastel – Frankfurt Airport – Frankfurt (Main) Hbf (tief) – Offenbach Ost – Hanau Hbf	30 min
RE 2	Koblenz Hbf – Boppard Hbf – Bingen (Rh) Hbf – Mainz Hbf – Frankfurt Airport – Frankfurt (Main) Hbf (Mittelrhein-Main-Express)	120 mins (60 mins in combination)
RE 3	Saarbrücken Hbf – Bad Kreuznach – Mainz Hbf – Frankfurt Airport – Frankfurt (Main) Hbf (Rhein-Nahe-Express)	120 mins (60 mins in combination)
RE 59	Frankfurt Airport – Frankfurt South – Hanau Hbf (– Kahl – Aschaffenburg Hbf – Gemünden (Main) – Würzburg Hbf) (only in peak hours)	Individual services
RB 31	Frankfurt Hbf – Frankfurt Airport – Rüsselsheim – Mainz Hbf – Alzey – (Alzey West – Kirchheimbolanden)	Some trains in the peak (peak direction only)
