= Dörnigheim =

District of Maintal, Germany

- Stadtteil of Maintal
- Flag Coat of arms
- Interactive map of Dörnigheim
- Location within Germany Location within Hesse
- Coordinates: 50°09′N 08°50′E
- Country: Germany
- State: Hesse
- Admin. region: Darmstadt
- District: Main-Kinzig-Kreis
- Town: Maintal

Area
  - Total: 9.85 km^{2} (3.80 sq mi)
- Elevation: 102 m (335 ft)

Population (2023-12-31)
  - Total: 17,105
  - Density: 1,740/km^{2} (4,500/sq mi)
- Time zone: UTC+01:00 (CET)
  - Summer (DST): UTC+02:00 (CEST)
- Postal codes: 63477
- Dialling codes: 06181
- Vehicle registration: ERB

Dörnigheim (German pronunciation: [ˈdœʁnɪçˌhaɪm]) is the biggest district of the town of Maintal in Hesse, Germany. It is situated on the right, or northern, bank of the Main river. As of 2023, it has a population of 17,105.

== History ==
Dörnigheim's existence was first documented in the year 793. According to a document Wolfbodo donated the settlement area of Maingau including "Turinchheim" (old name of the city) to the Abbot of Lorsch. The proprietorship was shared between the counts of Hanau and the bishops of Mainz.

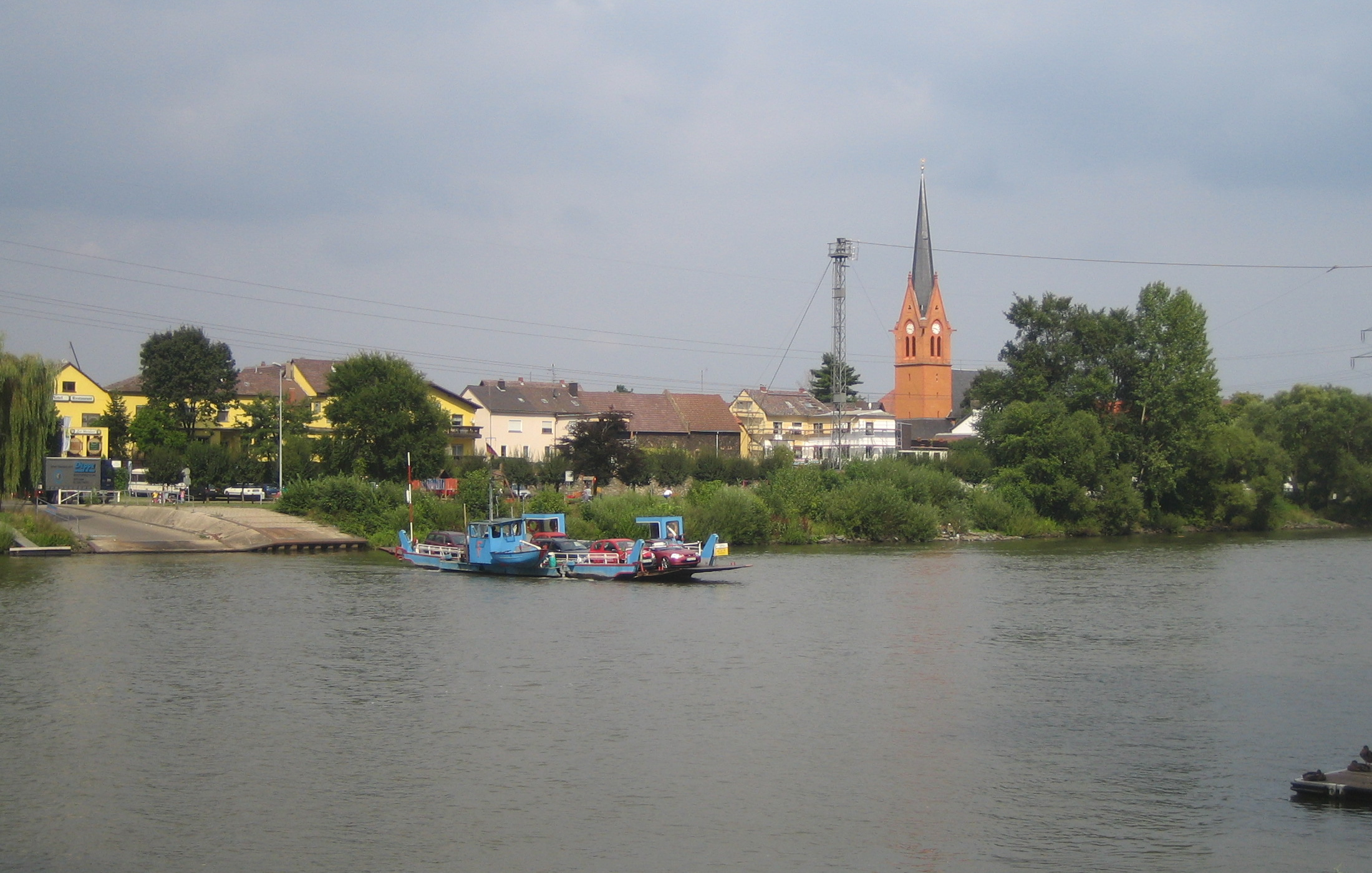
Ferry at Dörnigheim

Because of its well situated location between Hanau in the east and Frankfurt am Main in the west Dörnigheim was favoured as a last stop for travelling salesman on their way to Frankfurt. The Maintal-Dörnigheim Ferry, a cable ferry across the Main, links Dörnigheim with Mühlheim am Main on the opposite bank.

In 1964 Dörnigheim received city rights because it grew and became more than 10000 inhabitants. In 1974 the city lost its independence and became together with three other towns, Bischofsheim, Hochstadt and Wachenbuchen, a district of the newly formed city of Maintal.
