= Maintal =

- Town
- Coat of arms

- Location of Maintal within Main-Kinzig-Kreis district
- Interactive map of Maintal
- Location within Germany Location within Hesse
- Coordinates: 50°09′N 08°50′E
- Country: Germany
- State: Hesse
- Admin. region: Darmstadt
- District: Main-Kinzig-Kreis

Government
  - Mayor (2021–27): Monika Böttcher

Area
  - Total: 32.41 km^{2} (12.51 sq mi)
- Elevation: 100 m (330 ft)

Population (2025-12-31)
  - Total: 39,130
  - Density: 1,207/km^{2} (3,127/sq mi)
- Time zone: UTC+01:00 (CET)
  - Summer (DST): UTC+02:00 (CEST)
- Postal codes: 63477
- Dialling codes: 06181, 06109 (Bischofsheim)
- Vehicle registration: MKK
- Website: www.maintal.de

Maintal (German pronunciation: [ˈmaɪntaːl], lit. 'Main Valley') is the second largest town of the Main-Kinzig district, in Hesse, Germany. It is situated on the river Main, between Frankfurt am Main and Hanau.

== Geography ==
=== Neighbouring places ===
The neighbouring countries of Maintal are Niederdorfelden and Schöneck in the north, the city of Hanau in the East, Mühlheim am Main and Offenbach am Main on the other bank of the river Main as well as Frankfurt am Main in the west.

=== Division of the town ===
Maintal consists of the four districts Dörnigheim, Bischofsheim, Hochstadt (seat of city-administration) and Wachenbuchen.

== History ==
The city was artificially created in 1974 in the course of the Hessian administration reform by merging the city of Dörnigheim (now Maintal's biggest district) with the nearby towns of Bischofsheim, Hochstadt and Wachenbuchen.

== Economy ==
- Syngenta Agro GmbH
- Altec Lansing
- Rasmussen GmbH

== Transport ==
Maintal is connected with Hanau and Frankfurt by the so-called nordmainische Eisenbahn (northern Main railway) and has two stations (Maintal-West in Bischofsheim near the Main river and Maintal-East in Dörnigheim)

Two ferries cross the Main to the left, or south, bank. The Rumpenheim Ferry links Bischofsheim with Rumpenheim, whilst the Maintal-Dörnigheim Ferry links Dörnigheim with Mühlheim am Main.

== Twin towns – sister cities ==
Maintal is twinned with:

- Luisant, France (1973)
- Moosburg, Austria (1976)
- Esztergom, Hungary (1993)
- Katerini, Greece (1995)
