= Mühlheim am Main =

- Town
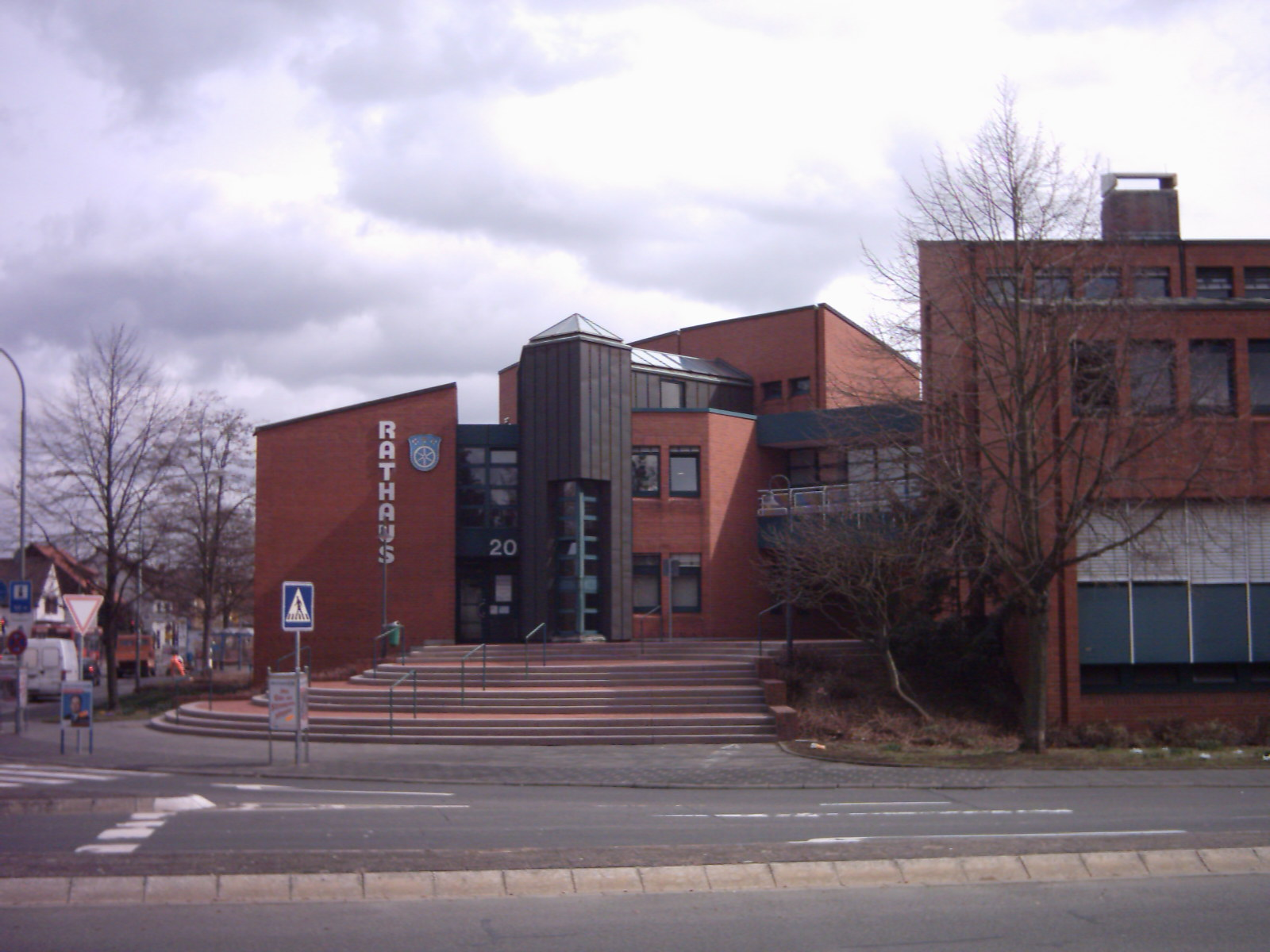
- Town hall

- Coat of arms

- Location of Mühlheim am Main within Offenbach district
- Interactive map of Mühlheim am Main
- Location within Germany Location within Hesse
- Coordinates: 50°7′N 8°55′E
- Country: Germany
- State: Hesse
- Admin. region: Darmstadt
- District: Offenbach
- Subdivisions: 3 Stadtteile

Government
  - Mayor: Dr. Alexander Krey (CDU)

Area
  - Total: 20.67 km^{2} (7.98 sq mi)
- Elevation: 103 m (338 ft)

Population (2025-12-31)
  - Total: 29,213
  - Density: 1,413/km^{2} (3,660/sq mi)
- Time zone: UTC+01:00 (CET)
  - Summer (DST): UTC+02:00 (CEST)
- Postal codes: 63165
- Dialling codes: 06108
- Vehicle registration: OF
- Website: www.muehlheim.de

Mühlheim am Main (German pronunciation: [ˈmyːlhaɪm ʔam ˈmaɪn], lit. 'Mühlheim on the Main') is a town of roughly 28,500 inhabitants on the Main’s left bank in the Offenbach district in the Regierungsbezirk of Darmstadt in Hesse, Germany. Its municipal area measures 20.67 km^{2} (including outlying centres’ areas).

== Geography ==
=== Location ===
Mühlheim is one of 13 towns and communities in the Offenbach district. It lies in the Frankfurt Rhine Main Region south of the Main between Offenbach am Main and Hanau in the historic Maingau region. The Bieber empties into the Rodau within town limits, and the Rodau then empties into the Main.

=== Population development ===
(each time at 31 December)

- 1998 - 26,124
- 1999 - 26,210
- 2000 - 26,082
- 2001 - 26,210
- 2002 - 26,396
- 2003 - 26,436
- 2004 - 26,557
- 2005 - 26,582
- 2006 - 26,625
- 2007 - 28,279

=== Neighbouring communities ===
Mühlheim borders in the north, along the Main, on the town of Maintal, in the east on the town of Hanau (both in Main-Kinzig-Kreis), in the south on the town of Obertshausen (Offenbach district) and in the west on the district-free city of Offenbach.

=== Constituent communities ===
Mühlheim's Stadtteile are Mühlheim, Dietesheim and Lämmerspiel. The main centre itself also has an Old Town and an inner town, as well as residential neighbourhoods named Markwald and Rote Warte.

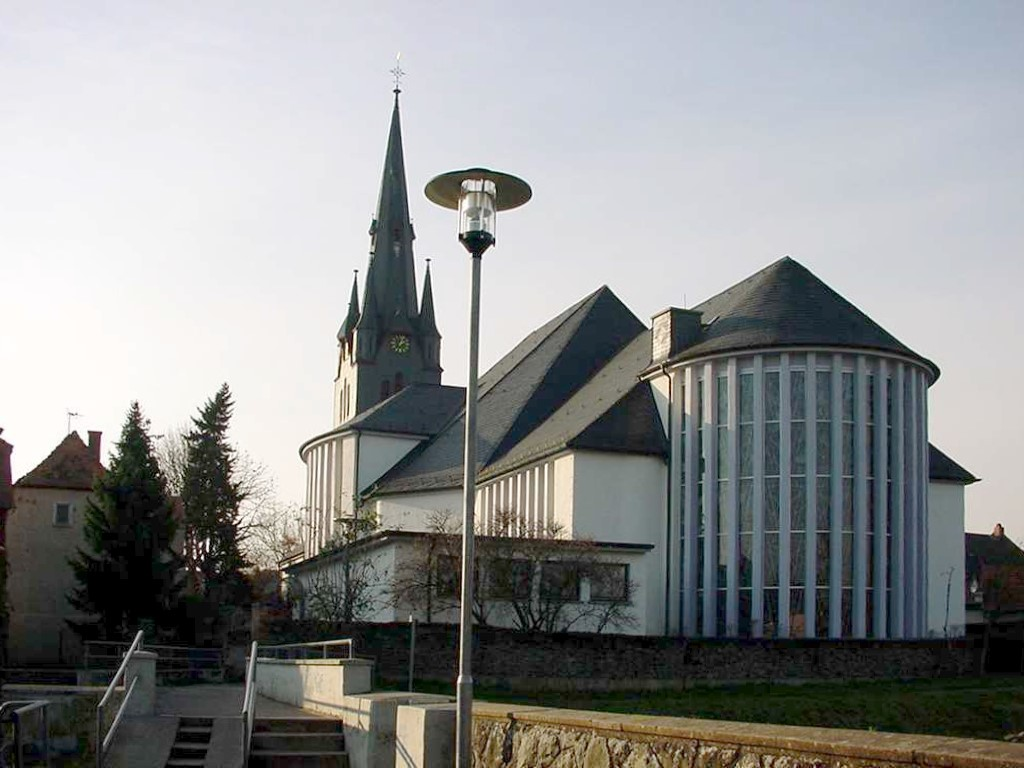
St. Markus in Mühlheim

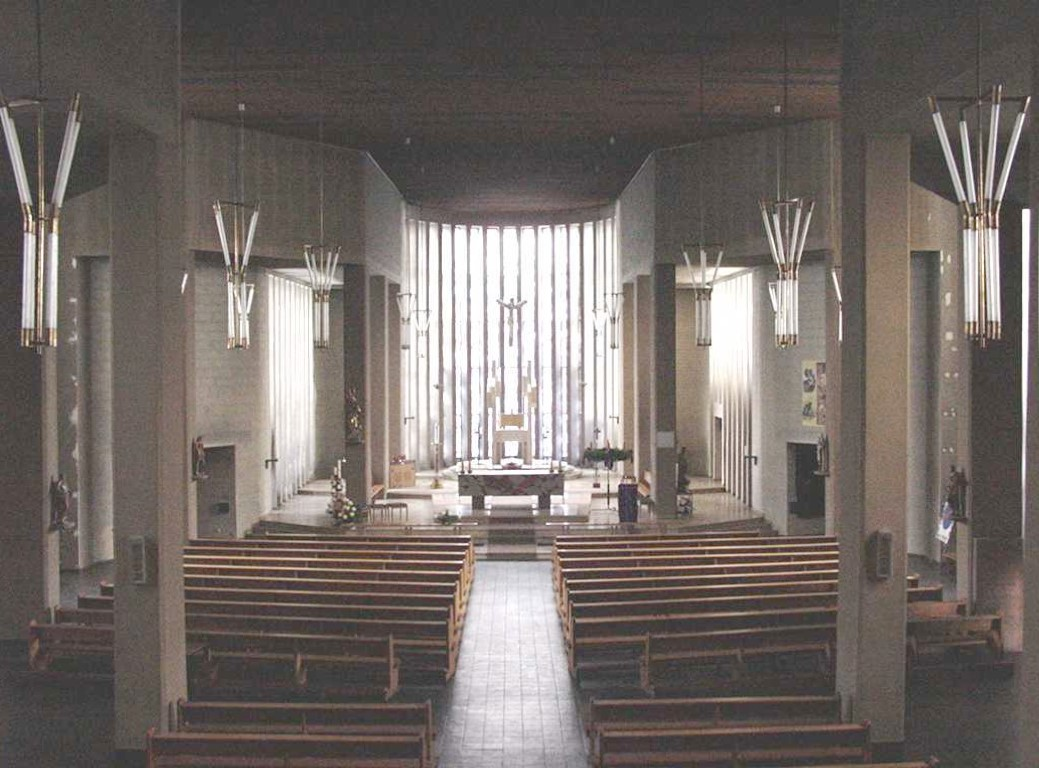
St. Markus in Mühlheim, within

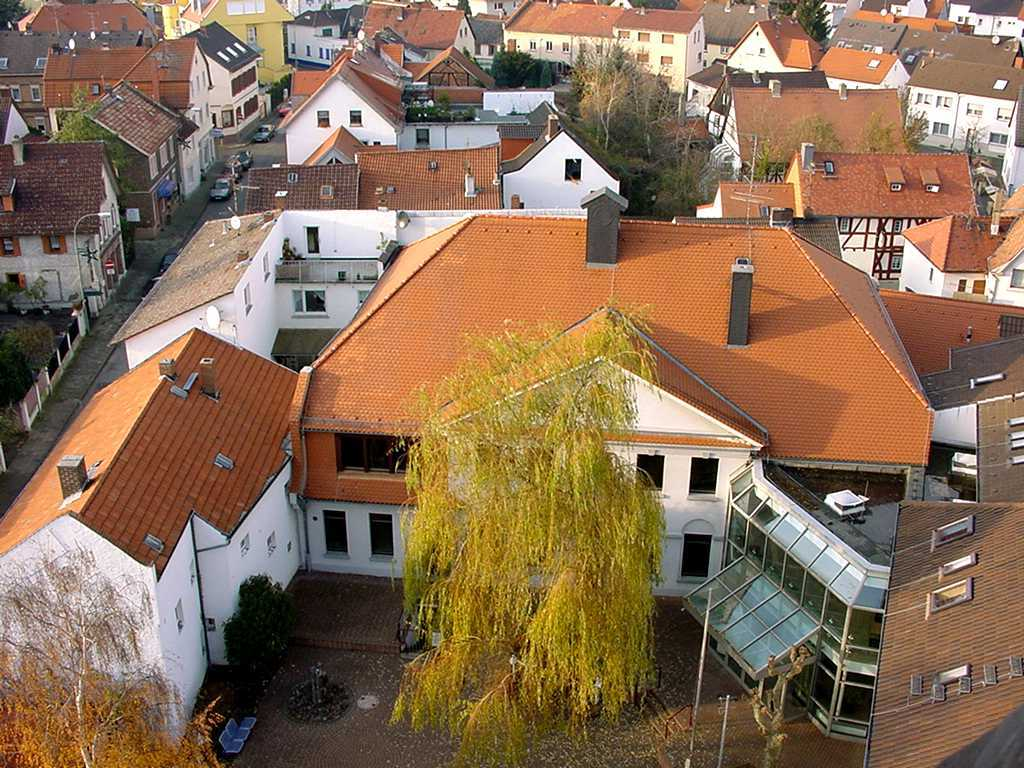
St. Markus parochial centre

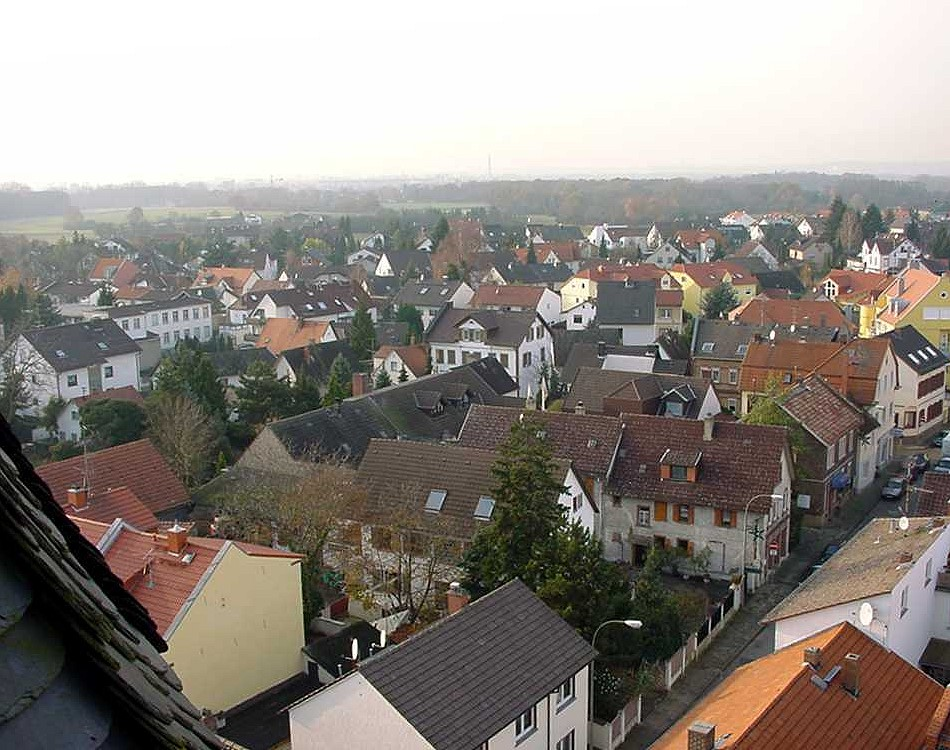
View of St. Markus, towards the Main in the northwest

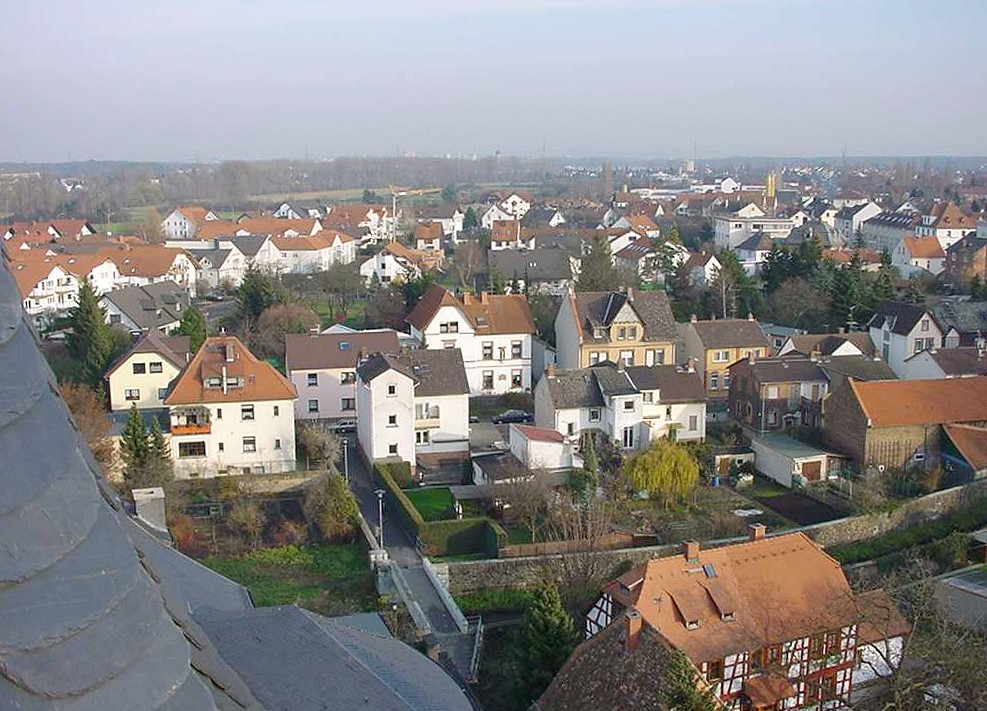
View of St. Markus, towards the east

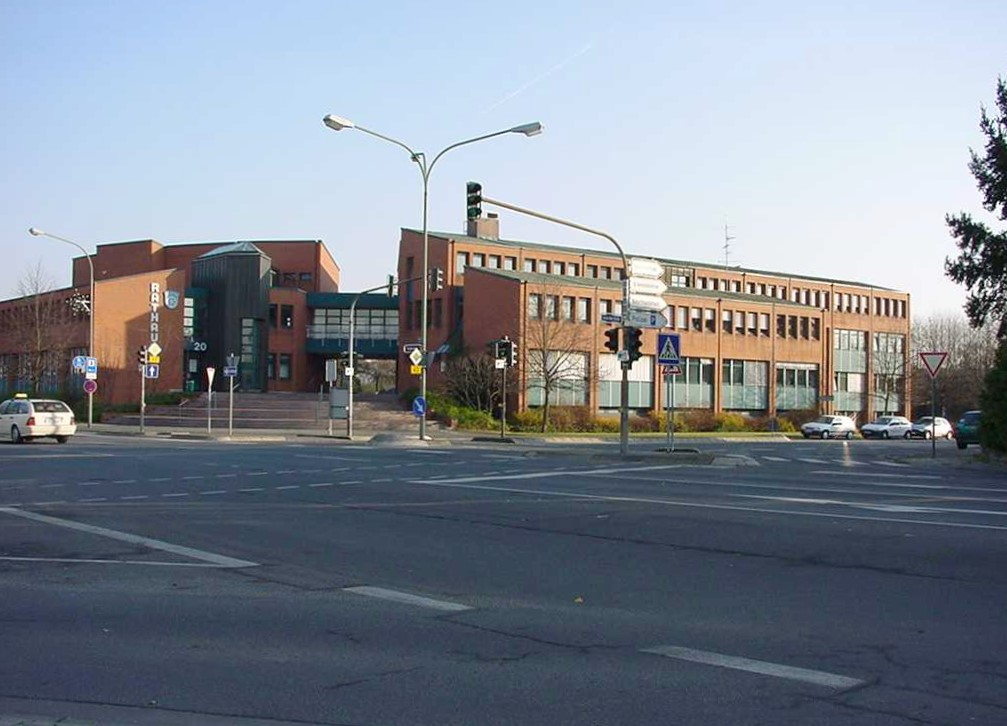
Mühlheim Town Hall

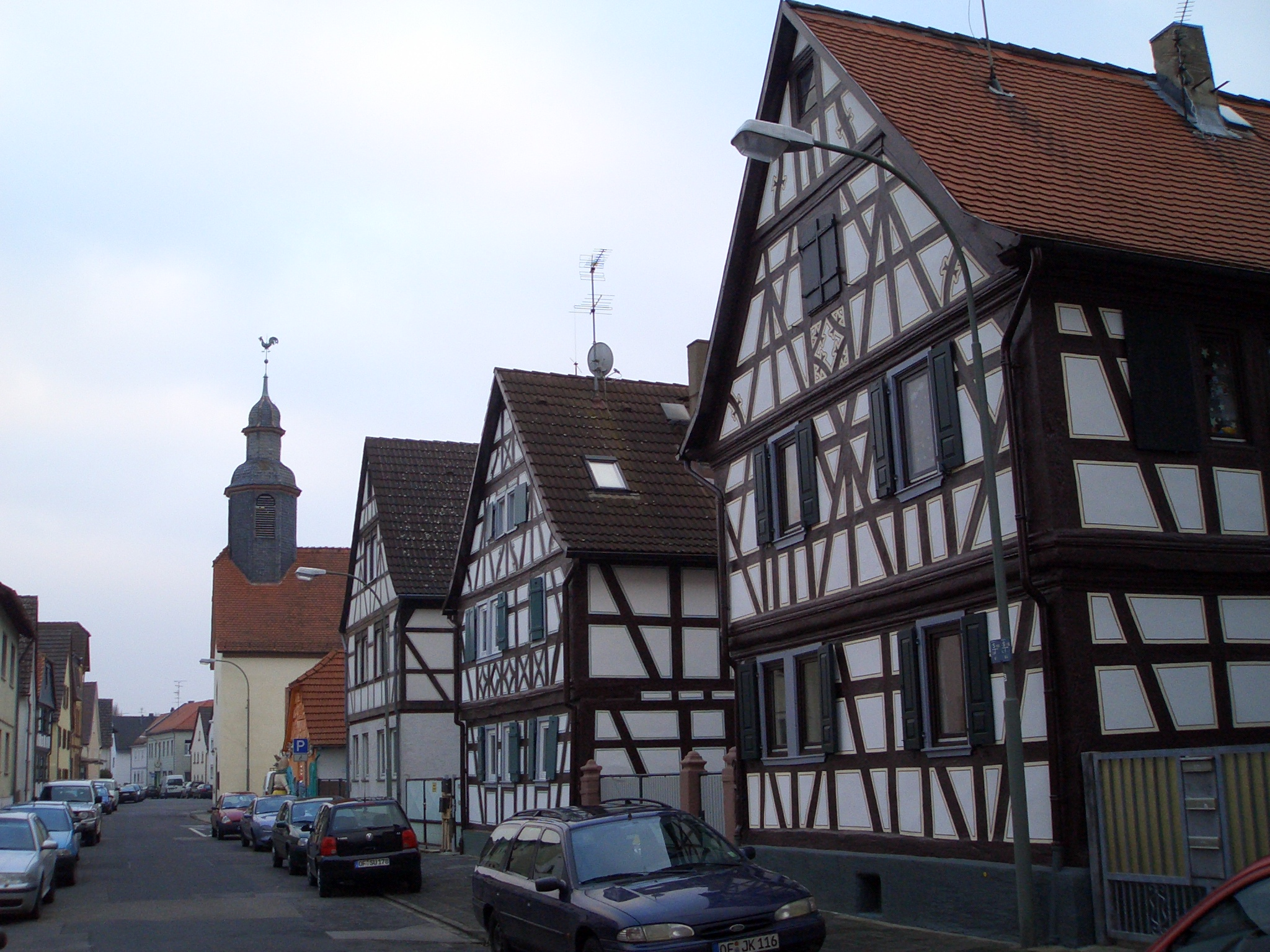
Dietesheim community core

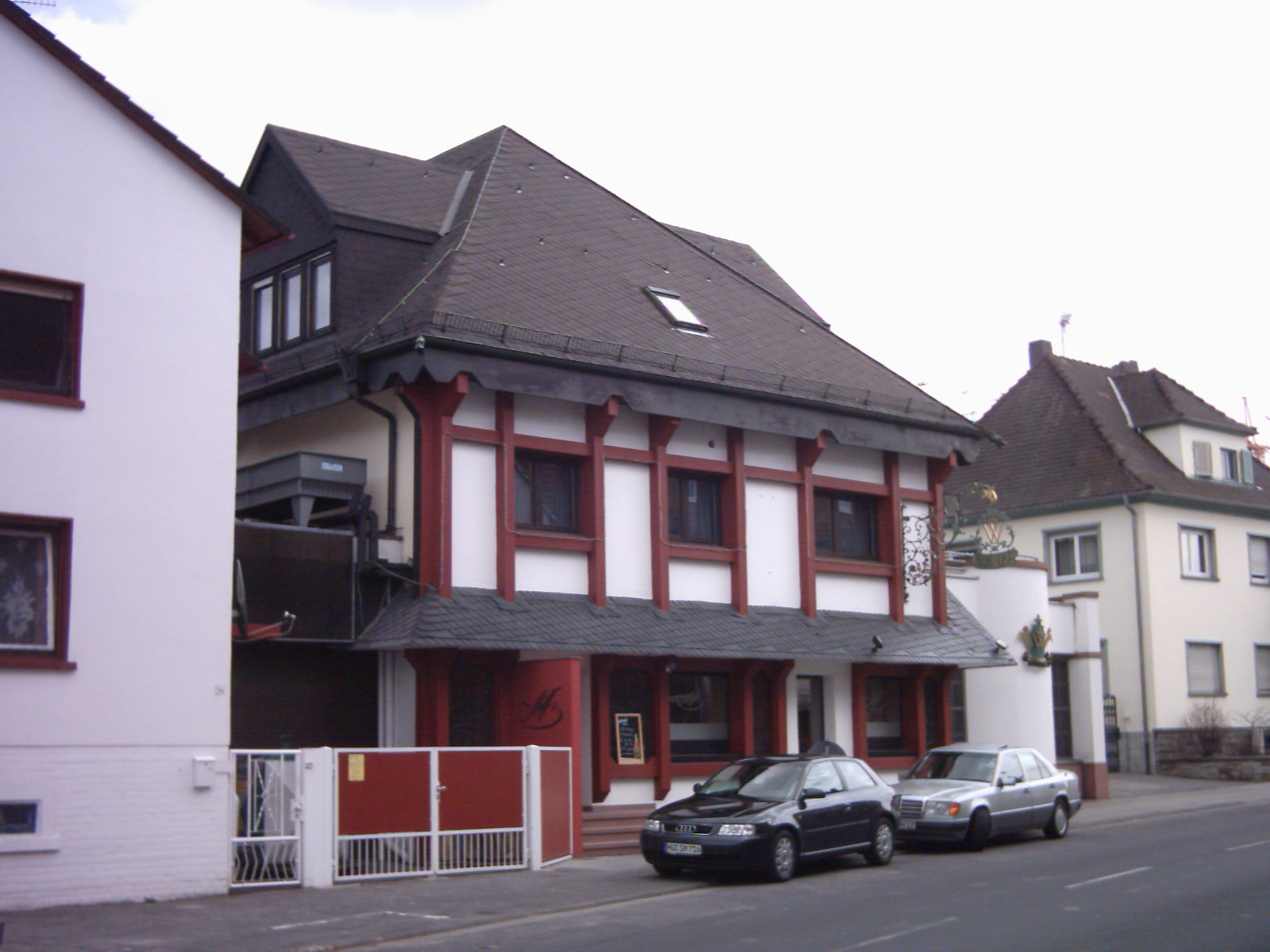
Landhaus Hotel Waitz in Lämmerspiel

== History ==
Emperor Louis the Pious donated in 815 Untermühlheim together with Obermühlheim (today called Seligenstadt), which were then in the Frankish Maingau to Einhard. The name Mühlheim goes back to the ten mills (Mühlen in German) which in earlier times stood on the banks of the brooks Rodau and Bieber. Today, though, only one mill has been preserved, the Brückenmühle. This can be visited each year on Whit Monday (German Mill Day).

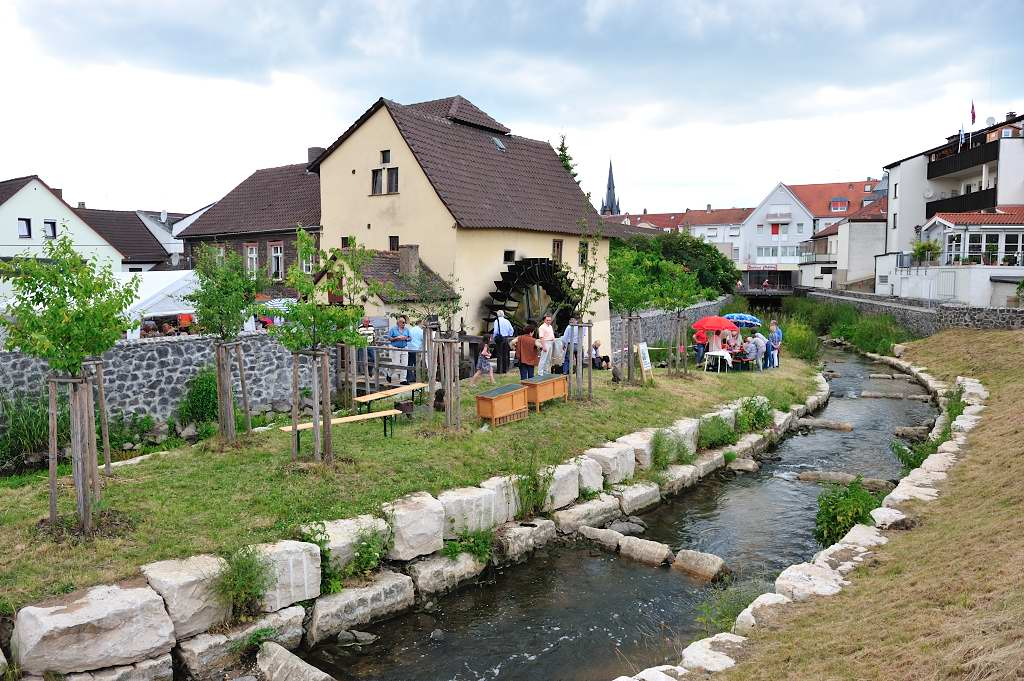
Brückenmühle

For a long time in the Middle Ages Mühlheim was Mother Church to the surrounding places of Bürgel, Offenbach, Bieber, Heusenstamm, Dietesheim and Lämmerspiel. The spiritual court for the affiliated communities belonging to the Mother Church sat in this time in Mühlheim. From the 14th century, the Lords of Hagenhausen-Eppstein exercised lordly rights (Hoheitsrechte) in Mühlheim. From the Middle Ages until 1819, Mühlheim and the once self-administering communities of Dietesheim and Lämmerspiel belonged to the Biebermark (a communally owned cadastral area), and the outlying woodlands belonged to the Wildbann Dreieich, a royal hunting forest. Within current town limits once lay a place called Meielsheim.

In 1435, Mühlheim, as was so with many places in the area, was sold along with the Amt of Steinheim by the Lords of Eppstein to the Electorate of Mainz. After the Archbishopric of Mainz was secularized, Mühlheim became Hessian. In 1819, after the Biebermark was partitioned, Mühlheim got what is today called the Markwald (forest). In 1873, the Frankfurt-Hanau railway by way of Mühlheim was brought into service. Ever since 1939, when in the framework of National Socialist administrative reform the rural community of Mühlheim and the village of Dietesheim were forcibly merged to become the town of Mühlheim am Main, Mühlheim has had town rights. In 1977, in the framework of municipal reform, Lämmerspiel was amalgamated with the town.

== Politics ==
=== Town council ===
The municipal election held on 27 March 2011 yielded the following results:

Parties and voter communities		% 2011	Seats; 2011	% 2006	Seats; 2006	% 2001	Seats; 2001
CDU	Christian Democratic Union of Germany	30.7	14	37.4	17	40.4	18
SPD	Social Democratic Party of Germany	41.3	19	40.2	18	39.4	18
GREENS	Bündnis 90/Die Grünen	13.7	6	8.0	3	9.0	4
FDP	Free Democratic Party	2.4	1	3.6	2	2.5	1
BÜRGER	BÜRGER FÜR MÜHLHEIM e. V.	12.0	5	10.7	5	8.0	4
FWG	Freie Wählergemeinschaft Mühlheim a. Main e.V.	–	–	–	–	0.6	0
Total		100.0	45	100.0	45	100.0	45
Voter turnout in %		44.0		46.6		50.3	

=== Coat of arms ===
The town's arms might be described thus: Azure a six-spoked waterwheel argent with twelve buckets, in chief three Immertreu of the second with centres Or.

== Culture and sightseeing ==
=== Theatre ===
The travesti theatre Gerda’s kleine Weltbühne (Gerda's Little World Stage”) has for more than 30 years been important in Mühlheim's cultural life, and it is known beyond Mühlheim. Its shows are booked months ahead of time.

In the “SCHANZ” cultural hall, the converted former apprentice's workshop of the firm Stahl-Schanz, the Kulturfabrik EigenArt e.V. (a club) has been staging theatrical, cabaret and musical events weekly since 1998.

=== Museums ===
Mühlheim has its own town museum. Moreover, there are also private collections, among them Mühlheim entrepreneur Hans-Günter Zach's Rolls-Royce Museum, visits to which are on request, upon payment of a donation for social purposes.

=== Buildings ===
Mühlheim's watertower, an historic basalt structure near the Mühlheim railway station, is a widely visible landmark of the town, and is still in use.

=== Natural monuments ===
The conservation area Dietesheimer Steinbrüche (“Dietesheim Quarries”) represents a natural backdrop that is unique in the Frankfurt Rhine Main Region. It is the former basalt quarries in the outlying centre of Dietesheim, which, after basalt mining was given up, was renaturalized and opened to the public. Particularly impressive are the basalt cliffs at the Vogelsberger See (lake).

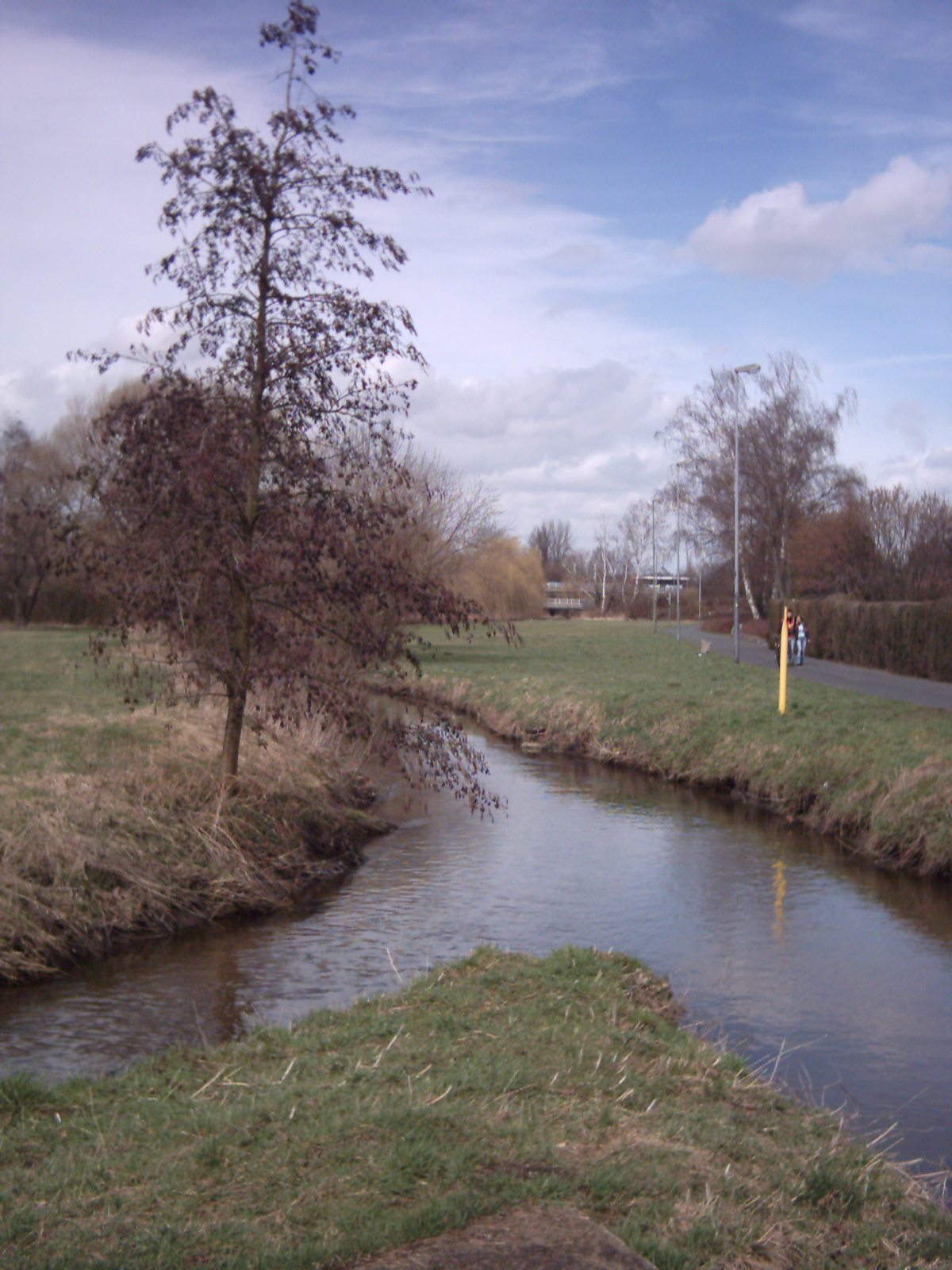
Mouth of the Bieber into the Rodau

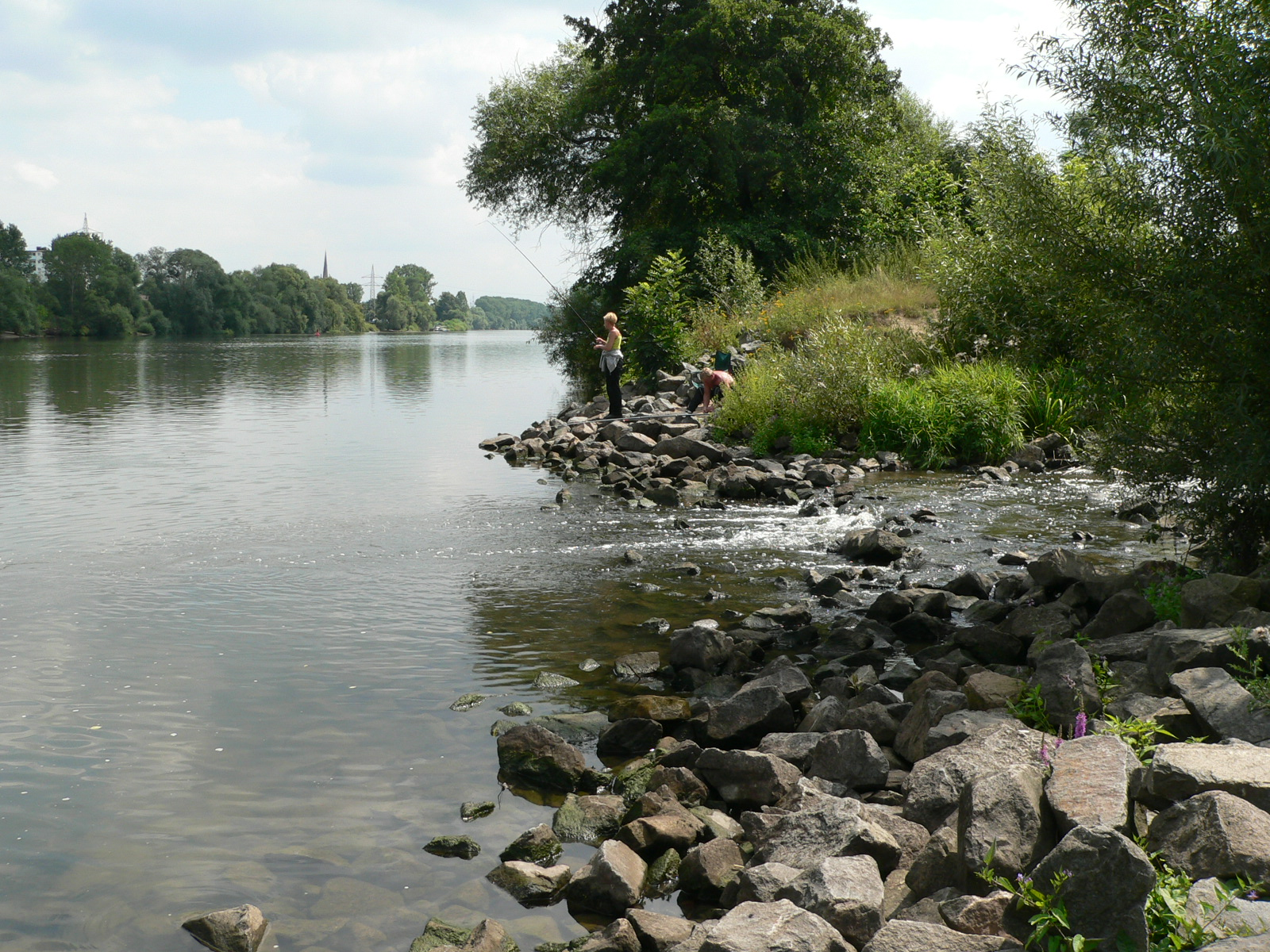
Mouth of the Rodau into the Main near Mühlheim

=== Sport ===
Besides various sport fields for ball sports, there are both an indoor and an outdoor swimming pool in the outlying centre of Lämmerspiel. On the Main, there are rowing sports. Furthermore, it is possible to engage in shooting sports at the Schützengemeinschaft Mühlheim-Dietesheim under Deutscher Schützenbund rules, as well as, in some departments, under Bund Deutscher Sportschützen or Deutschen Schießsport Union rules. Further clubs in Dietesheim, Mühlheim and Lämmerspiel have tennis, table tennis and Kickers-Viktoria Mühlheim 1910 (football).

=== Regular events ===
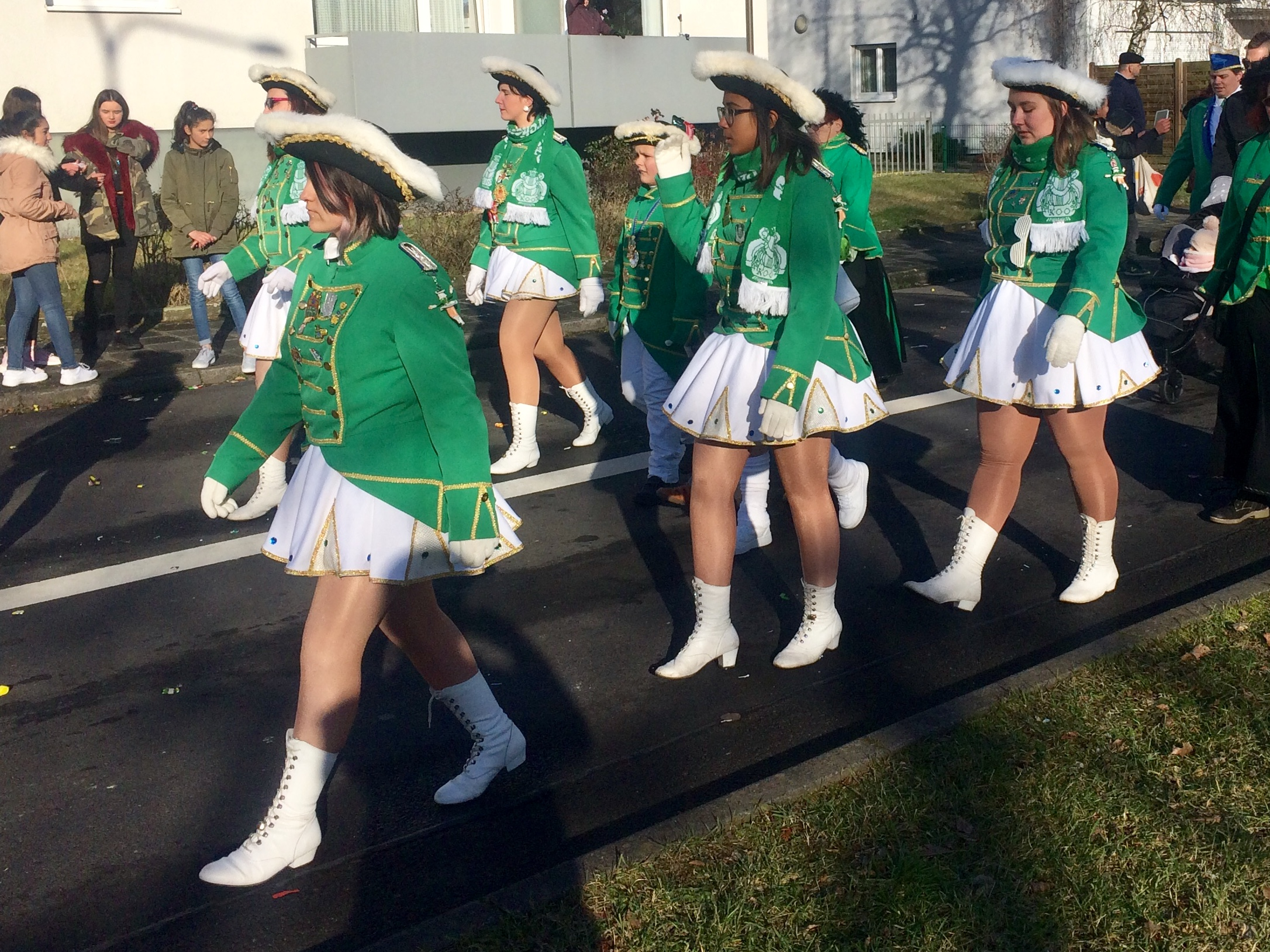
Carnival parade on Shrove Monday 2018

The Fasching (Shrovetide) parades through the centres of Dietesheim and Mühlheim on Shrove Monday (Rosenmontag) and the one through Lämmerspiel on Shrove Tuesday draw a great number of visitors each year from the whole region.

In late July, the cultural club Artificial Family e. V. stages a popular music festival in the former quarries, the Steinbruchfestival (“Quarry Festival”). Also widely popular and well attended in the region is the kermis (Kerb) in the outlying centre of Dietesheim, held each year on the weekend after 15 August. In the main centre of Mühlheim, the Old Town Festival (Altstadtfest) and the Christmas Market (Weihnachtsmarkt) are very popular, too.

Every June the Schützengemeinschaft Mühlheim-Dietesheim (sport shooting club) stages its company and club cup tournament. Eligible to enter are all Mühlheim clubs (about 150) and businesses.

== Religion ==
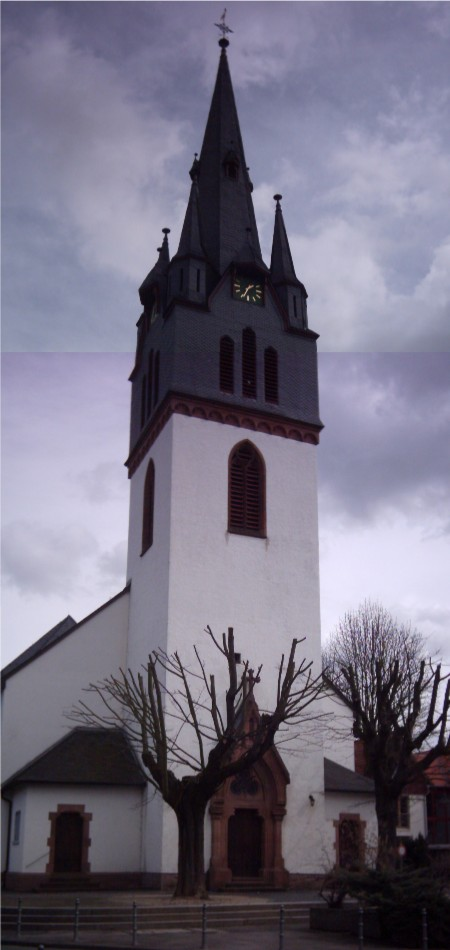
Catholic parish church St. Markus

=== Roman Catholicism ===
As an Electoral Mainz holding, Mühlheim was long a purely Catholic place. The two parishes of St. Maximilian Kolbe and St. Markus as well as the ones in the outlying centres belong as parts of the Deanery of Rodgau to the Diocese of Mainz.

=== Evangelical Church ===
The Evangelical parishes of Friedensgemeinde (“Peace Parish”) and Dietrich-Bonhoeffer-Gemeinde are part of the Evangelical Church in Hesse and Nassau.

=== Free churches ===
The Seventh-day Adventist Church and the Evangelical Methodist Church have congregations in town.

=== Others ===
The Jehovah's Witnesses have a Kingdom Hall in Mühlheim.

== Economy and infrastructure ==
Until the late 1970s, Mühlheim was an important industrial centre in the Offenbach district. In particular, basalt production at the quarries in Dietesheim, the chemical industry (Leonhardt dyeworks as well as rubber processing), gravel quarrying, leatherworking metal industries and the electrical industry were important factors in the economy. Since the end of the 1970s, a broad array of midsized businesses has settled in Mühlheim. Great industrial works are today seldom seen in Mühlheim.

=== Transport ===
Like many places in the Offenbach district, Mühlheim is also affected by a high traffic load and its attendant noise pollution. Owing to its location between Offenbach and Hanau, there is quite a high load on Bundesstraße 43. Running parallel to this for the most part is the busy Frankfurt-Fulda railway line, and Mühlheim also lies right on the approach to Frankfurt Airport.

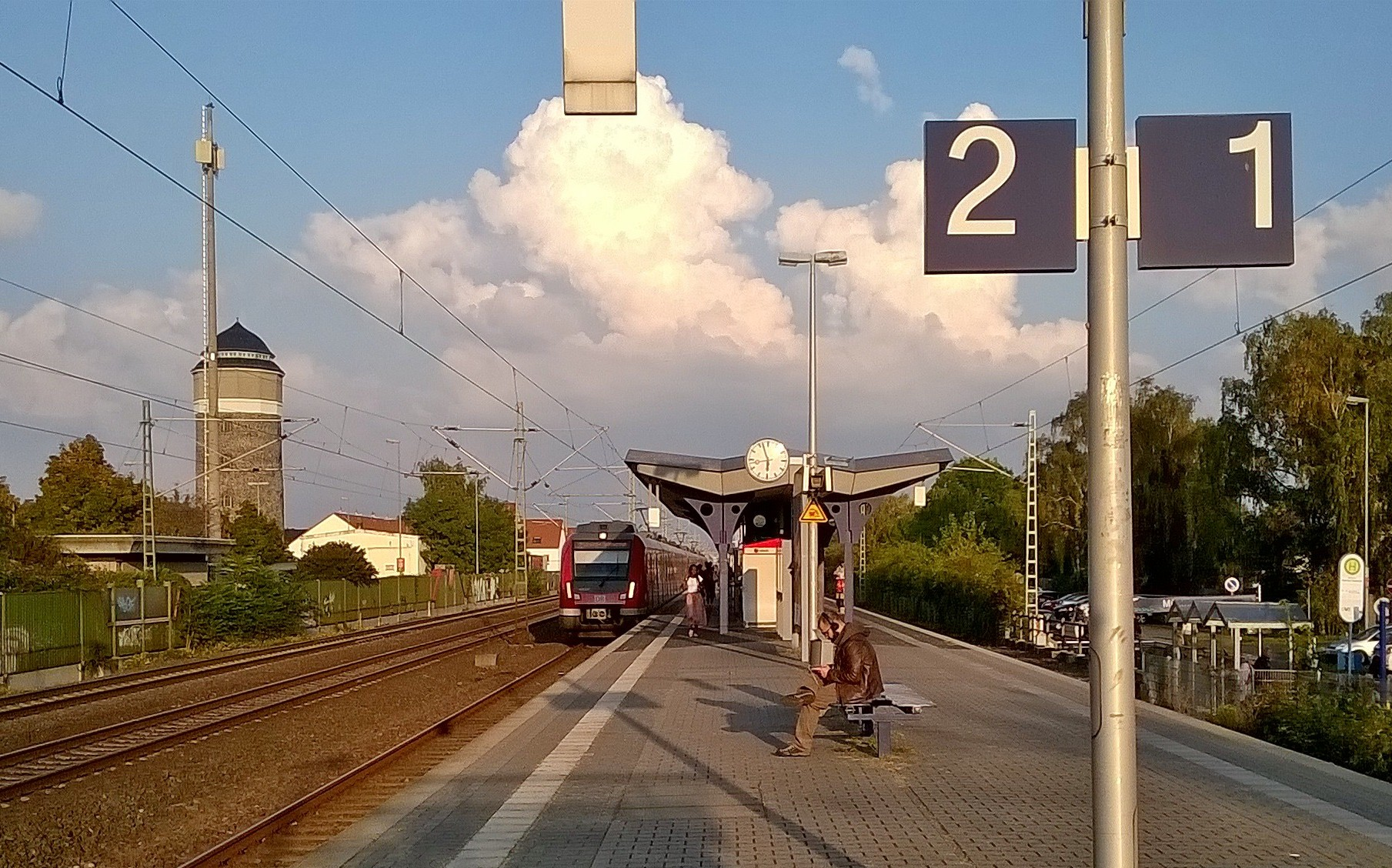
Mühlheim station

Since 1995, Mühlheim has had at its disposal two S-Bahn stations: one in Mühlheim, which replaced the old Mühlheim station, and the other, newly built one in the outlying centre of Dietesheim. Both stations are served by Rhine-Main S-Bahn lines S8 and S9, putting downtown Offenbach only 5 minutes away, downtown Frankfurt 20 minutes away and Frankfurt Airport 35 minutes away. With the beginning of S-Bahn service, the town bus network was also brought into service, which, most importantly, linked the outlying centre of Lämmerspiel to the local public transport network.

Moreover, the Offenbach buslines 103, 107 and 120 come to and pass through Mühlheim.

The Maintal-Dörnigheim Ferry, a cable ferry across the Main, linked Mühlheim with the Dörnigheim district of the town of Maintal on the opposite bank but officially discontinued on June 24, 2020.

=== Media ===
Among the local media is the daily newspaper Offenbach-Post. Complementing this is the monthly Die lokale Zeitung für Mühlheim, Dietesheim und Lämmerspiel (Zeitung means “newspaper”) with reports about people and events. There are, moreover, several advertising fliers. Reporting at greater length about Mühlheim are the weekly papers Dreieich-Zeitung and Stadtpost Mühlheim. Less often, reports about Mühlheim may be found in the local sections of the Frankfurter Rundschau. There is more often Mühlheim news in the Rhein-Main-Zeitung, a supplement to the Frankfurter Allgemeine Zeitung.

=== Education ===
Mühlheim has the following public schools:

- Friedrich-Ebert-Gymnasium (Mühlheim)
- Friedrich-Ebert-Schule (Hauptschule and Realschule, Mühlheim)
- Goetheschule (primary school with special education class, Mühlheim)
- Johann-Heinrich-Wichern-Schule (school for children with learning difficulties, Dietesheim)
- Markwaldschule (primary school, Markwald neighbourhood)
- Rote-Warte-Schule (primary school, Rote Warte neighbourhood)
- Brüder-Grimm-Schule (primary school, Lämmerspiel)
- Geschwister-Scholl-Schule (primary school, Dietesheim)
- Montessori-Schule Mühlheim (primary school, Nähe Markwald)

In Mühlheim, the first – and thus far only – Montessori primary school in the Offenbach district has been open since 2006. At this school, which is sponsored privately, more than 40 pupils from the first to fourth school years are currently (August 2008) taught in mixed-age classes.

Also, a department of the Verwaltungsfachhochschule Wiesbaden (“Wiesbaden Administration Technical College”), the Wiesbaden Police College, and the Police dog school in Mühlheim am Main are all resident.

Finally, Mühlheim is also home to a folk high school and a music school.

== Twin towns – sister cities ==
Mühlheim am Main is twinned with:

- Saint-Priest, France (1964)

== Notable people ==
The composer Paul Hindemith attended a music school in Mühlheim during five years of his childhood. Here he learnt to play the violin from notes. Also, Napoleon supposedly once stayed here overnight in Mühlheim during a campaign.

=== Honorary citizens ===
Among honorary citizens are Bruno Polga, former mayor of the French partner town of St.-Priest, retired district chief (Landrat) Walter Schmitt (SPD), retired first councillor Horst Lehr (SPD), Reinhold Latzke (SPD) and Irmgard Sondergeld (CDU).

== Mühlentaler and other awards ==
The Mühlentaler is an award given out by the town of Mühlheim to selected citizens who have served particularly well in shaping the town, for instance, through its clubs.

Moreover, there are the following awards and honours for those who have shown themselves worthy: the Ehrenurkunde (“Certificate of Honour”), the Ehrenbrief der Stadt Mühlheim (“Letter of Honour of the Town of Mühlheim”), the Ehrenplakette in Bronze (“Badge of Honour in Bronze”) and the Ehrenplakette in Silber (“Badge of Honour in Silver”). It is the Magistrat (roughly, town executive) that decides whom to honour, except for the Ehrenplakette in Silber and the status of honorary citizen. The choice of recipients of these honours is determined by the full town council.
