= Luisant =

- Commune
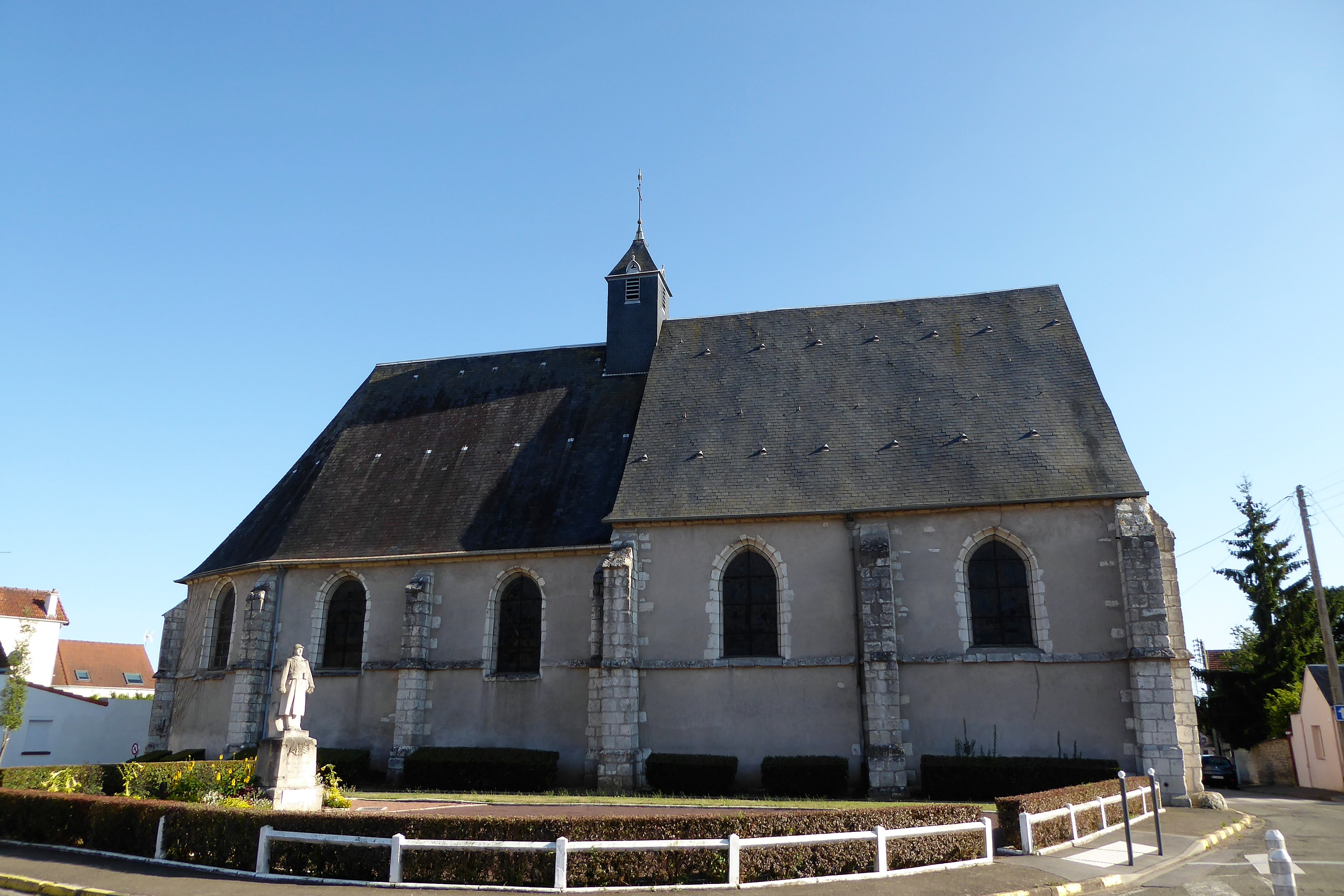
- The church in Luisant

- Coat of arms
- Location of Luisant
- Location within France Location within Centre-Val de Loire
- Coordinates: 48°25′57″N 1°28′38″E
- Country: France
- Region: Centre-Val de Loire
- Department: Eure-et-Loir
- Arrondissement: Chartres
- Canton: Lucé
- Intercommunality: CA Chartres Métropole

Government
  - Mayor (2020–2026): Bertrand Massot
- Area^{1}: 4.43 km^{2} (1.71 sq mi)
- Elevation: 75 m (246 ft)
- Highest elevation: 158 m (518 ft)
- Lowest elevation: 125 m (410 ft)
- Population (2023): 6,945
  - Density: 1,570/km^{2} (4,060/sq mi)
- Time zone: UTC+01:00 (CET)
  - Summer (DST): UTC+02:00 (CEST)
- INSEE/Postal code: 28220 /28600
- ^{1} French Land Register data, which excludes lakes, ponds, glaciers > 1 km^{2} (0.386 sq mi or 247 acres) and river estuaries.

Luisant (French pronunciation: [lɥizɑ̃]) is a commune in the Eure-et-Loir department in northern France.

== Population ==
Historical population

Year	Pop.	±% p.a.
1831	514	—
1911	1,200	+1.07%
1946	1,714	+1.02%
1954	1,936	+1.53%
1962	3,063	+5.90%
1968	3,491	+2.20%
1975	4,950	+5.12%

Year	Pop.	±% p.a.
1982	5,444	+1.37%
1990	6,411	+2.06%
1999	6,622	+0.36%
2007	6,835	+0.40%
2012	6,757	−0.23%
2017	6,665	−0.27%
2023	6,945	+0.69%

Source: EHESS and INSEE (1968-2023)

== Twin towns ==
Luisant is twinned with:

- Hochstadt, Germany, since 1973
- Villanueva del Pardillo, Spain, since 2002
- Chions, Italy, since 2002

== See also ==
- Communes of the Eure-et-Loir department
