= Obertshausen =

- Town
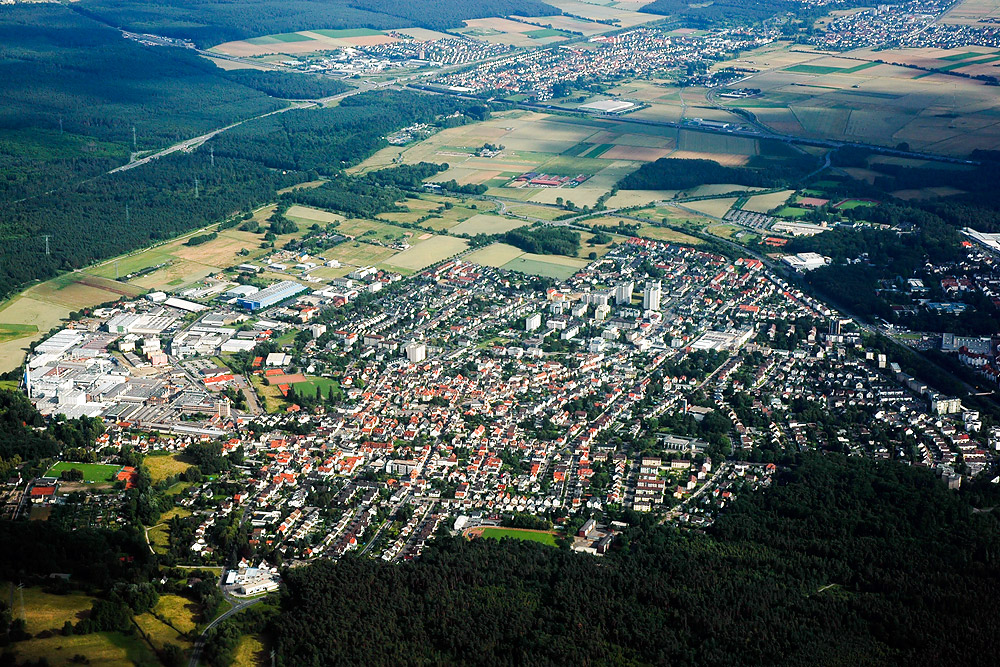
- Aerial view

- Flag Coat of arms

- Location of Obertshausen within Offenbach district
- Interactive map of Obertshausen
- Location within Germany Location within Hesse
- Coordinates: 50°4′N 8°50′E
- Country: Germany
- State: Hesse
- District: Offenbach
- Subdivisions: 2 Stadtteile

Government
  - Mayor (2020–26): Manuel Friedrich (Ind.)

Area
  - Total: 13.62 km^{2} (5.26 sq mi)
- Elevation: 113 m (371 ft)

Population (2025-12-31)
  - Total: 25,381
  - Density: 1,864/km^{2} (4,826/sq mi)
- Time zone: UTC+01:00 (CET)
  - Summer (DST): UTC+02:00 (CEST)
- Postal codes: 63179
- Dialling codes: 06104
- Vehicle registration: OF
- Website: www.obertshausen.de

Obertshausen (German: [oːbɐtsˈhaʊzn̩]) is a town in the Offenbach district in the Regierungsbezirk in the state of Hessen, Germany. It has around 24,000 inhabitants.

== Geography ==
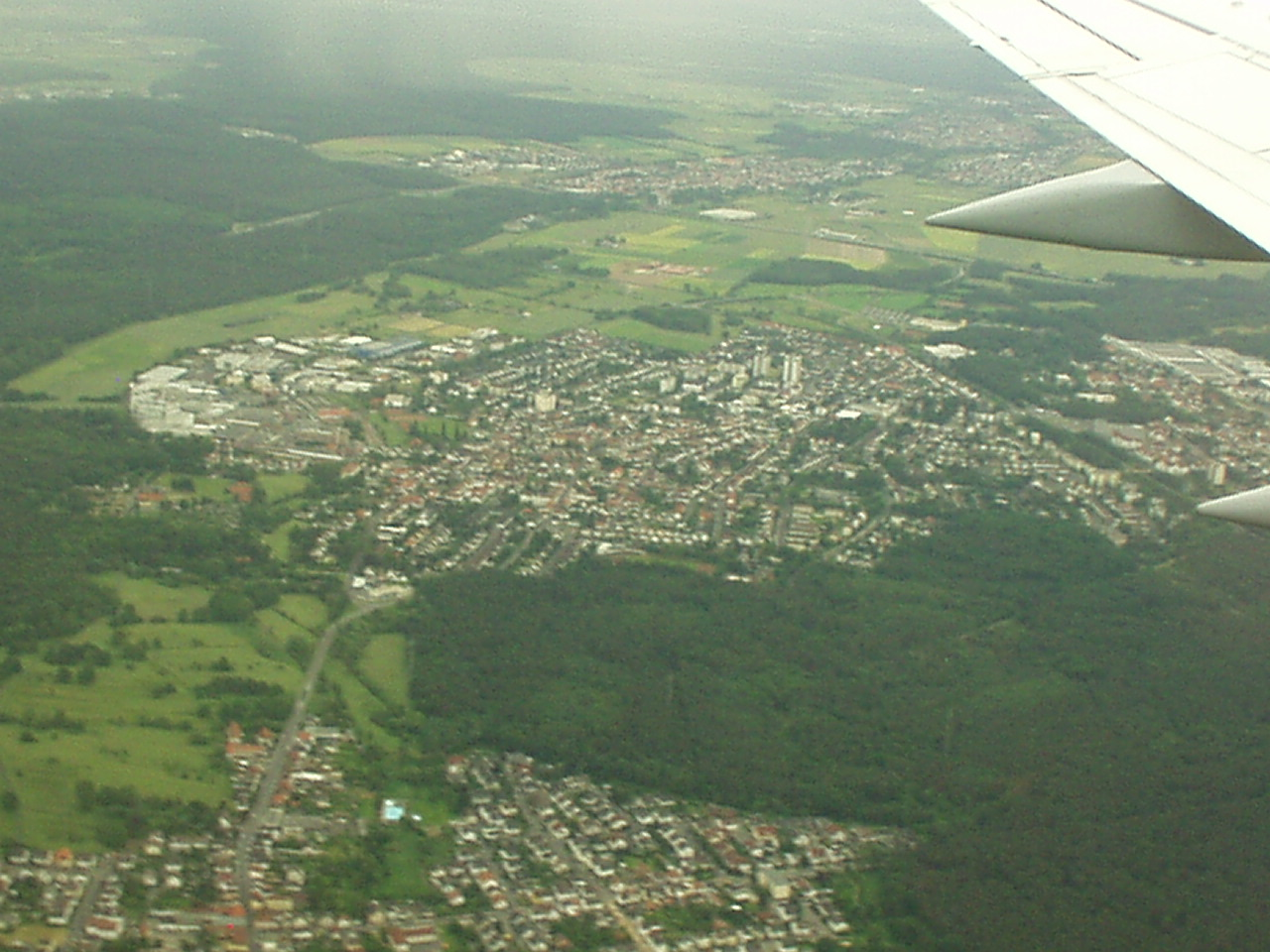
Obertshausen (centre of Hausen), in the foreground Mühlheim-Lämmerspiel

=== Location ===
Obertshausen is one of 13 towns and municipalities in the Offenbach district. The town lies in the thickly wooded eastern part of the Rhine-Main lowland south of the Main and southeast of Frankfurt am Main and Offenbach am Main at an elevation of 112 m above sea level. Southwest of the town is found Darmstadt, the seat of the like-named Regierungsbezirk. To the northeast lies the town of Hanau (Main-Kinzig-Kreis). Obertshausen lies in the southern part of Hesse, not far from the Odenwald and the Spessart.

=== Municipal area's extent ===
The municipal area stretches over 13.7 km^{2}, of which 7.8 km^{2} is woodland, open land and cropland

=== Neighbouring communities ===
Obertshausen borders in the northwest on the district-free city of Offenbach am Main with its outlying centres of Bieber and Tempelsee, in the north on the town of Mühlheim (centre of Lämmerspiel), in the northeast on the town of Hanau (Main-Kinzig-Kreis) with its outlying centres of Steinheim and Klein-Auheim, in the east on the community of Hainburg, in the southeast on the town of Rodgau (centre of Weiskirchen) and in the southwest on the town of Heusenstamm.

=== Constituent communities ===
Obertshausen's Stadtteile are Obertshausen and Hausen, each of which has roughly the same population.

== History ==
In 865, Obertshausen had its first documentary mention under the name Oberdueshuson in a paper from the Benedictine monastery at Seligenstadt as one of the monastery's landholdings. In 1069, Heinrich IV donated to Saint Jacob's Monastery in Mainz some newly cleared land in the Wildbann Dreieich (a royal hunting forest). The land lay near the village of Hyson in the Maingau. At this time, the Lords of Hagenhausen-Eppstein exercised lordly rights (Hoheitsrechte) in Obertshausen and Hausen. In Obertshausen stood a moated castle shaped like a defensive tower, called the Burgk im Hayn (or Burg im Hayn in modern German spelling). The Lords of Hausen, a sideline of those of Hagenhausen, once had holdings here.

In the Middle Ages, feudal lords changed very often. The Lords of Eppstein, Ullrich von Hanau and Archbishop Conrad III of Mainz were some of the land's owners. In 1425, Hausen and Obertshausen, as part of the Amt of Steinheim, w sold by the Lords of Eppstein to Electoral Mainz. The Thirty Years' War and the Plague in 1636 took a heavy toll on the population.

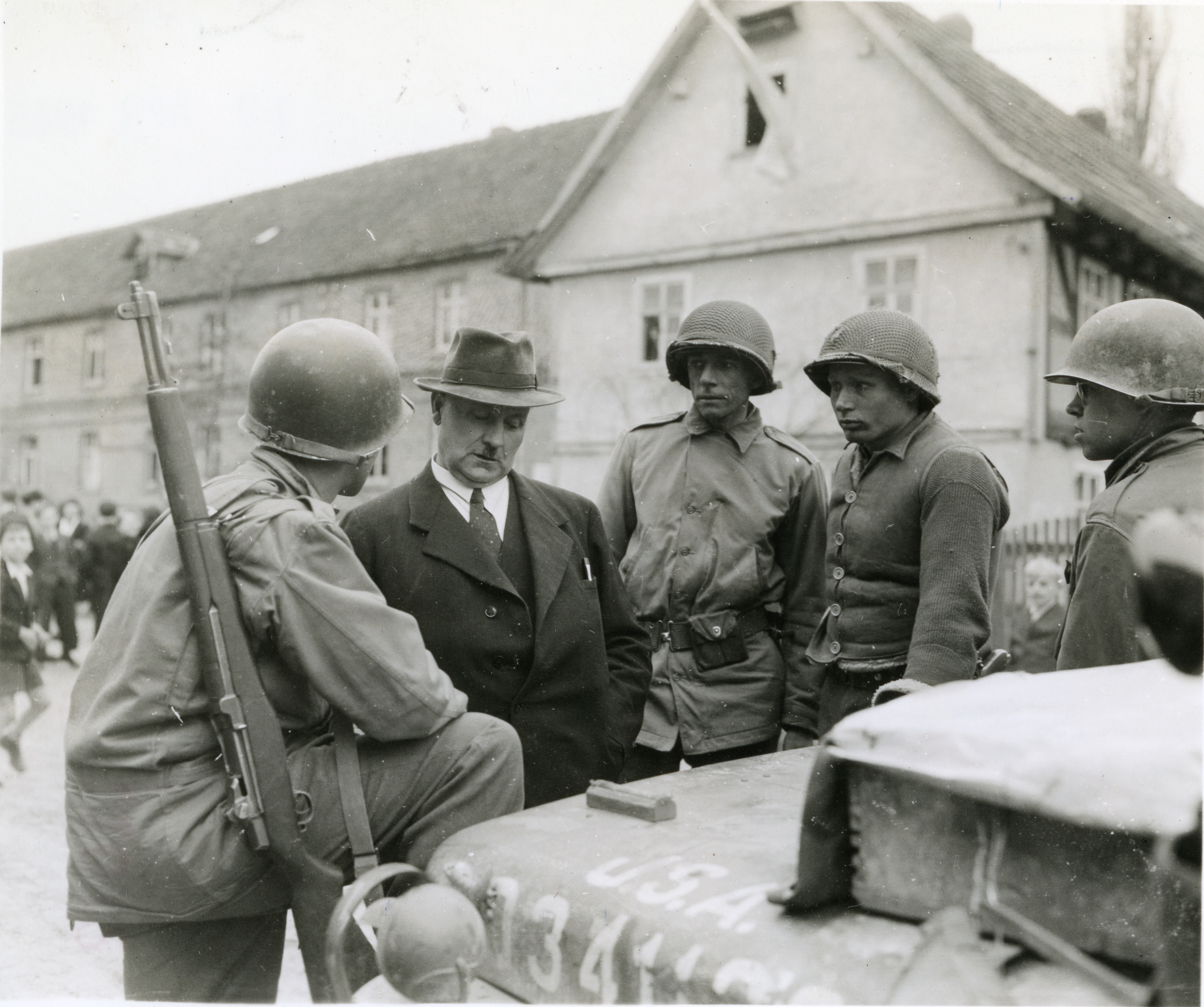
3rd U.S. Army soldiers order the mayor of Obertshausen that all arms are to be turned in immediately. 2 April 1945

In 1664, Archbishop Johann Philipp of Mainz sold his brother Philipp Erwin of Schönborn the two villages for 9,000 Gulden. In 1806, the Schönborn Amt of Heusenstamm with Hausen and Obertshausen was mediatized into the Principality of Isenburg, which was in turn mediatised ten years later. Both places then passed with the Isenburg Amt of Offenbach to the Grand Duchy of Hesse, and as of 1945, to the state of Hesse. From the Middle Ages until 1819, Obertshausen and Hausen belonged to the Biebermark, an area held in common with several other villages. In 1819, the Biebermark was divided among the member villages.

In 1896, the Offenbach-Dieburg railway opened with a railway station in Obertshausen.

In the course of municipal reform in Hesse, the two formerly self-administering communities of Obertshausen and Hausen were merged. At first, the new community was named Hausen. On 1 January 1978, however, it was named Obertshausen. The two centres are separated from each other by Bundesstraße 448. On 29 September 1979, the Hesse state government granted Obertshausen town rights.

=== Population development ===
In 1576 there were 10 households in Hausen and 27 in Obertshausen. In 1834, Hausen's population had risen to 444 and Obertshausen's to 554. These figures have risen to many times these old levels over the years since then. By 1939, the figures had become 2,034 and 2,444 respectively. On 30 June 2007, the town as a whole had 25,314 inhabitants, of whom 12,668 lived in Hausen and 12,646 in Obertshausen.

Inhabitants (each time as at 31 December)

- 1998 – 24,522
- 1999 – 24,577
- 2000 – 24,658
- 2001 – 24,676
- 2002 – 24,521
- 2003 – 24,484
- 2004 – 24,532
- 2005 – 25,434
- 2006 – 24,210

== Politics ==
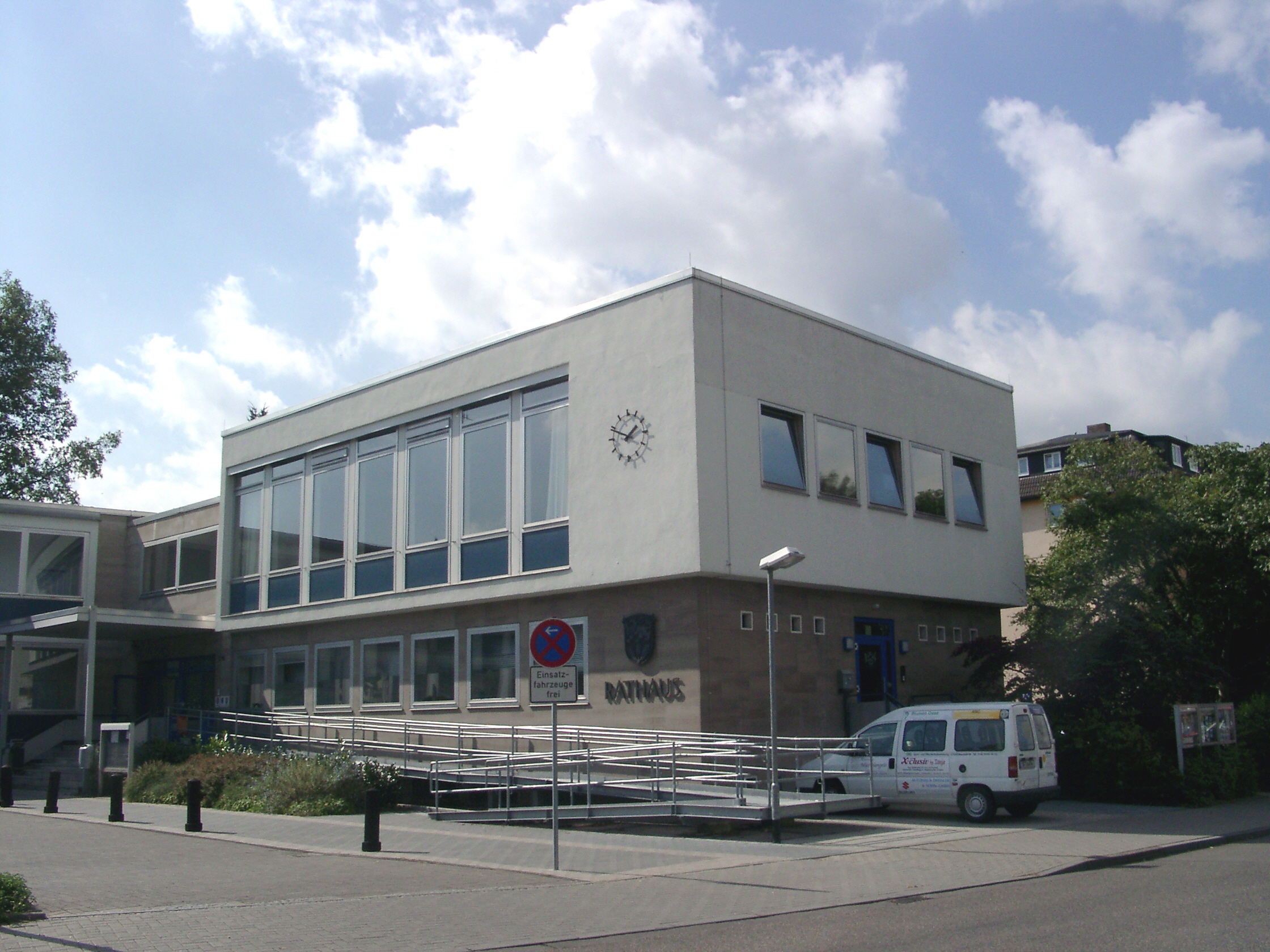
Obertshausen Town Hall

=== Town council ===
The municipal election held on 26 March 2006 yielded the following results:

Parties and voter communities		% 2006	Seats; 2006	% 2001	Seats; 2001
CDU	Christian Democratic Union of Germany	49.9	18	51.8	19
SPD	Social Democratic Party of Germany	19.3	7	25.6	10
GREENS	Bündnis 90/Die Grünen	10.3	4	9.9	4
FDP	Free Democratic Party	10.6	4	6.3	2
Bürger	Bürger für Obertshausen	9.9	4	6.3	2
Total		100.0	37	100.0	37
Voter turnout in %		42.5		51.0	

=== Mayor ===
Mayoral elections take place in Obertshausen every six years. The most recent mayors were:

- 2002–2014: Bernd Roth (CDU)
- 2014–2020: Roger Winter (independent)
- 2020–incumbent: Manuel Friedrich (independent)

=== Coat of arms ===
The town’s arms might be described thus: Party per fess abased dancetty of three, gules a lion passant crowned Or, his paws on the peaks of the parting, argent in base an oak sprig with two leaves and one acorn vert.

=== Flag ===
The town's flag has a white field in the middle flanked by a red stripe at each side, and in the upper half are the town's arms.

== Culture and sightseeing ==
=== Museums ===
- Heimatmuseum at Karl-Mayer-Haus with permanent and changing exhibits on local history.

=== Events ===
- At the Hausen Bürgerhaus (community centre), mainly in the winter months, theatrical and cabaret productions regularly take place.
- In the session chamber at the Town Hall on Beethovenstraße, except during summer holidays, older films are shown fortnightly for children and youth.
- With the Hausen Bürgerhaus and the Obertshausen multipurpose hall, there are venues for major events and concerts at the town's disposal.

=== Buildings ===
- Hausener Marktplatz (marketplace) with its artwork consisting of three hands, each holding a coat of arms, both Obertshausen's, and its two earlier partner towns'.
- Remains of the Burg im Hain (castle)
- Catholic church Herz Jesu (Sacred Heart) in Obertshausen, Bahnhofstraße
- Catholic St. Josef-Kirche in Hausen, Seligenstädter Straße
- Catholic St. Pius-Kirche in Hausen, Gumbertseestraße
- Catholic church St. Thomas Morus in Obertshausen, Berliner Straße
- Protestant Waldkirche („Forest Church”) in Hausen, Schönbornstraße
- Small chapel in Obertshausen, Heusenstammer Straße
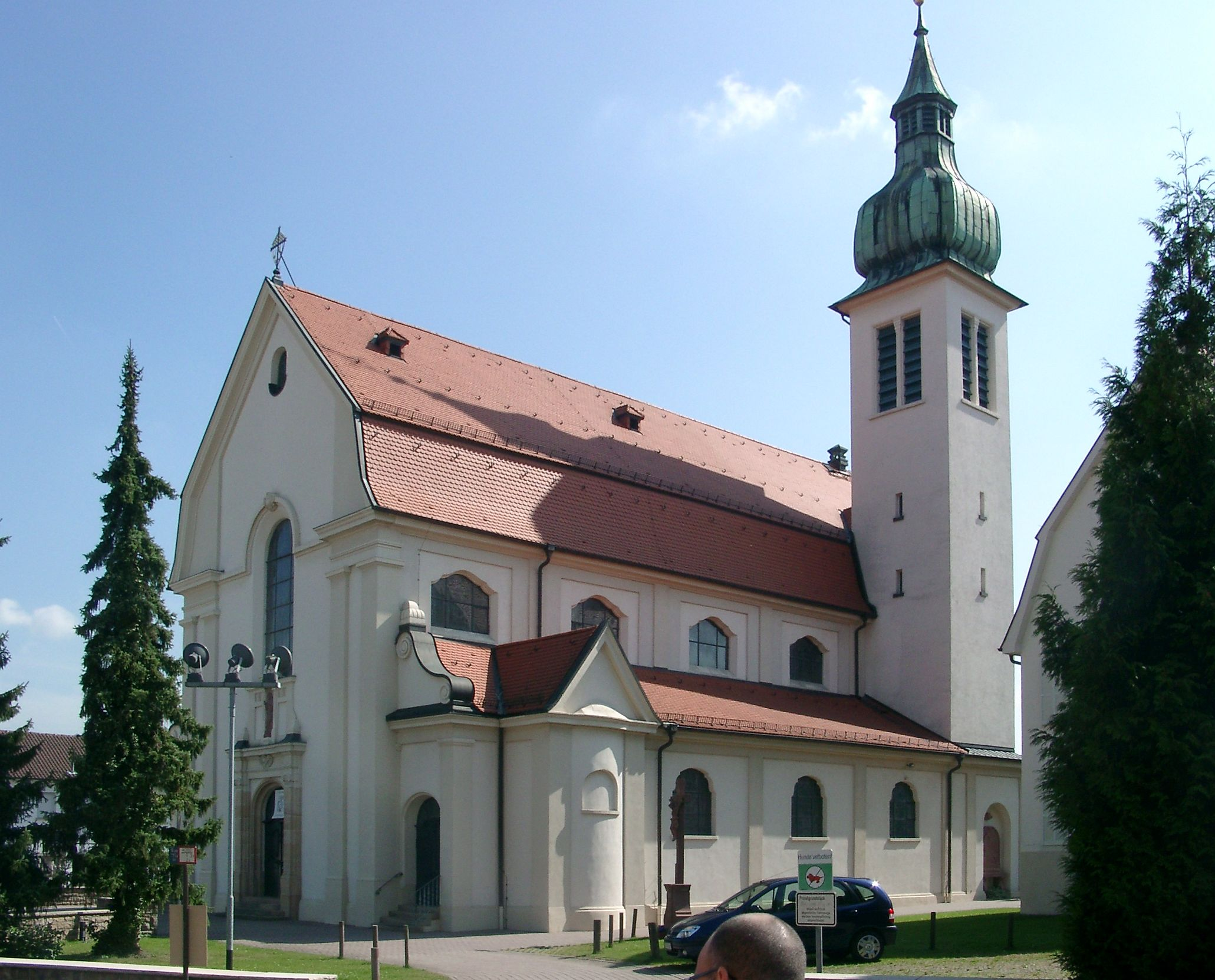
Herz Jesu

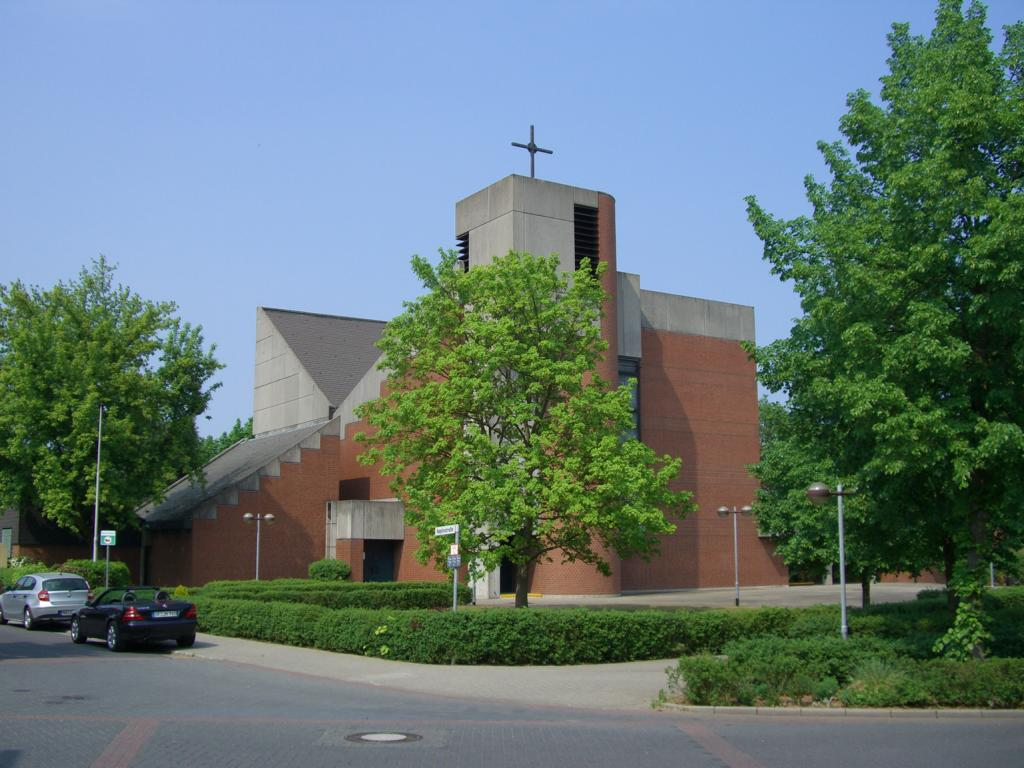
St. Thomas Morus

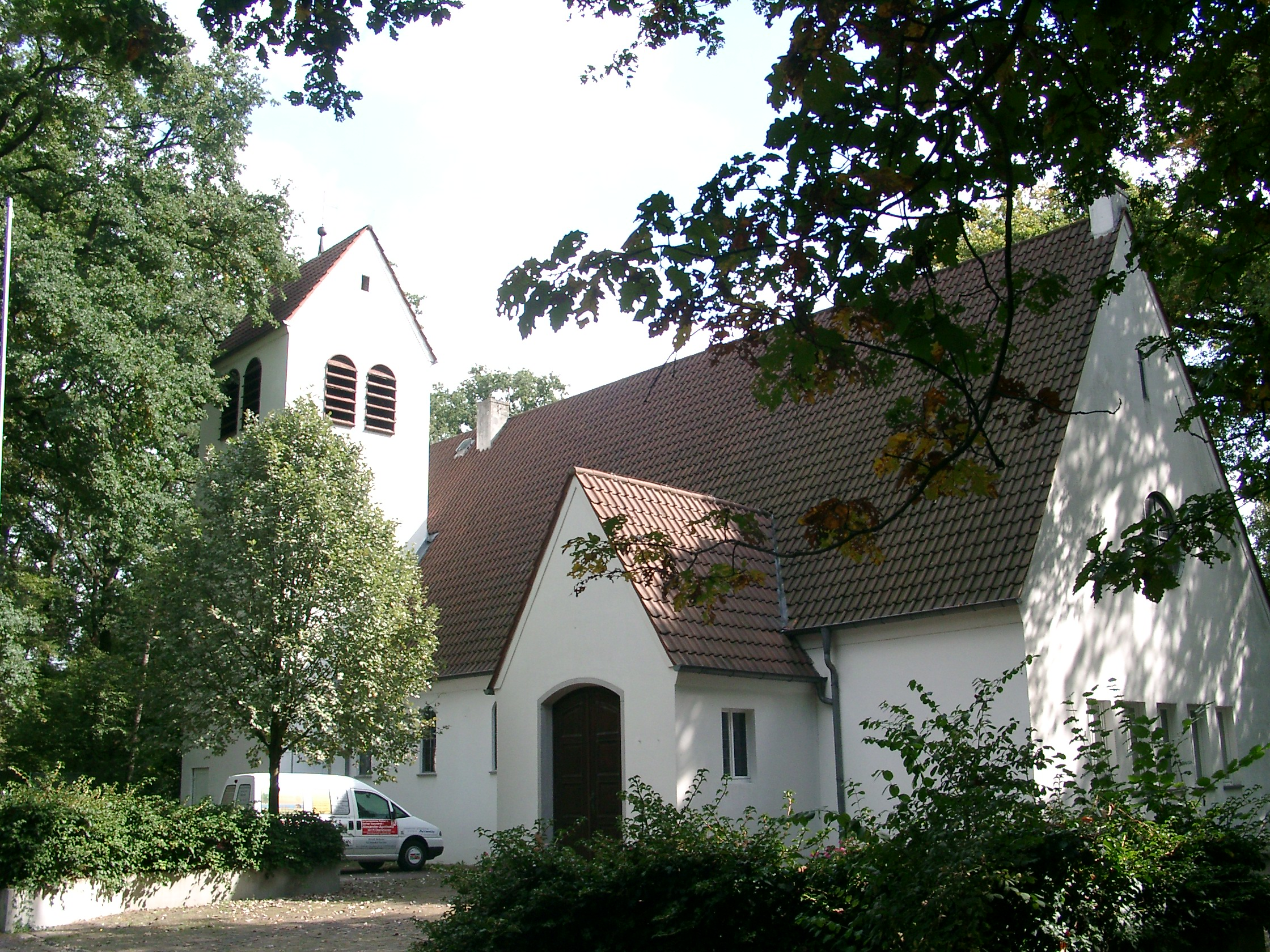
Waldkirche

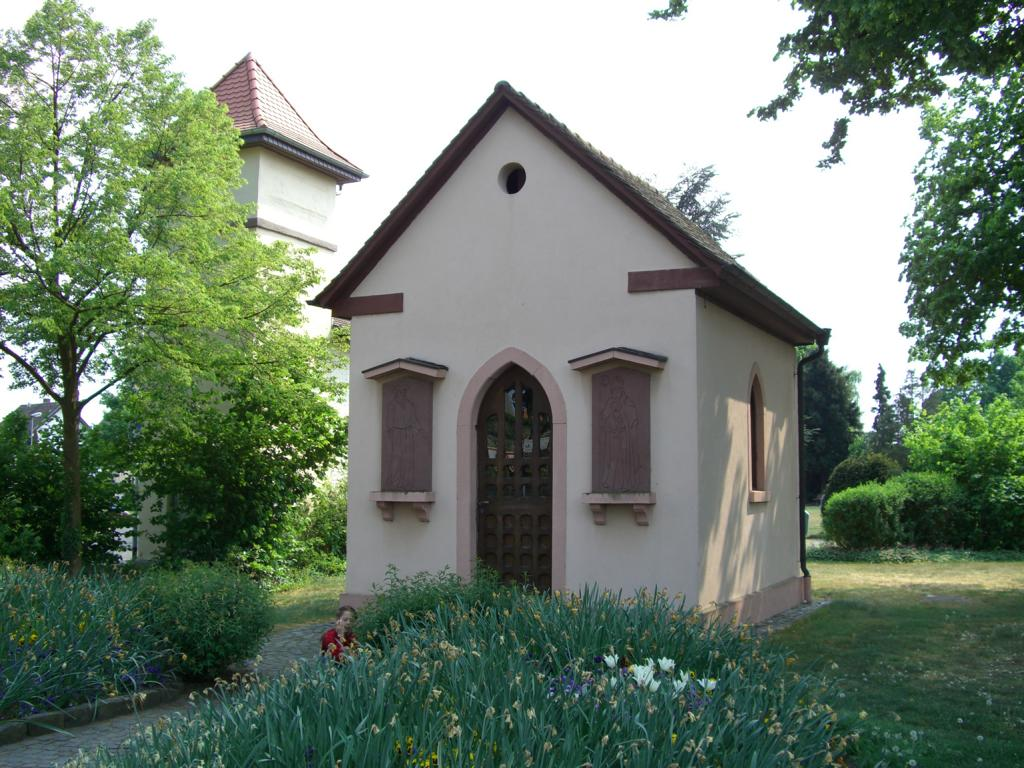
Chapel

=== Parks ===
- Waldpark Sainte Geneviève des Bois in Hausen with children's playground and kiosk
- Leisure park in Obertshausen with adventure playground and ice-cream café and kiosk across the street
- Miniature golf course at the Hausen community centre (Bürgerhaus)

=== Sport ===
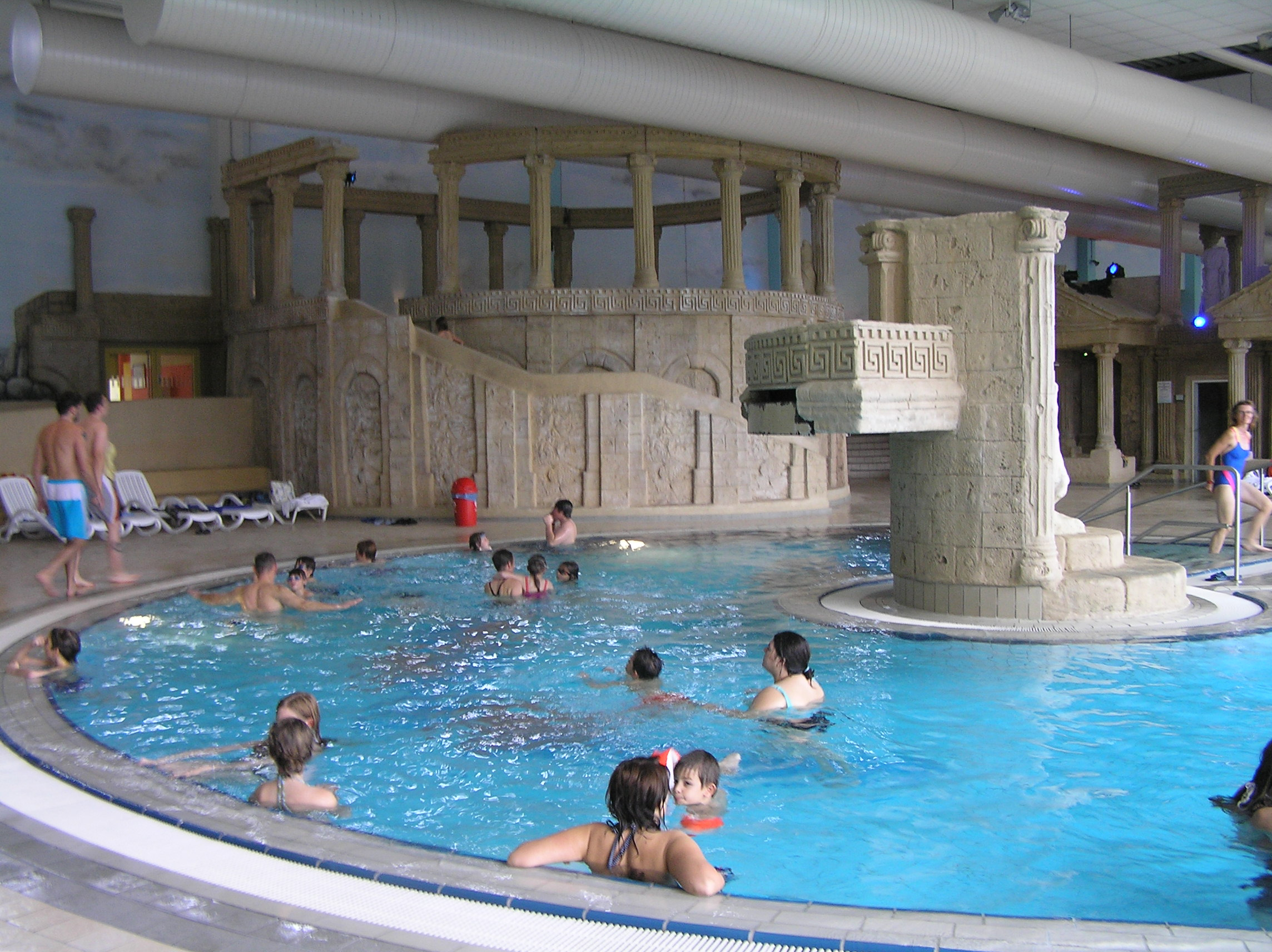
monte mare adventure pool Obertshausen

The monte mare is an outdoor swimming pool, leisure pool and sauna. Originally opened under the name Atlantis, after the operator's insolvency in 2005 it became part of the monte mare Group.

There is also a sport centre at the Waldschwimmbad ("Forest swimming pool")

=== Clubs ===
Obertshausen has 124 registered clubs.

== Economy and infrastructure ==
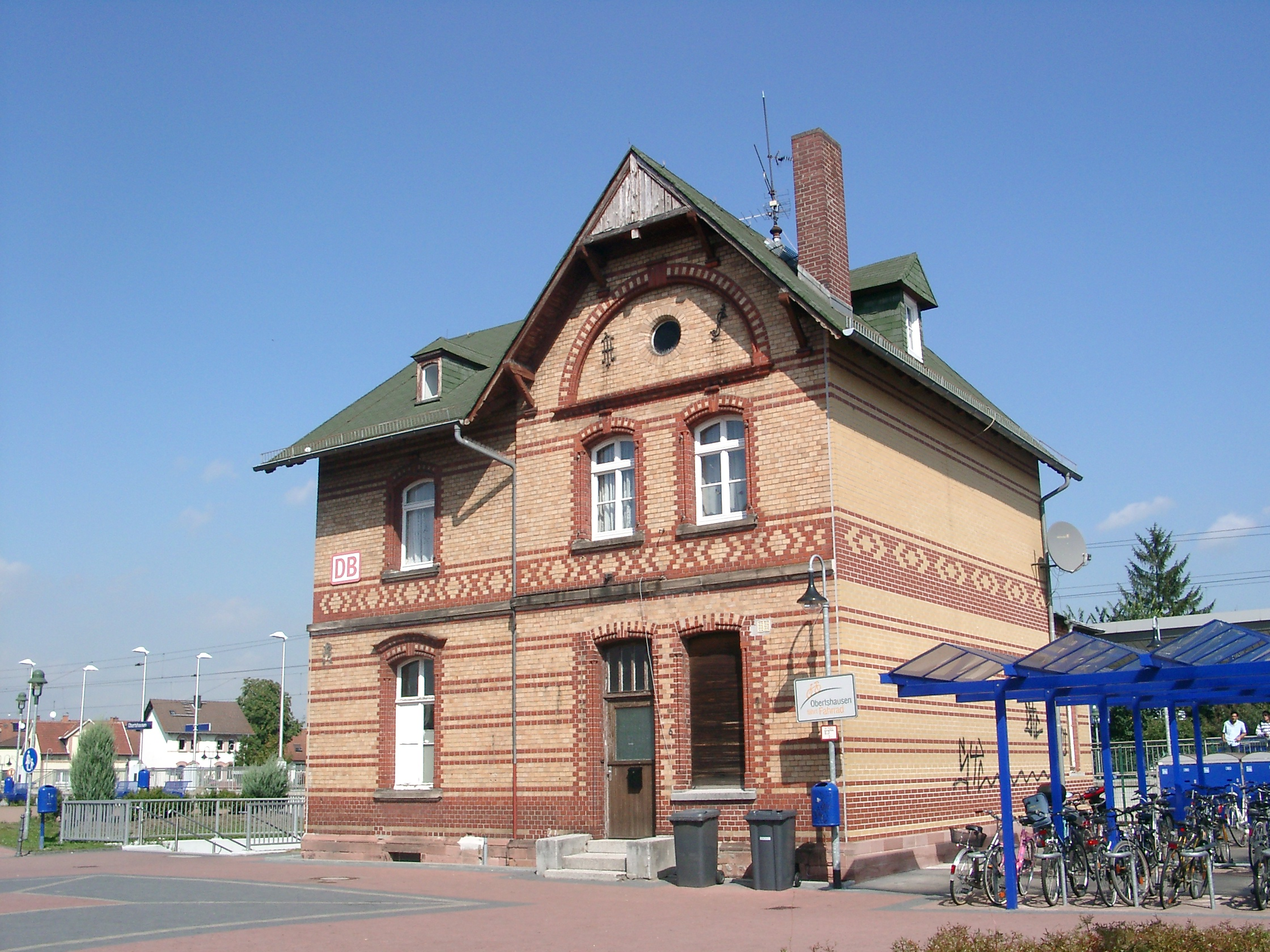
Railway station

=== Transport ===
Since late 2003, the town has been linked by line S1 to the Rhine-Main S-Bahn network. The Wiesbaden-Frankfurt-Offenbach-Rodgau-Rödermark-Ober Roden route runs through Obertshausen. At one time, Obertshausen was linked to the railway network by the Rodgaubahn. Lying right on the A 3 is Frankfurt Airport, which through the Frankfurter Kreuz can be reached in a short time, as can likewise Frankfurt Egelsbach Airport. Obertshausen benefits from its proximity to the economic hub of Frankfurt am Main and the Frankfurt Rhine Main Region, as well as the good transport connections.

Within the town run several buslines, among them the Offenbach route 120, which links Obertshausen to the town's other centre, Hausen, and also Mühlheim and Offenbach.

=== Economy ===
For a long time Obertshausen, alongside Offenbach am Main, was a national centre for leather goods production. Still today, there are leather goods factories that export their goods worldwide. With the decline of the leather goods industry, mechanical engineering has come to dominate the town's industry today. Many inhabitants also find jobs in nearby Frankfurt am Main. Kaufkraft (purchasing power) in Obertshausen in 2003 averaged €19,315 per inhabitant, putting it at 116.3% of the countrywide average.

=== Established businesses ===
- Karl Mayer Textilmaschinenfabrik (textile machine manufacturer)
- Magna Exterior Systems GmbH
- Holzland Becker GmbH & Co. KG
- Feintool
- PICARD Lederwaren GmbH & Co. KG (leather goods)
- YMOS AG, former car supply industry

=== Media ===
- Offenbach-Post – the publishing house has its headquarters in Offenbach am Main and it reports regularly about Obertshausen in the regional section.
- Heimatbote – Regional newspaper for Obertshausen, reports about events in Obertshausen (in the interim under the Offenbach-Post's umbrella)
- Dreieich-Spiegel
- Dreieich-Zeitung

=== Schools ===
==== Primary schools ====
- Friedrich-Fröbel-Schule
- Joseph-von-Eichendorff-Schule
- Sonnentauschule
- Waldschule

==== Secondary schools ====
- Georg-Kerschensteiner-Schule
- Hermann-Hesse-Schule

=== Kindergartens ===
In the constituent community of Hausen, three municipal kindergartens and one Catholic one are available. Obertshausen has three municipal kindergartens and two ecclesiastical ones. Moreover, the district's first forest kindergarten is in the town.

== Twin towns – sister cities ==
Obertshausen is twinned with:

- Sainte-Geneviève-des-Bois, France (1971)
- Laakirchen, Austria (1972)
- Meiningen, Germany (2007)

== Notable people ==
- Walter Picard (1923–2000), paedagogue and politician (CDU), Member of the Bundestag
- Sven Väth (born 1964), DJ and musician, pioneer of the German Techno scene
- Finn Wiebelhaus (born 2006), racing driver

=== Honorary citizens ===
- Hildegard Bühl
- Peter Döbert (1907–1994)
- Robert Flügel (1909–1990)
- Kurt Formhals (1914–2009)
- Heide Heß (born 1940)
- Johann Karl Kämmerer (1870–1957)
- Valentin Mahr (1908–1972)
- Karl Mayer (1909–1995)
- Ulrich Mayer
- Robert Pappert (1930–2010)
- Josef Pieroth (1885–1957)
- Robert Roth (1929–2015)
- Eric Christian Schreiber, Sr. (1921–2008)
- Pfarrer Peter Valentin Schwahn (1889–1964)
- Marie Friederike Vetter (1904–1995)
- Leonhard Wilhelm (1883–1960)
- Jakob Wolf (1899–1982)
