= Maintal–Dörnigheim Ferry =

Cable ferry across Main river in Hesse, Germany

Coordinates: 50.130029°N 8.836623°E

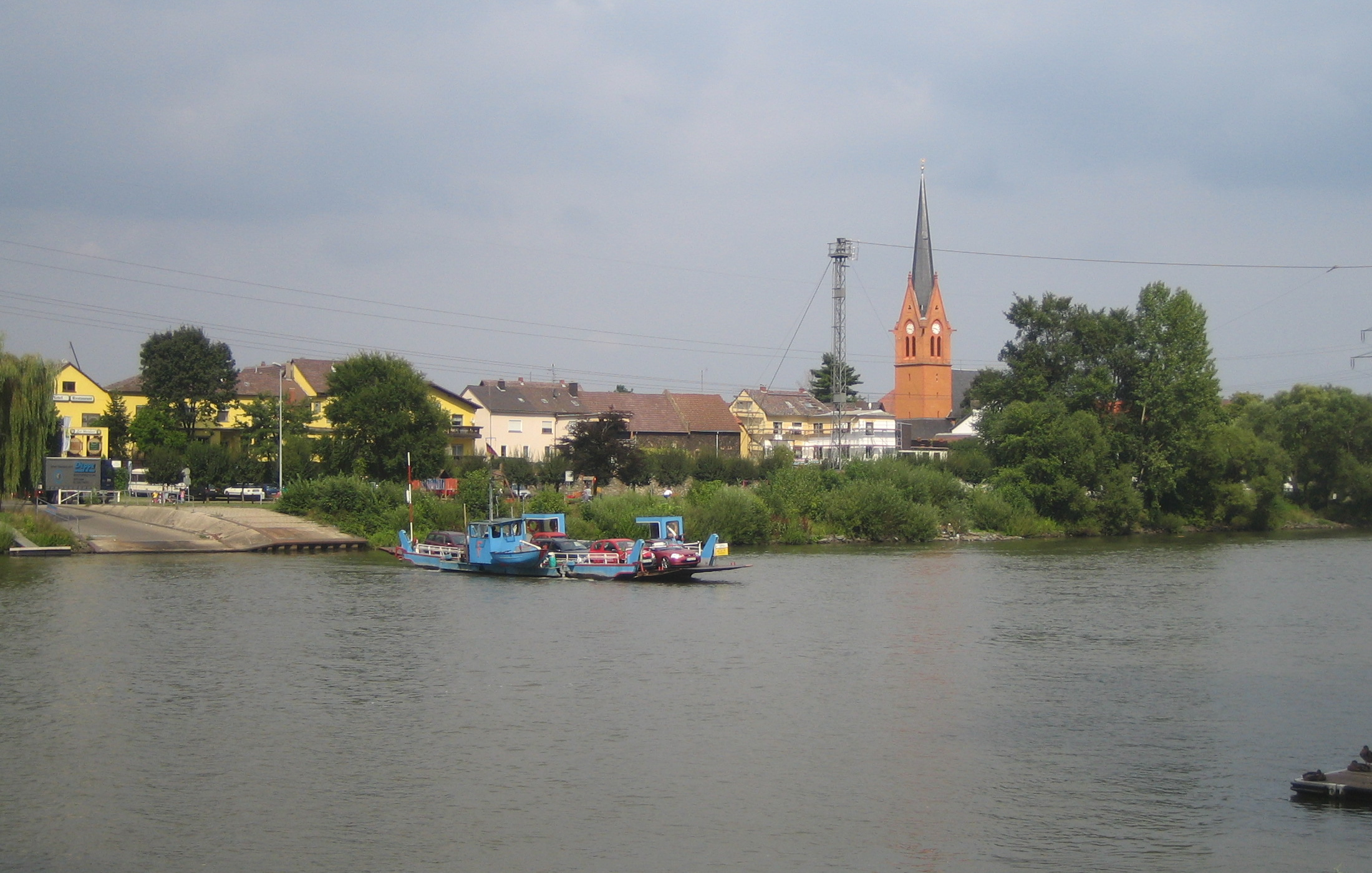
The Maintal-Dörnigheim Ferry.

The Maintal–Dörnigheim Ferry, also known as the Mühlheim am Main to Dörnigheim Ferry, was a vehicular cable ferry across the Main river in Hesse, Germany. The ferry crossed between the Dörnigheim district of the town of Maintal, on the right bank of the river, and Mühlheim am Main opposite. On 24 June 2020 the ferry was permanently retired.
