= Hochstadt, Maintal =

District of the city of Maintal, Germany

Hochstadt
- Stadtteil of Maintal
- Coat of arms
- Interactive map of Hochstadt
- Location within Germany Location within Hesse
- Coordinates: 50°09′12″N 8°50′06″E
- Country: Germany
- State: Hesse
- Admin. region: Darmstadt
- District: Main-Kinzig-Kreis
- Town: Maintal

Population (2023-12-31)
  - Total: 6,202
- Time zone: UTC+01:00 (CET)
  - Summer (DST): UTC+02:00 (CEST)
- Postal codes: 63477
- Dialling codes: 06181
- Vehicle registration: ERB

Hochstadt (German pronunciation: [ˈhoːxʃtat]) is a district of the city of Maintal in Hesse, Germany. As of 2023, it has a population of 6,202.

== History ==
Hochstadt's existence was first documented in the year 846.

In 1974 Hochstadt lost its independence and merged with three other towns, Bischofsheim, Dörnigheim and Wachenbuchen, a district of the newly formed city of Maintal.
