= Wachenbuchen =

Coordinates: 50°10′05″N 8°51′26″E

Arms of Wachenbuchen

Wachenbuchen (German pronunciation: [ˈvaxn̩ˌbuːxn̩]) is the smallest district in the city of Maintal, Hesse, Germany. It is about 17 km east of Frankfurt am Main.
