= Public transport in Frankfurt am Main =

Overview of public transport in the German city

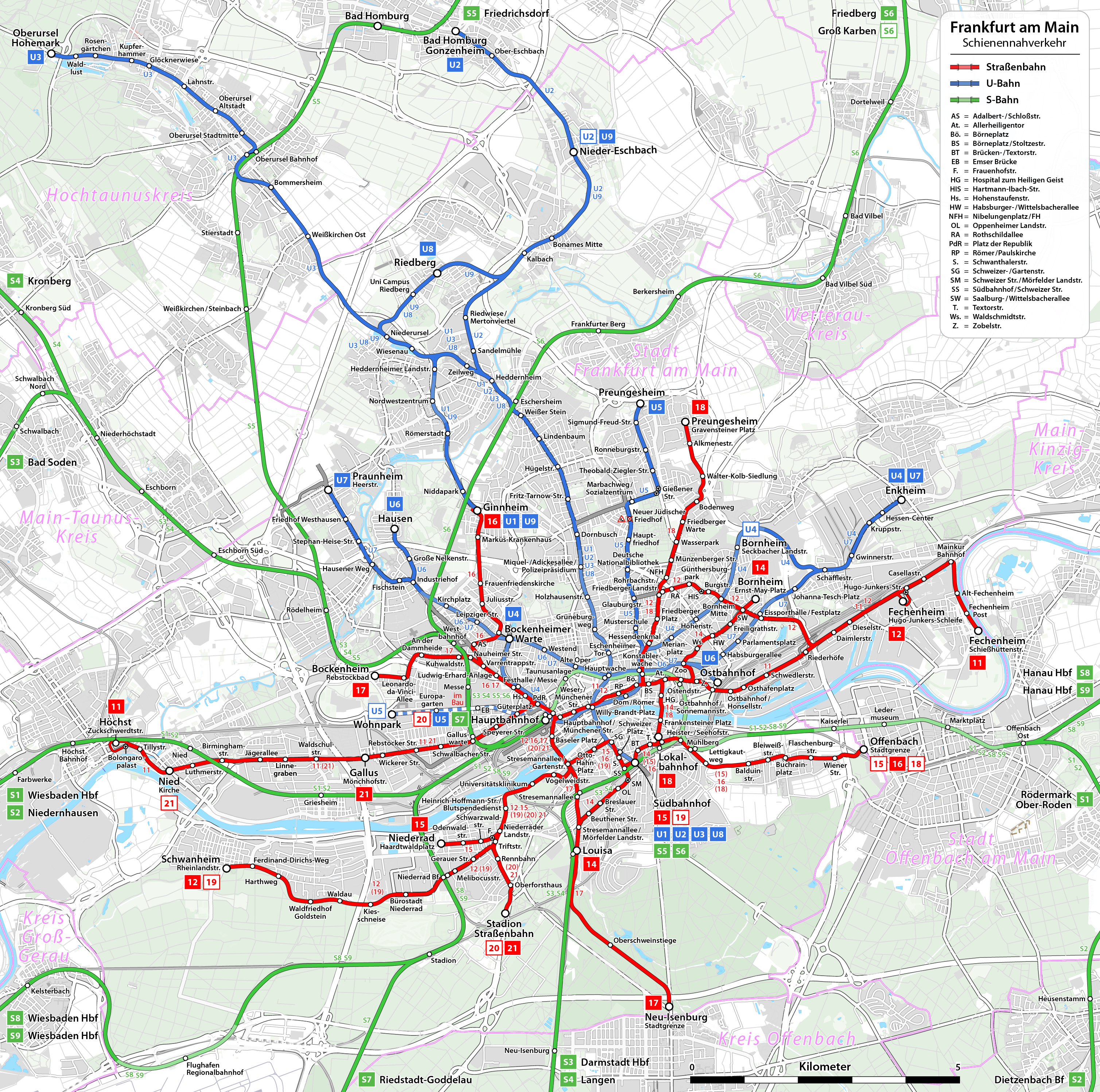
Topographical map of S-Bahn, U-Bahn and tram lines. An additional station, Frankfurt am Main Gateway Gardens, now exists between Stadion and Flughafen Regionalbahnhof

The public transport system in Frankfurt is part of the Rhein-Main-Verkehrsverbund (abbreviated: RMV) transport network and consists of several carriers who all use the same fare system. Therefore, one ticket is valid for a journey which may include several modes of transit run by different operators. The fares are paid in advance of travel at a ticket vending machine or at the driver on board a bus. There are no turnstiles or other controlling barriers; instead, a proof-of-payment system is used. Plainclothes fare inspectors are employed and carry out random checks to ensure passengers have paid. If found to be travelling without a ticket, then they are required to pay a fine.

== S-Bahn ==
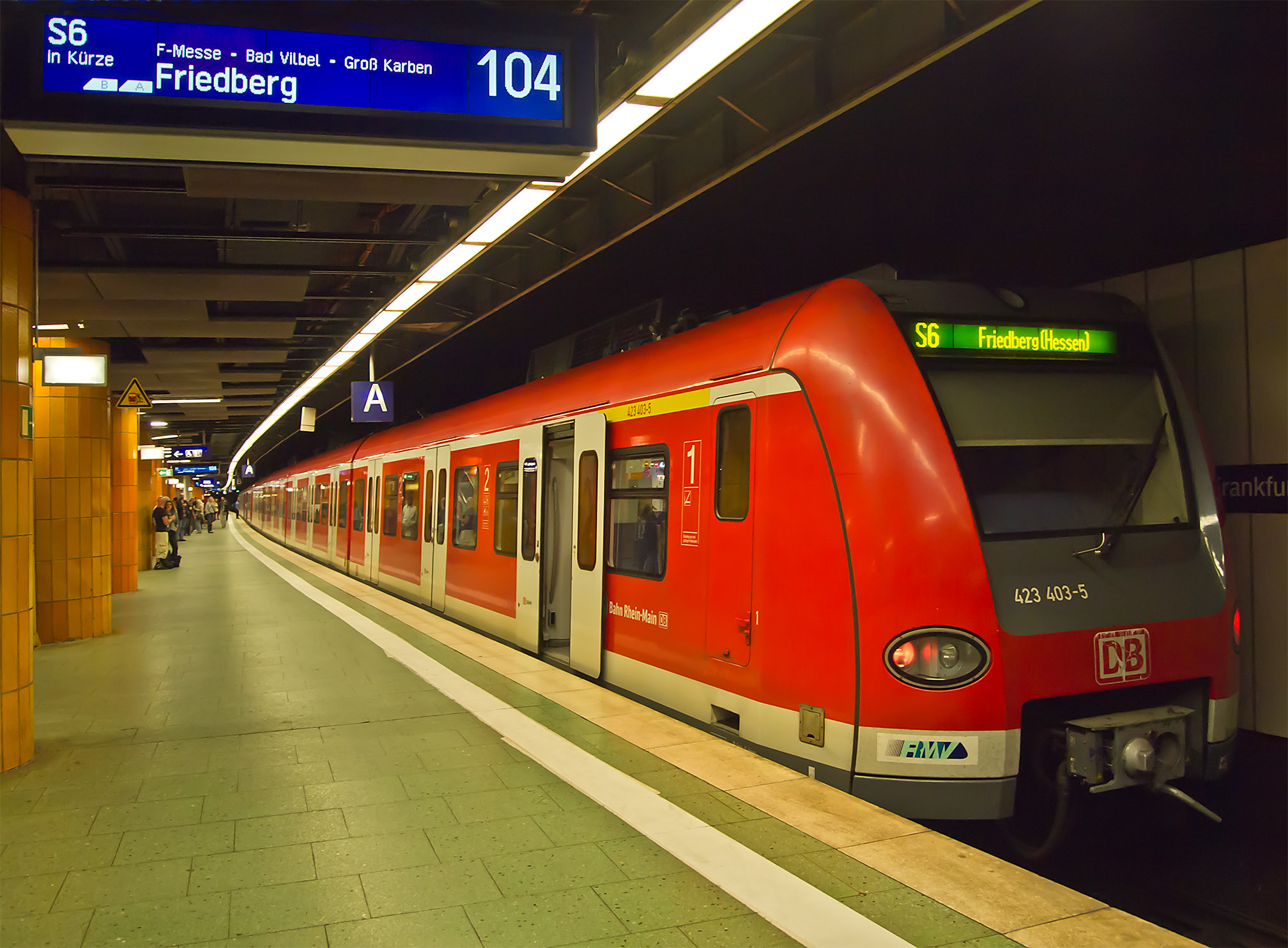
S-Bahn at Hauptbahnhof tief (Central station underground)

The Rhine-Main S-Bahn is a suburban rail system serving the Rhein-Main Region, of which Frankfurt itself is the central city. The service caters the large number of commuters who travel to and from the suburbs each day. All but one of the lines run together through the City Tunnel under the city centre, and then go their separate ways at either end. In the suburban sections they are generally double-tracked or share mainline tracks with other regional, long distance passenger and cargo trains.

The trains can be up to 200 m (660 ft) long and have a maximum speed of 140 km/h (87 mph). Electricity supply is provided by overhead wires at the standard German railroad voltage of 15 kV AC.

The normal service interval on each of the lines is 15 or 30 min, but on the shared central sections a train runs approximately every 2 minutes during rush hour and the S8/S9 runs 24/7.

== Trams ==
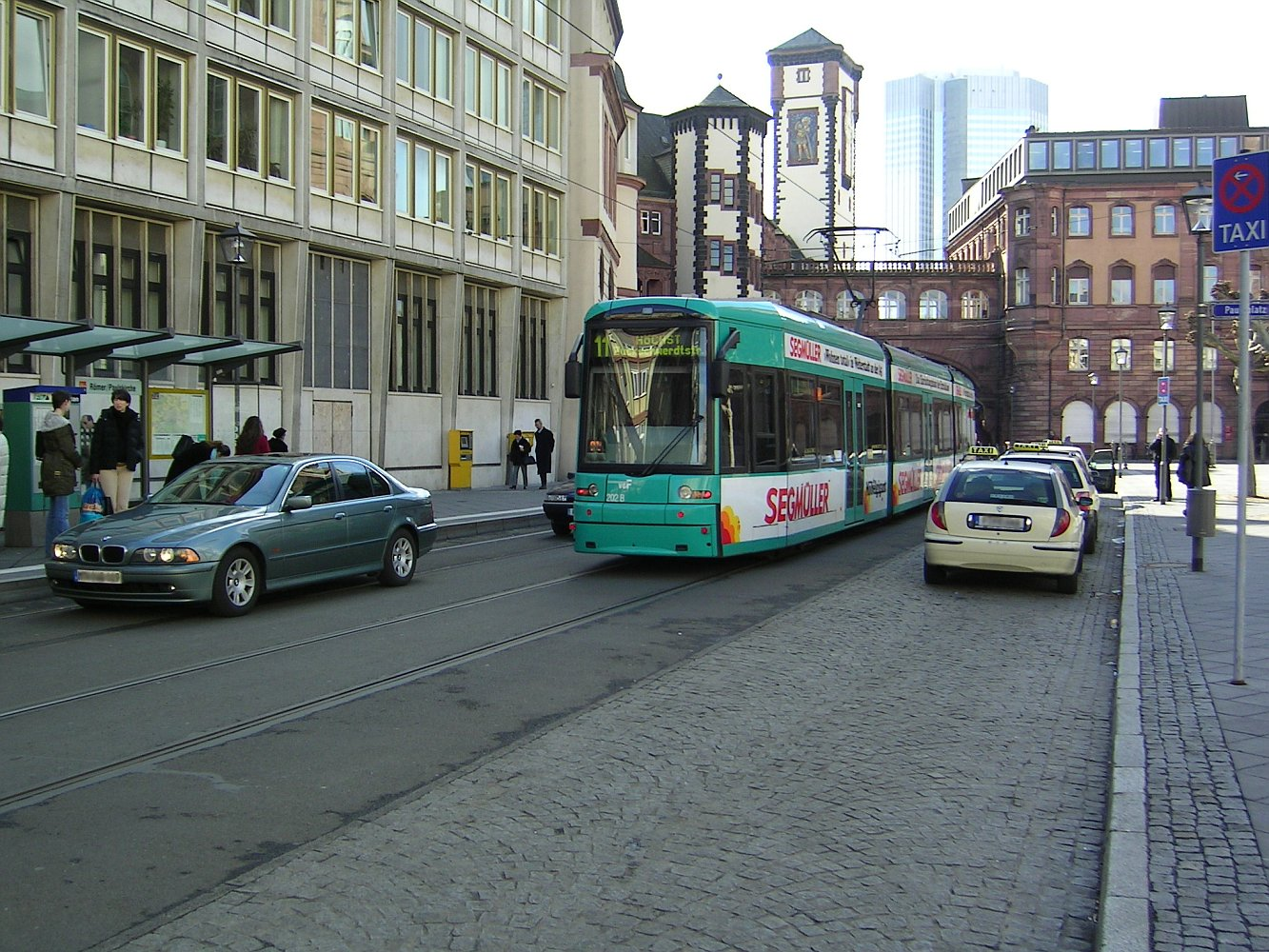
A Flexity Classic tram in the Altstadt

There are 10 tram lines, with trams usually running every 10 min. Many sections are served by two lines, combining to give a 5-minute frequency during rush-hour.

The construction of the underground network since the 1960s has resulted in the trams losing some of their importance to the city's transport infrastructure. Despite this, two new sections have been constructed in recent years. It is now appreciated that trams are more attractive to the travelling public than buses and cheaper to build than underground railways. Therefore, neighbourhoods with medium transit usage are either currently served by tram routes or will be in future.

== Underground ==
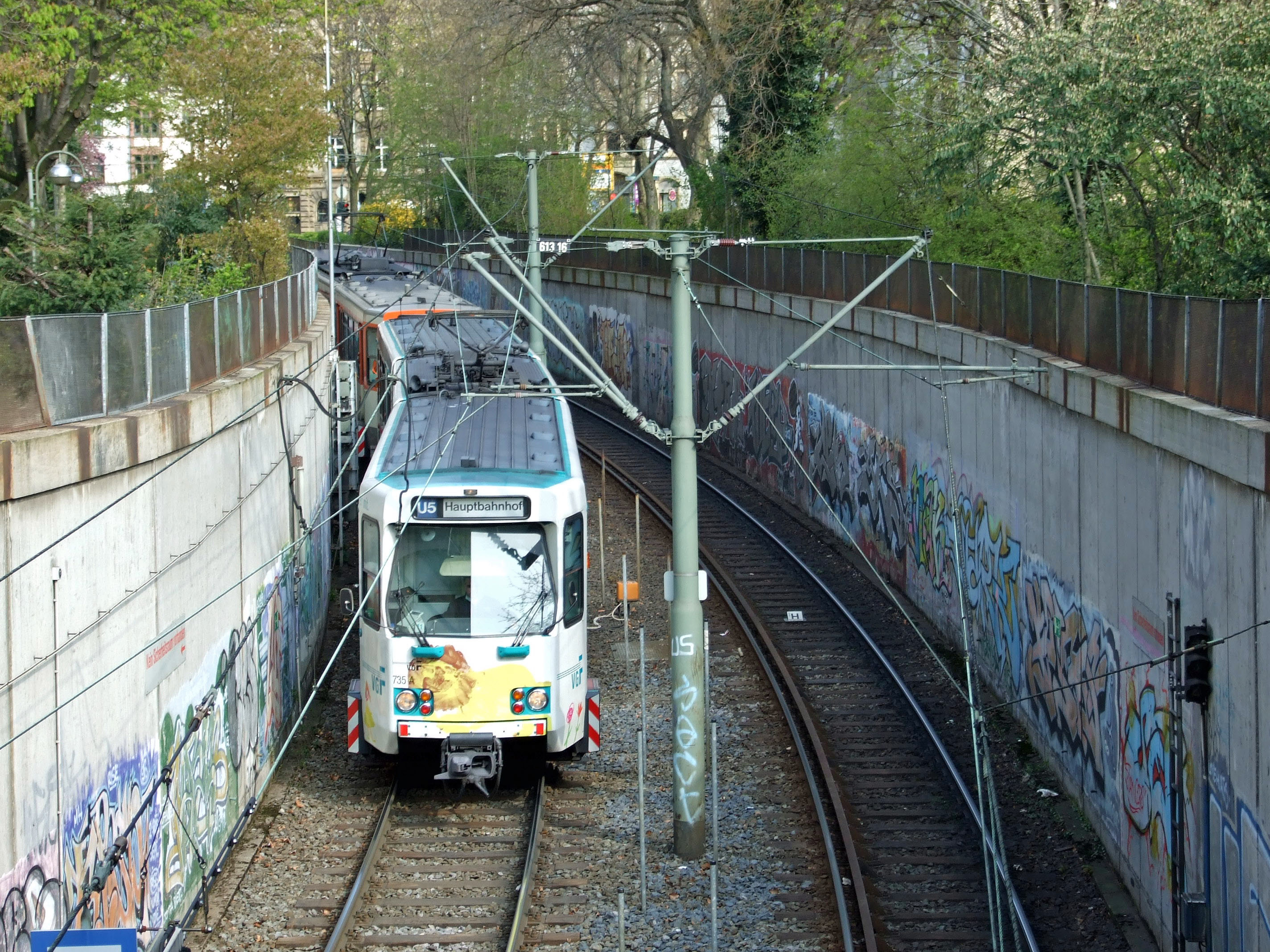
Frankfurt underground U5 line train on the way to Konstablerwache station

The U-Bahn is a Stadtbahn system with nine lines, running on three main routes.

- The U1, U2, U3 and U8 run from Frankfurt South railway station to the north of the city on a common route. They then split and serve Nordweststadt (U1) the town of Bad Homburg (U2), Oberursel (U3) and Riedberg (U8).
- The U4 and U5 share a common tunnel through the city centre from Frankfurt Central railway station to Konstablerwache. U4 runs from Bockenheimer Warte via Messe Frankfurt and the city centre to Bornheim (Frankfurt am Main) and Enkheim. U5 runs from Frankfurt Central railway station to Preungesheim.
- The U6 and U7 also share a common tunnel through the city centre. U6 runs from Heerstraße in the west to Frankfurt East railway station. U7 runs from Hausen in the north-west, to Bergen-Enkheim in the east.
- The U9 is the only line not to run through the city centre. It connects Ginnheim and Nieder-Eschbach in the north of Frankfurt on tracks also used by the U1, U8 and U2.

In the city centre sections the U-Bahn tracks are underground, but they run on reserved track at ground level in the suburbs. The minimum service interval is 2.5 minutes, although the usual pattern is that each line runs with a 7.5- to 10-minute frequency which combines to approx 3–5 minutes on the city centre sections served by more than one line.

The trains can be as long as 100 m (330 ft) and have a maximum speed of 80 km/h (50 mph). Cars are equipped with indicators and rear view mirrors and are powered from overhead wires.

== Bus ==
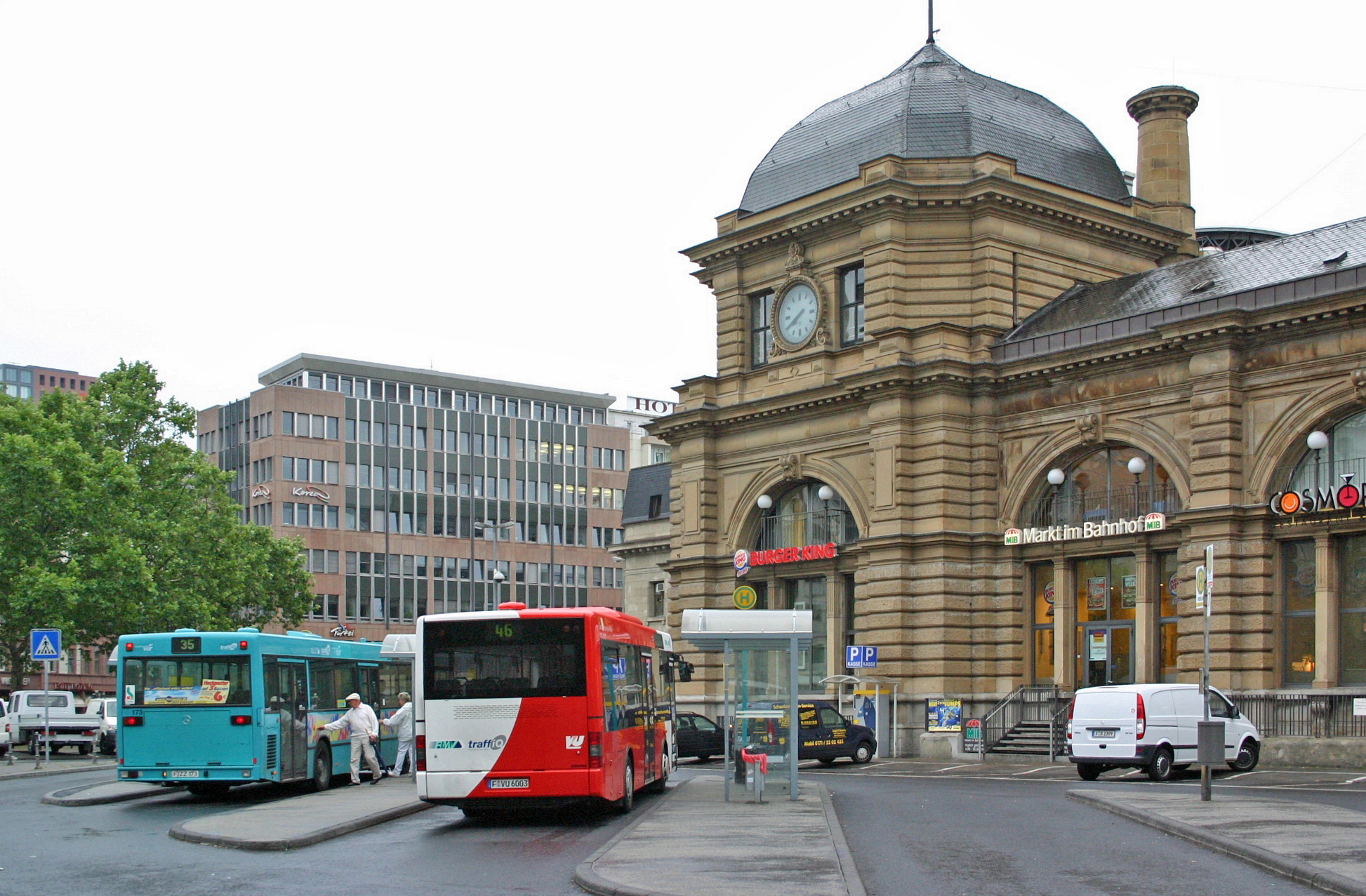
City buses in Frankfurt

Buses play a minor role in Frankfurt transit since all major routes are served by rail based modes of transportation. There are, however, several cross-town bus routes, especially in the north. Buses are also used as feeder services for the underground lines.

=== Franchises ===
There are currently proposals for a shake-up of the way bus services are run. Instead of being operated by Frankfurt Transit Company, the routes could be split into different franchises which any European bus operator may tender to run. The organisation offering the cheapest proposal would then be given a contract to run that route for several years.

== Regional trains ==
Regional trains connect Frankfurt with towns and villages up to a distance of 80 km (50 mi) away. Most regional trains stop at more than one station in Frankfurt and they also can be used for journeys within the city. Categories for local trains in Germany are Regionalbahn (RB) and Regional-Express (RE).

== Ferry ==
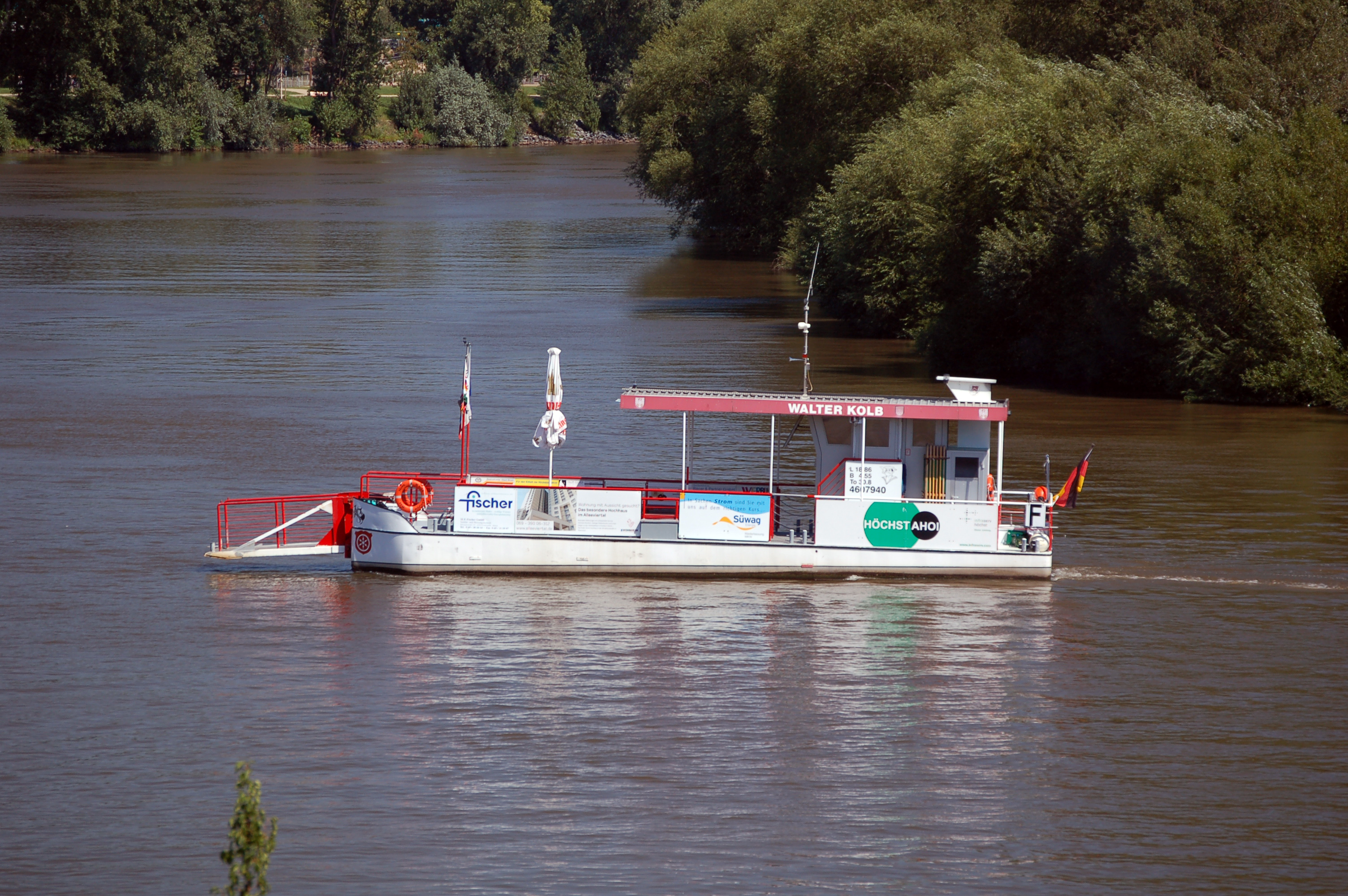
Ferry in Höchst

There is only one ferry line in Frankfurt, crossing the river Main between the districts of Höchst and Schwanheim. It runs between Frankfurt-Höchst Batterie and Frankfurt-Schwanheim Höchster Weg.

== Organisational structure ==
- The fare structure and distribution between the operators is organised by the Rhein-Main-Verkehrsverbund.
- The S-Bahn is run by Deutsche Bahn, the national German railroad operator.
- Light rail and trams are run by the city owned Frankfurt Transit Company (Verkehrsgesellschaft Frankfurt) (abbreviated: VGF).
- Buses are run by Verkehrsgesellschaft Frankfurt, In Der City Bus, MainMobil Frankfurt, Alpina and Regionalverkehr Kurhessen.

== Connections to long distance transport ==
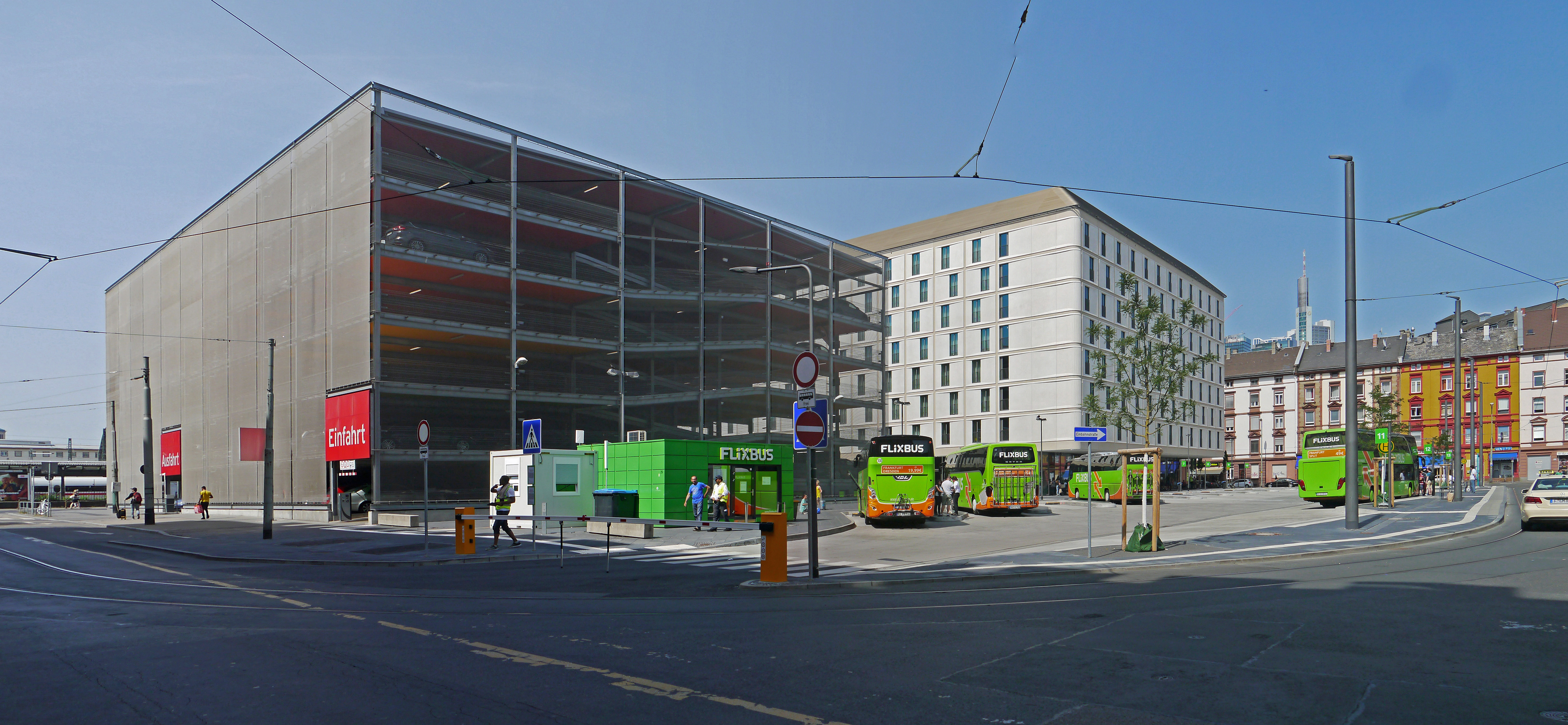
Fernbusbahnhof Frankfurt am Main

- Long distance trains stop at Frankfurt Central station, Frankfurt South station and Frankfurt Airport long-distance station.
- Long distance busses stop at Fernbusbahnhof Frankfurt am Main (long distance bus terminal) as well as a bus station at Airport Terminal 2
- Frankfurt Airport can be reached by S-Bahn lines S8 and S9 (at Frankfurt Airport regional station) as well as bus line 58 (Frankfurt-Höchst station - Airport Terminal 2)

== See also ==
- Rhein-Main-Verkehrsverbund
- Rhine-Main S-Bahn
- Frankfurt U-Bahn
- Trams in Frankfurt am Main
