= U-Bahn Line C (Frankfurt U-Bahn) =

Light rail line in Frankfurt, Germany

U6

Overview
- Stations: 12

Service
- Services: 04:22 AM – 00:42 AM; Every 7 min. (RH); Every 8/10 min. (MD); Every 20 min. (N)
- Operator: Verkehrsgesellschaft Frankfurt
- Rolling stock: U5-Triebwagen

History
- Opened: 11 October 1986

U7

Overview
- Stations: 23

Service
- Services: 04:15 AM – 00:55 AM; Every 7/8 min. (RH); Every 10 min. (MD); Every 20 min. (N)
- Operator: Verkehrsgesellschaft Frankfurt
- Rolling stock: U5-Triebwagen

History
- Opened: 11 October 1986

The C Line is the third line of the Frankfurt U-Bahn. It opened on 11 October 1986 and runs east-west through the city centre via Hauptwache and Konstablerwache. In the East it has branches to Frankfurt Ost railway station and Enkheim. To the North-west of the city centre it runs under Bockenheimer Landstraße before splitting into two branches to Hausen and Praunheim. The main services on the line are the U6 (Hausen-Frankfurt Ost) and U7 (Praunheim-Enkheim). Part of the branch to Enkheim also carries U4 services.

== Sections ==
Line C consists of various sections, most of which are identified with roman numerals:

| Rapid Transit | C I | Hauptwache – Alte Oper | U6, U7 |
| Rapid Transit | C II | Zoo – Hauptwache | U6, U7 |
| Rapid Transit | C III | Alte Oper – Bockenheimer Warte | U6, U7 |
| Rapid Transit | C V | Bockenheimer Warte – Industriehof | U6, U7 |
| Tram | | Industriehof– Hausen | U6 |
| Tram | | Industriehof– Heerstraße | U7 |
| Rapid Transit | C IVa | Zoo – Frankfurt Ost station | U6 |
| Tram | C 1 | Zoo – Enkheim | U7, Schäfflestraße to Enkheim also U4 |

=== Zoo - Bockenheimer Warte ===
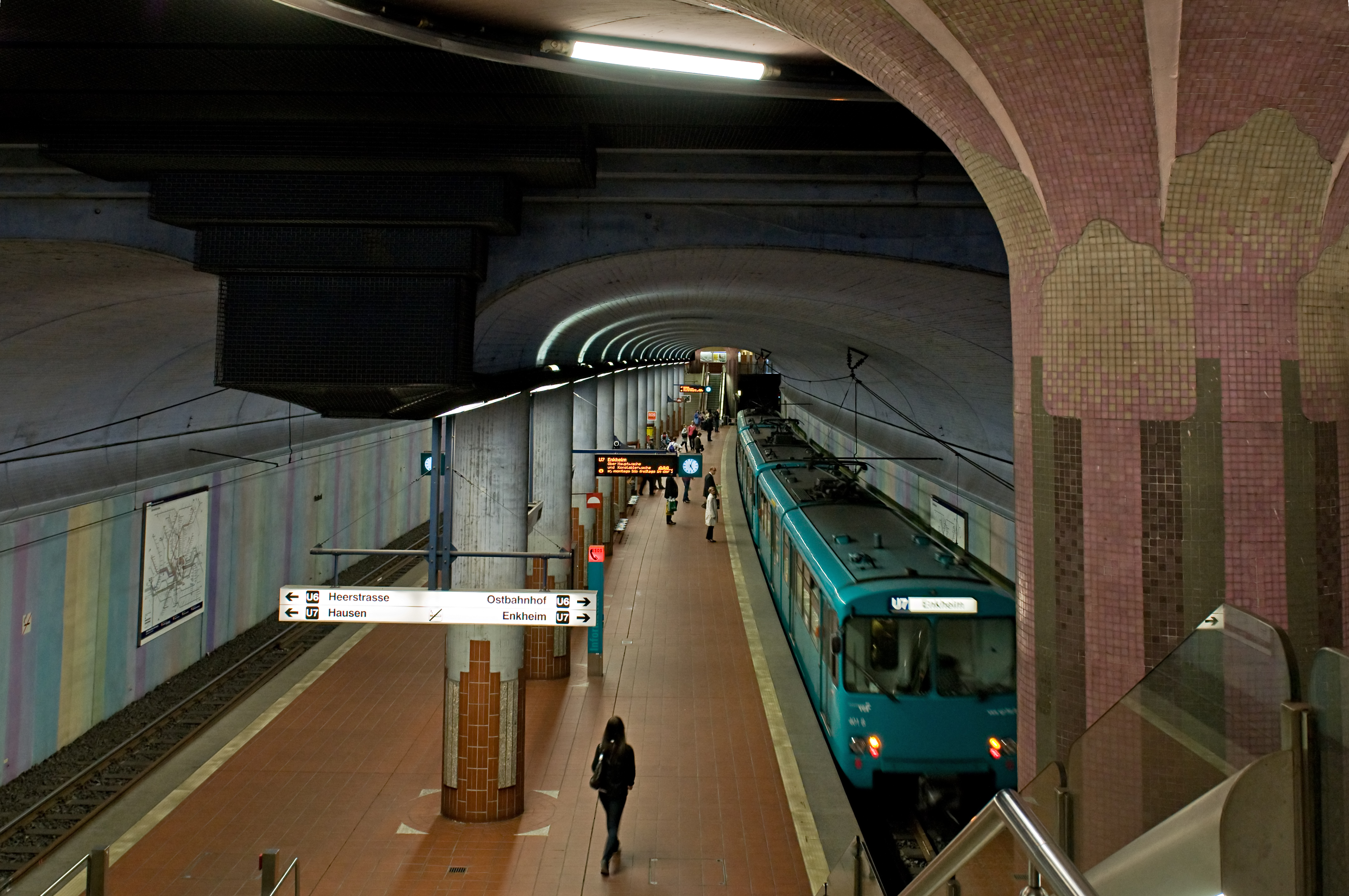
Westend station

The shared section of the line runs entirely underground from Zoo to Industriehof. Construction started in 1980 and the line opened in 1986.

The three-track underground Zoo station in Ostend is located under the Alfred-Brehm-Platz in front of the Frankfurt Zoo. When the C Line first opened Zoo was the eastern terminus for all services. The platform hall is decorated with numerous animal motifs. The northern two tracks are used by trains running into the city from each of the two eastern branches, with an island platform between them. Meanwhile, the southern track is used by all trains heading west.

The next station, at Konstablerwache has connections to the S-Bahn, with two island platforms allowing cross-platform interchange between the Rhine-Main S-Bahn and the C Line. There are also separate platforms for the U-Bahn B Line.

From Konstablerwache the C Line follows the S-Bahn City Tunnel under the Zeil to Hauptwache station. The upper level of the station has four tracks with an island platform between the two inner tracks for the S-Bahn and two side platform for the C Line on the two outer tracks. Below this there are also platforms for the U-Bahn A Line.

The line then reaches Alte Oper station, situated under Opernplatz, before following Bockenheimer Landstraße through Westend-Süd to the station of Westend. The station, designed by A.C. Walter, is characterised by floral elements due to the proximity to the Palmengarten botanical gardens. The next station, Bockenheimer Warte, is located below the square of the same name. The station serves the Bockenheim campus of Frankfurt University and on the walls are photos from the everyday life of the university in the 1980s. Since 2001 station the station has been an interchange with the U-Bahn D Line and there is a single-track tunnel linking the C and D lines south of the station. This is the only underground connection between two different lines in Frankfurt. Via the western exit, a tram stop, served by line 16, can be reached, located in front of the former Bockenheimer Depot.

=== Bockenheimer Warte - Industriehof ===
The line was originally intended to leave the tunnel via a ramp in Adalbertstraße, but after protests about trains running on Leipziger Straße the plans were changed and the tunnel continues under the street. Construction of Leipziger Straße station began in 1982 and due to the narrow width of the street the platforms are located one above the other, not side by side. The station is decorated with pictures of older underground railway systems such as Paris or London.

The C Line tunnel then leaves the route of Leipziger Straße and continues north-west to the station Kirchplatz, where the route crosses Ginnheimer Landstraße. The station is named after the Protestant Jakobskirche next to it. In addition to ecclesiastical motifs the decoration in the station includes old pictures of the formerly independent city of Bockenheim. Kirchplatz is the final underground station on the route. After crossing under the Main–Weser Railway the tunnel ends with a ramp up to Industriehof station, in the central reservation of Friedrich-Wilhelm-von-Steuben-Straße. South of the station there is a connection to the tram tracks running over Breitenbachbrücke, which are not used in passenger service. North of the station the two branches to Hausen and Praunheim diverge.

=== Industriehof - Heerstraße ===
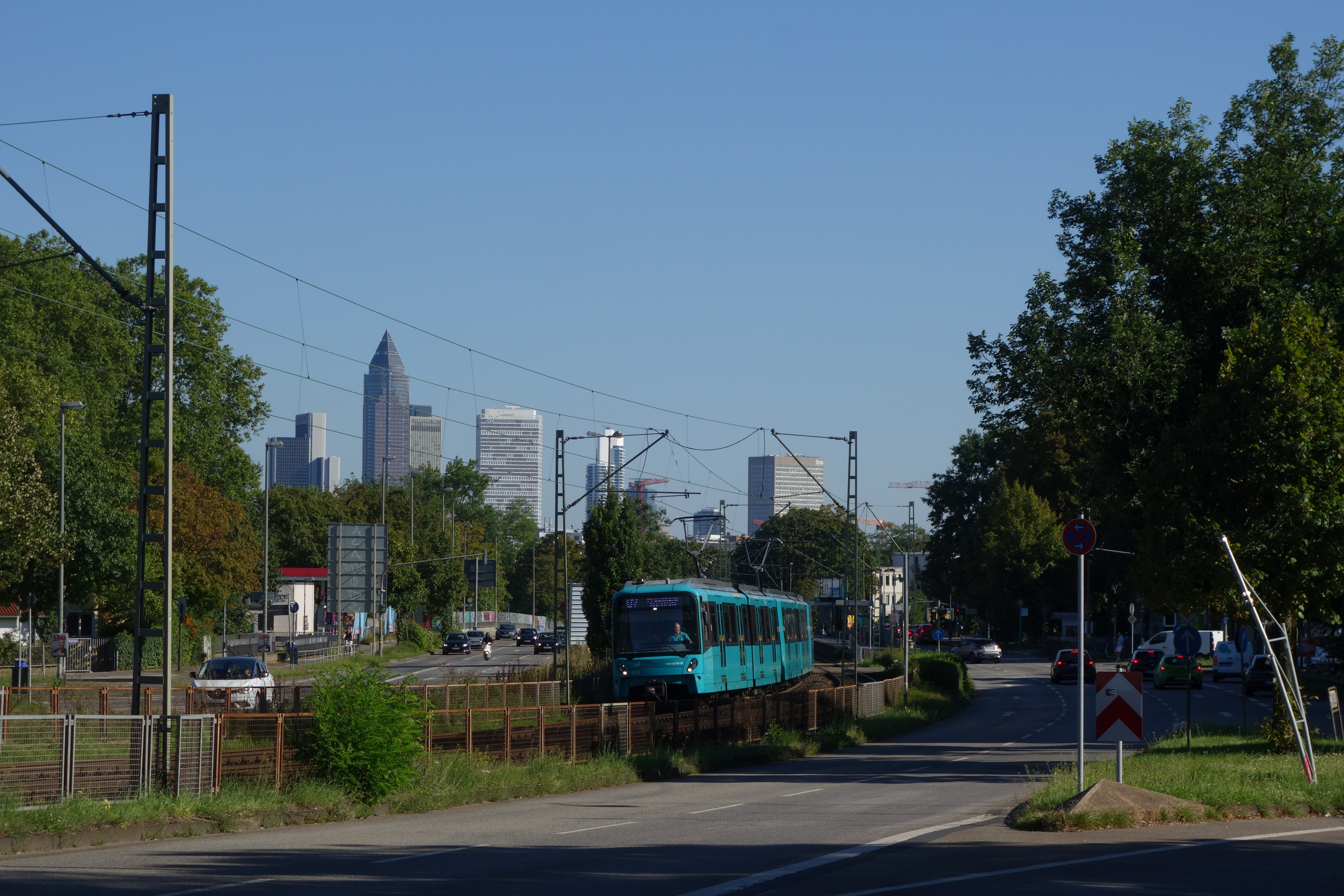
U7 train on Ludwig-Landmann-Straße in Rödelheim

The longer of the two north-western branches of the line runs in the central reservation of the mostly two-lane Ludwig-Landmann-Straße. This branch was originally used by the U6, but since December 2018 has been part of the U7 service.

Until the start of services through the C Line in 1986 this route was used by tram line 22. The tram line had already been upgraded to light rail standards in the 1970s in connection with the construction of the new Central Workshop. For the opening of the C Line the only conversion measures required were extending the existing low platforms to a uniform length of 90 m. A further upgrade took place only in recent years, the route was thereby equipped with higher barrier-free platforms, level with the train floor. Due to its use to access the Central Workshop very varied traffic is commonplace on this branch, from light rail vehicles of all series to low-floor tram vehicles, work cars and old museum vehicles.

From Industriehof the line passes through the station at Fischstein and crosses the river Nidda before reaching Hausener Weg. This station lies at the junction of the street of the same name with Ludwig-Landmann-Straße and serves the adjacent residential areas of Hausen and Rödelheim. It was the first stop to be rebuilt according to barrier-free guidelines. The former low-level platforms were replaced by elevated platforms and traffic-light controlled pedestrian crossings were built to replace the underpasses to access the platforms.

The line then passes over the A 66 motorway and continues along Ludwig-Landmann-Straße with stations at Stephan-Heise-Straße and Friedhof Westhausen (Westhausen cemetery). Both stations are very similar with high platforms accessed via both a ground-level pedestrian crossing and an underpass.

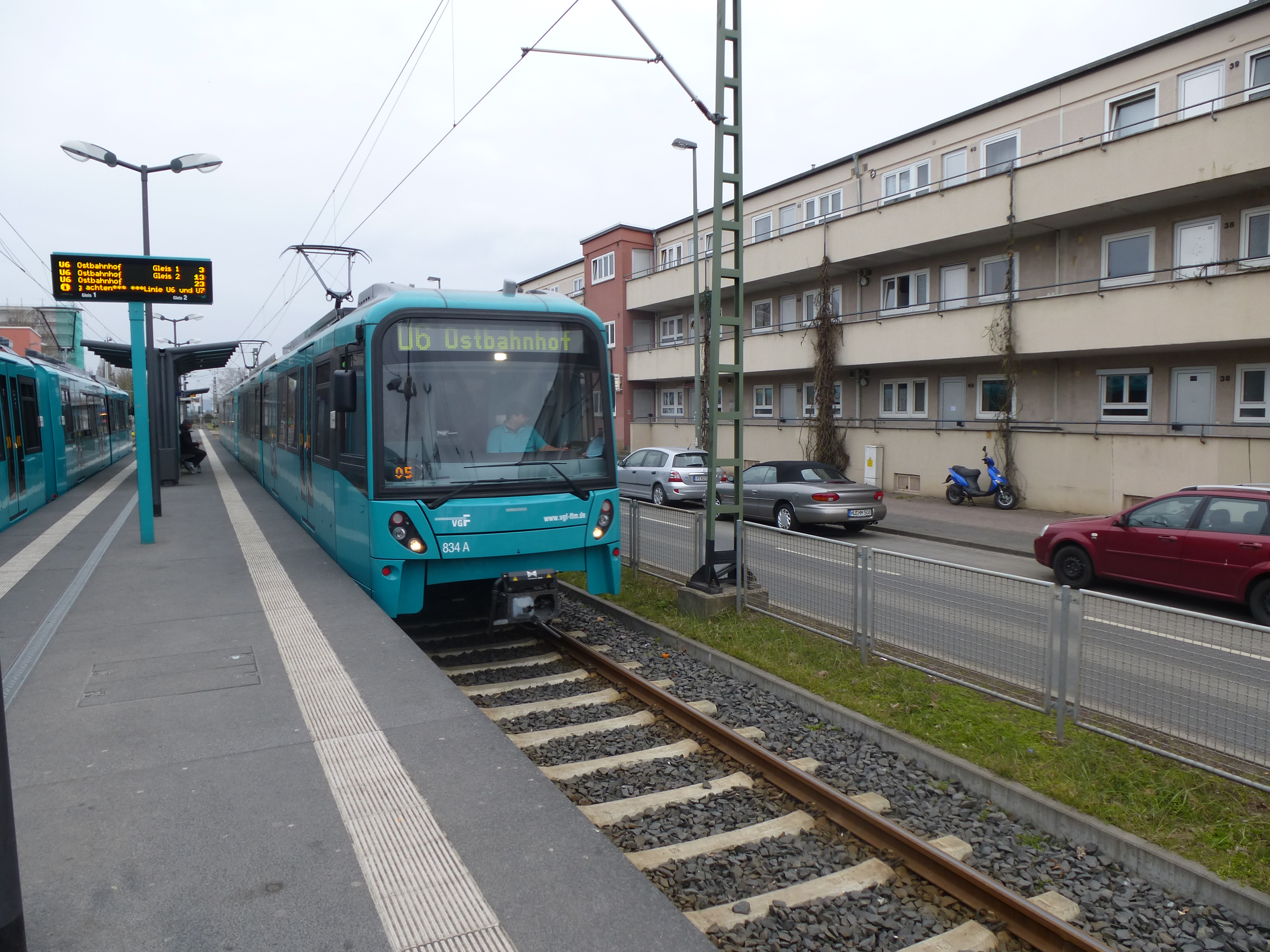
U6 train at Heerstraße

The next station, Heerstraße, is the end of the line. The station was previously further north, but move when it was rebuilt with a high island platform in 2004. At the same time the neighbouring station to the south, Ebelfeld, was closed. Heerstraße station serves the 1920s housing estate of Praunheim. The tracks continue around 1 km (0.62 mi) past the station to reach the Central Workshop. An extension of this branch is planned to a new station in Praunheim industrial estate (Gewerbegebiet Praunheim), connecting with the planned Regionaltangente West line.

=== Industriehof - Hausen ===
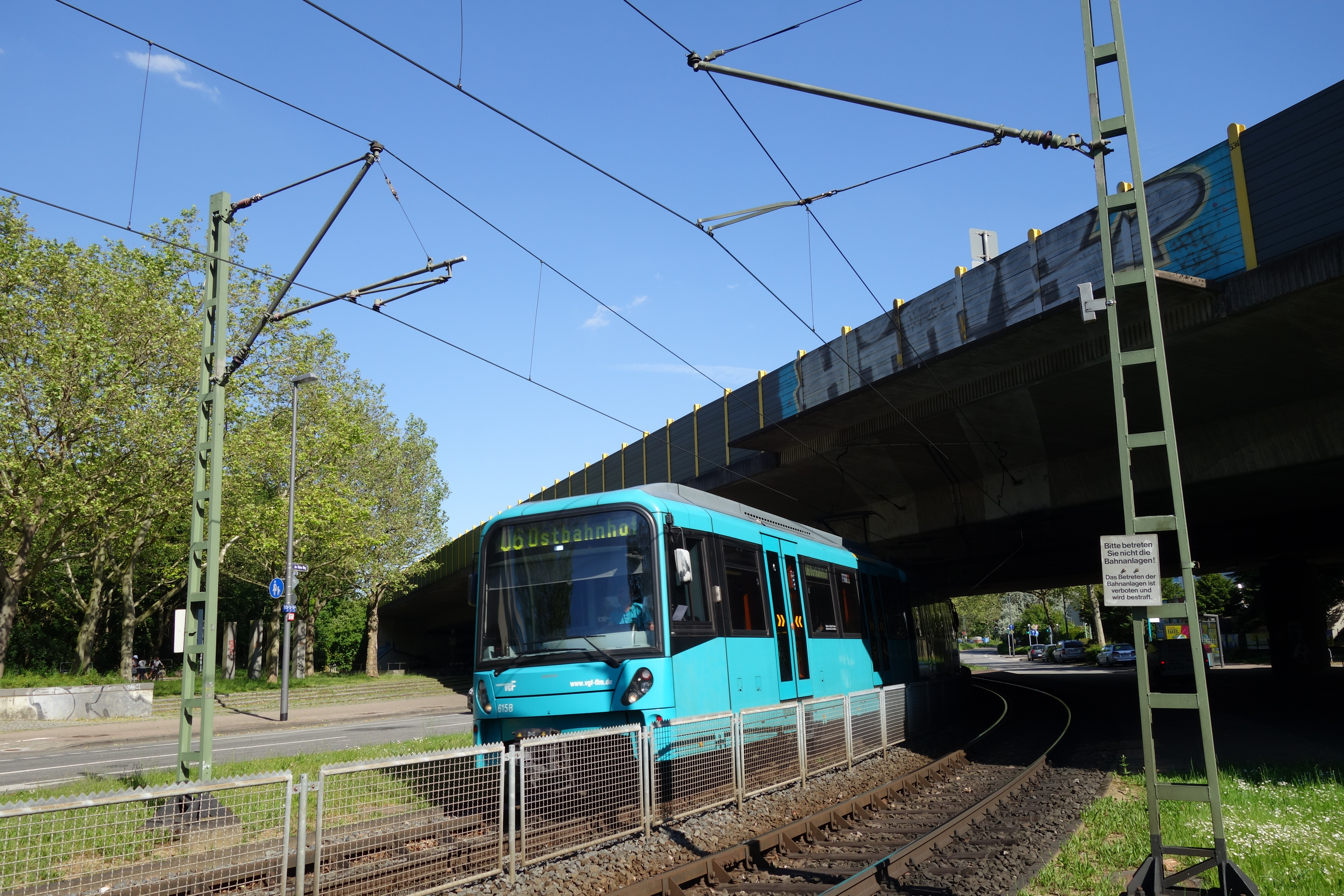
U5 class car as line U6 underneath Bundesautobahn 66 close to final station Hausen.

The branch to Hausen (now served by the U6, formerly the U7) runs at ground level on the central reservation of Am Hohen Weg. Like the route to Heerstraße it was upgraded to light rail standards during the 1970s. The only intermediate stop is Große Nelkenstraße, which serves the centre of Hausen and has two side platforms staggered either side of the junction with Große Nelkenstraße itself.

The line then passes under the A 66 motorway and runs along Praunheimer Landstraße to the terminus at Hausen which is located at the beginning of Praunheimer Landstraße in the Willi Brundert housing estate.

The former tram line 18 continued from Hausen on a partly single-track route to Praunheim Brücke. The original plans had been for this section to also be upgraded, but instead it was closed in 1985 before the U-Bahn began operation.

=== Zoo - Ostbahnhof ===
The route to Ostbahnhof, opened on 31 May 1999, is the shortest branch of the Frankfurt U-Bahn, at only about 750 metres. Two tunnels connect to the two outer tracks from Zoo station. The northern track coming from Ostbahnhof crosses below the tunnel of the branch to Enkheim in a grade-separated junction. The route then runs under the zoo grounds and then bends to the right to reach Ostbahnhof. The U-Bahn station is at the southeastern end of the railway station. Opened in 1999, this section is the latest addition to the C route and offers connections to regional trains.

The outer walls of the underground station are decorated with large black and white photographs of the river Main and its bridges from the 19th to the 21st century. The central platform has direct daylight through the glass roof of the central access building on Danziger Platz in front of the railway station building. The station was only accessible from Danziger Platz for eight years until the platforms were extended and an additional entrance built on Hanauer Landstraße, located south of the Ostbahnhof. Tram line 11 also received an additional stop there to allow a better transfer.

=== Zoo - Enkheim ===
The branch to Enkheim opened on 31 May 1992. From Zoo station the line runs in a tunnel under the zoo and along the course of Rhönstraße through Ostend. Habsburgerallee station is located between the junctions of Rhönstraße with Waldschmidtstraße and Habsburgerallee. Like the following two stations, this one is very simple compared to the stations in Bockenheim and Westend. Dominant design elements are the octagonal pillars, which the ceiling lights and floor coverings are directed towards. The colour of the pillars and the motifs on the outer walls are the biggest differences in the three stations of the Ostend line. In Habsburgerallee station the columns are green and on the wall there is a mosaic with donkeys by the artist Manfred Stumpf.

The following underground station, Parlamentsplatz, is located at the end of the Rhönstraße below a densely built-up square. The columns of this station are yellow and the wall motifs show black-and-white images of people communicating.

The last underground station of the Ostend line is Eissporthalle, which lies below the Bornheimer Hang housing estate. One entrance is on the Ratsweg, another leads directly to the fairground in front of the Eissporthalle ice rink. The station architecture in this case has blue columns and wintry photographs on wine-red walls.

The C Line leaves its tunnel at a ramp between the ice rink and the stadium on Bornheimer Hang. The first above-ground station is Johanna-Tesch-Platz, next to the Am Erlenbruch road. From here the line runs along a former tram route (previously used by lines 12, 18, 20 and 23). The route was converted for the U-Bahn in 1992 with high platforms, enlarged curve radii and reduced crossings and remaining crossings equipped with traffic lights. The line follows Am Erlenbruch past a connection to the East Depot, where U4 services from the B Line join the route, through Schäfflestraße then turns left onto Borsigallee and continues on the central reservation of this road with stations at Gwinnerstraße, Kruppstraße, Hessen-Center and Enkheim. At Gwinnerstraße there was a junction for tram line 20 (later 12) to Bergen, which was closed when the route was converted to U-Bahn. Kruppstraße station is located about 100 m from the end of the eastern section of the A 66 motorway and has a large park and ride car park. The station at Hessen-Center serves the shopping of the same name. The terminus Enkheim offers connections to bus services with a two-lane one-way bus lane located between the two outer platforms.

== Gallery ==
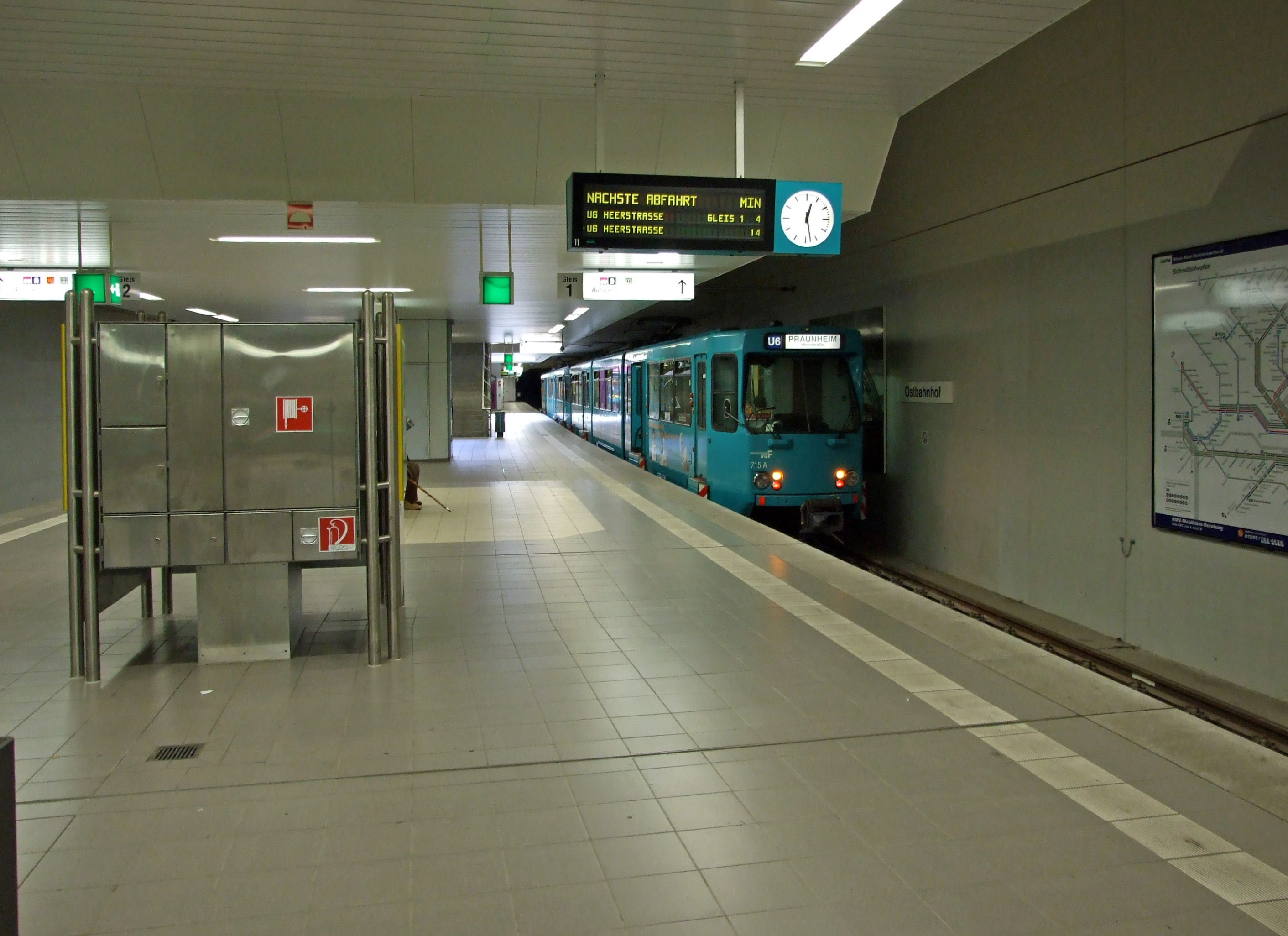
U6 terminus at Ostbahnhof

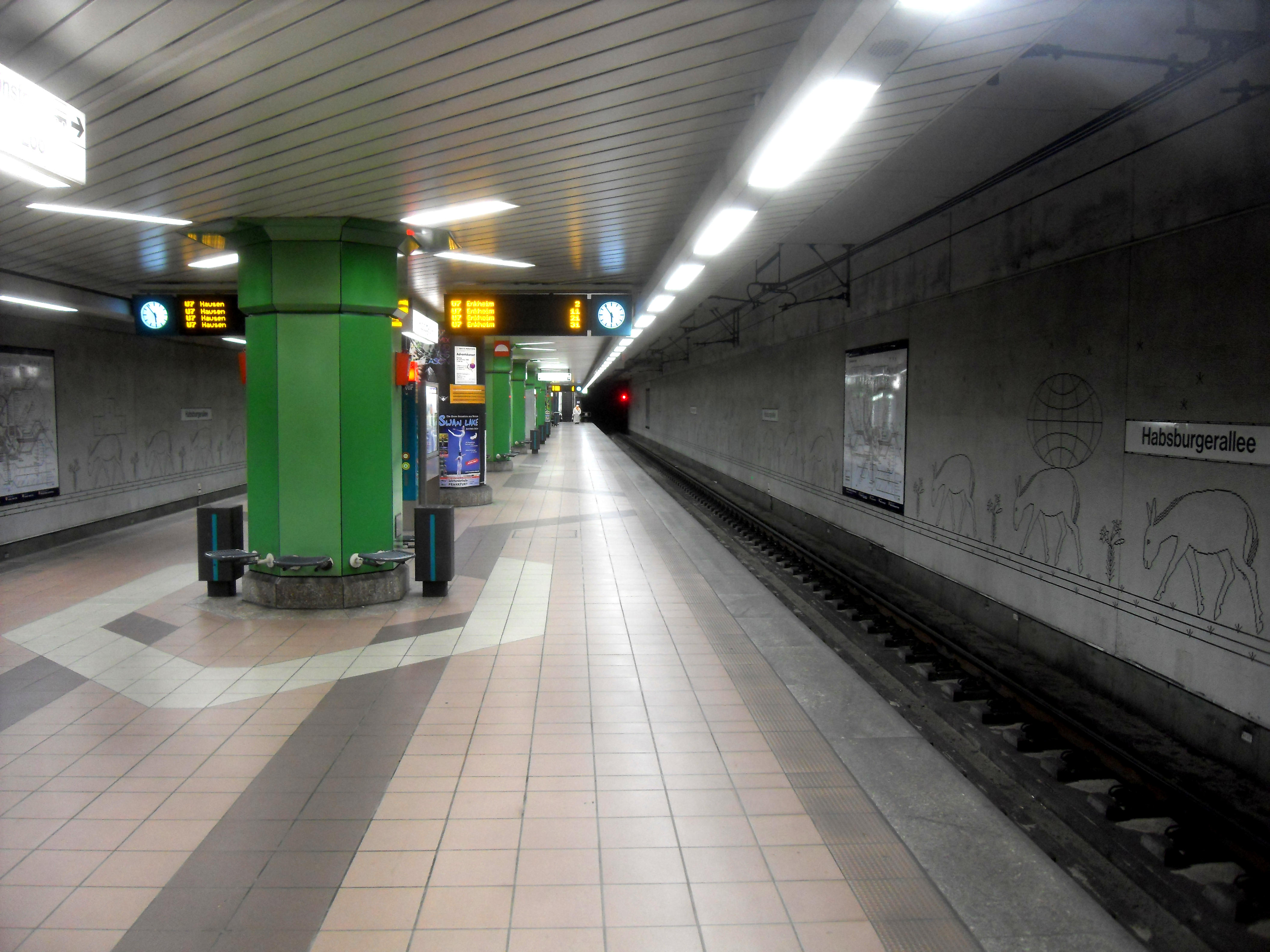
Habsburgerallee station

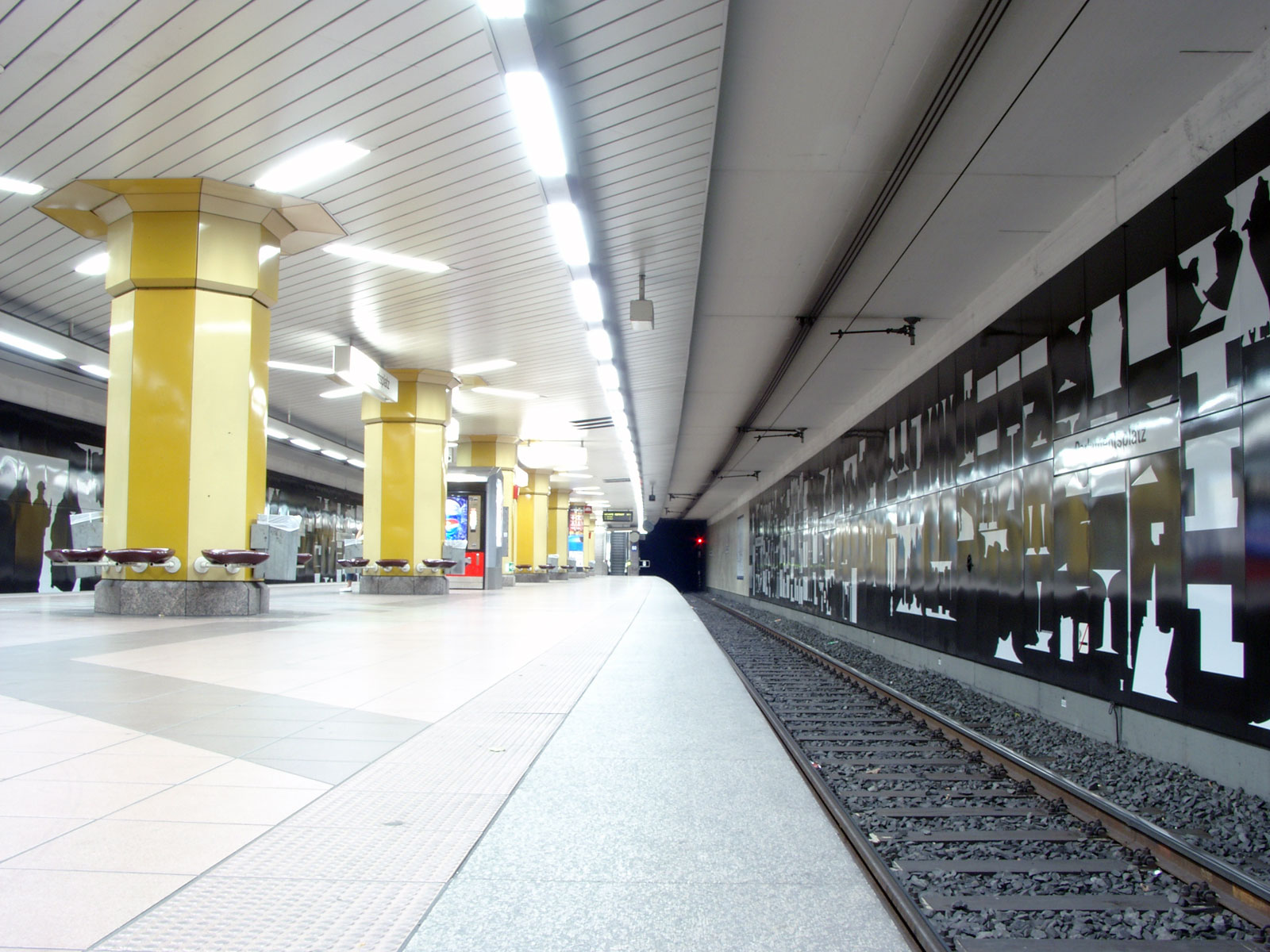
Parlamentsplatz station

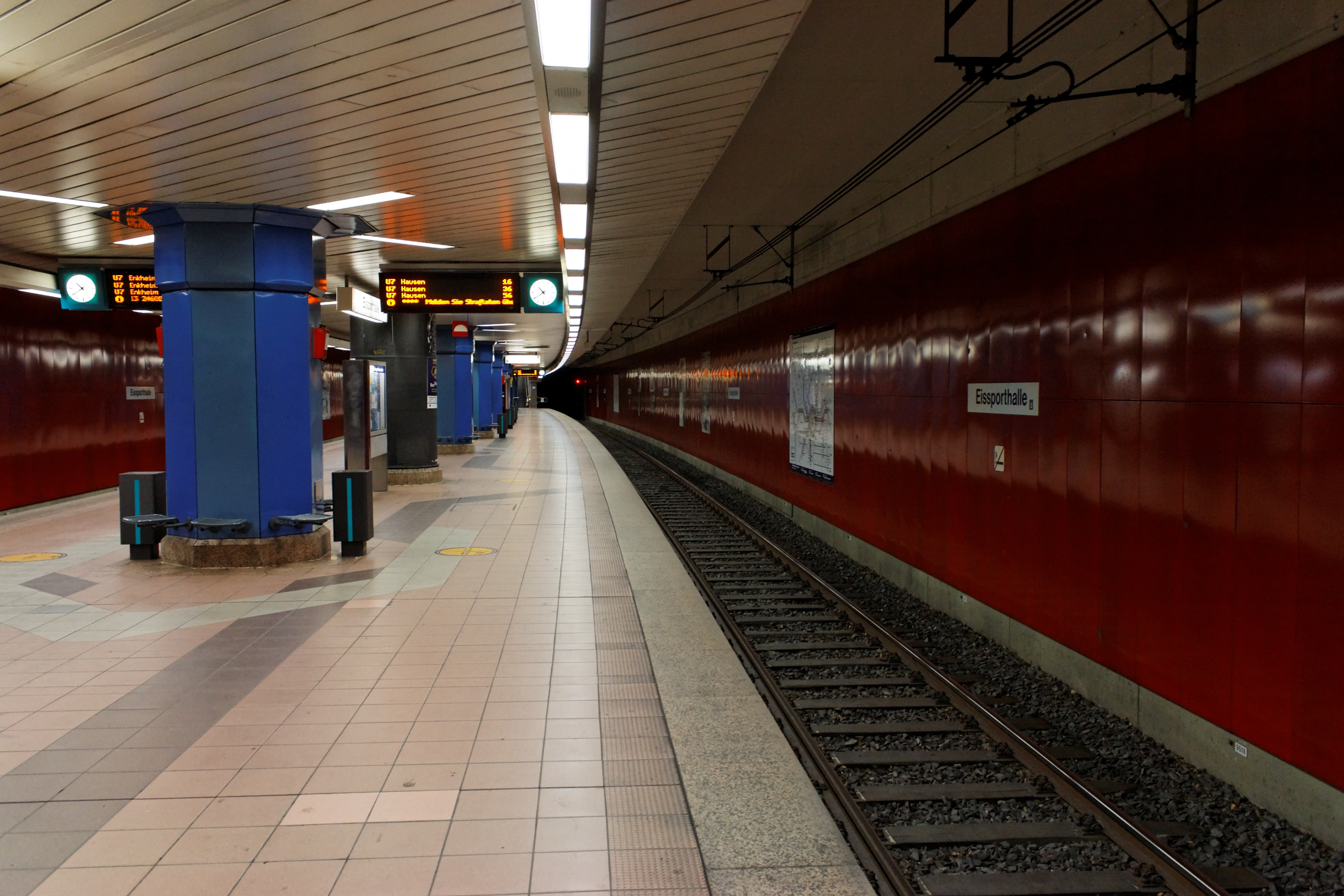
Eissporthalle station

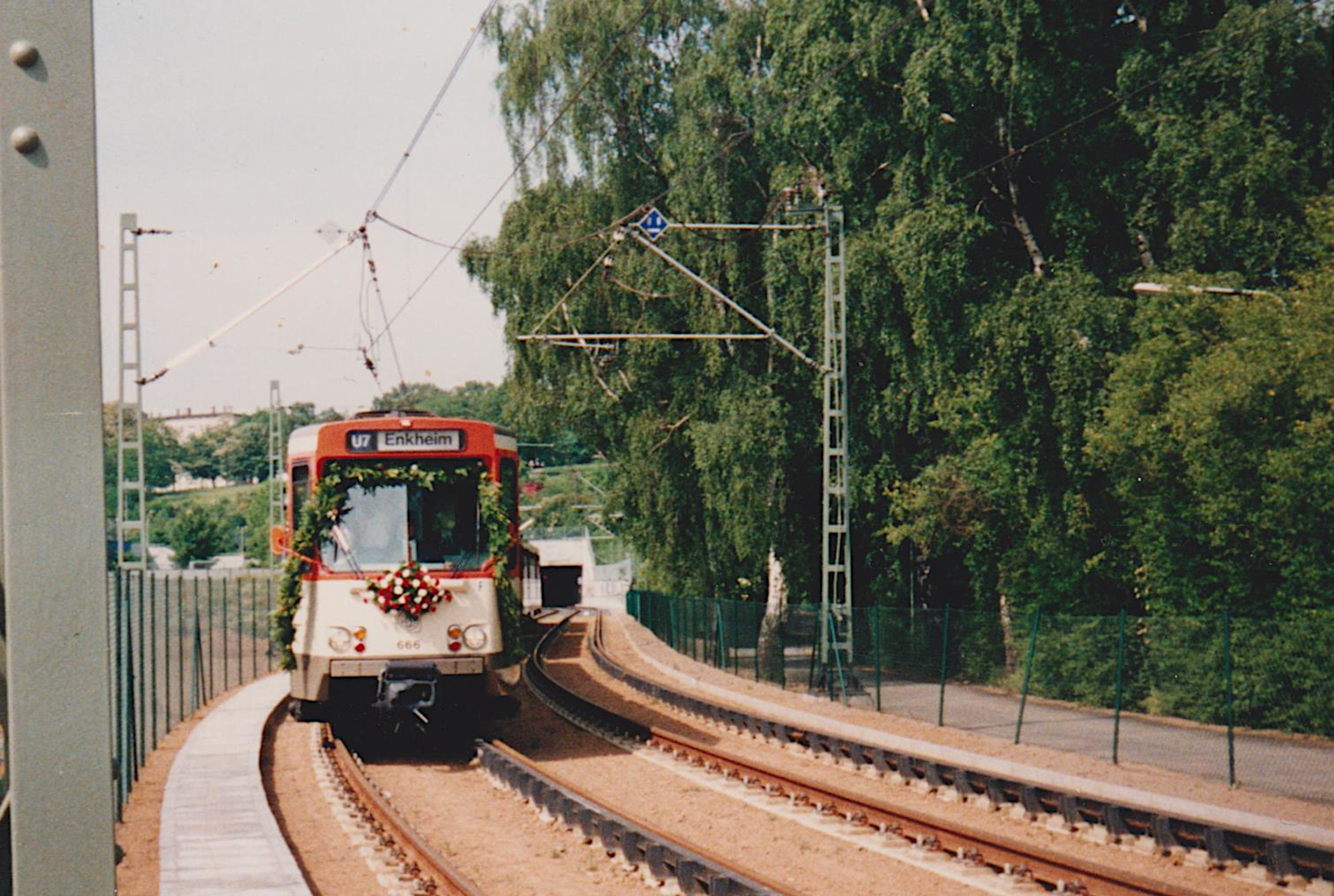
Inaugural train of the U7 to Enkheim on 30 May 1992

== Future Plans ==
Currently there are plans to extend the branch of the U6 from the Ostbahnhof along the Hanauer Landstraße to the Ratswegkreisel. Subsequently, the district of Fechenheim is to be reached on the current tram line in central position of the Hanauer highway. The planning is in some competition with the construction of the North-Main S-Bahn line to Hanau, because instead of the S-Bahn also an extension of the U6 to Hanau is possible. Since the city has decided in favor of the North-Main S-Bahn line, the construction is unlikely.

A short extension of the urban railway line in the district of Bergen-Enkheim along the street lamp to the mountain pool Bergen is currently not pursued. The reasons are the immediately adjacent nature reserve and the unclear development of the building area lamp.

At the western end of the U6, plans were made in the 1980s to extend the route to Steinbach or even further to Kronberg-Oberhöchstadt. To Steinbach this could be used for an originally planned city highway kept track including underpass under the A 5, a former gas station of the American Army on the highway could be converted into a park-and-ride place. The project was included in the General Transportation Plan in 2005, but there is no concrete timetable for the construction.

After the decision of the Roman coalition of 9 June 2017 to build a new district along the A5 motorway between Praunheim and Niederursel and Steinbach in the west, the extension of the U6 underground line over the current terminal Heerstraße out in the direction of Steinbach again discussed.

Also since 2005, a reactivation of the former tram line to Bergen in the general traffic plan is provided, which is to be supplemented by a short tunnel in the old town of Berger.

In early 2013, the Frankfurt Department of Transportation had a possible extension of the subway line 6 to Eschborn check. The Frankfurt Department of Transportation commissioned a correspondingly concrete study of the project, which concerned the extension of subway line 6, which currently ends at Heerstraße in Praunheim. A stop in the industrial park Helfmann-Park was considered possible. According to the mayor of Eschborn, this would "further enhance the Eschborn location". The Greens in the high Taunuskreis also advocated for an expansion of the U6 beyond Eschborn with stops in Steinbach and Kronberg, since the city of Oberursel in the high Taunuskreis long ago via the subway line 3 was connected to the Frankfurt subway network is. In March 2014, however, the city council of Frankfurt decided against the further expansion of the U6 in the Taunus, as the estimated costs of around 30 million euros were considered not "portable".

Many commuters who work on weekdays mainly from the direction of Frankfurt in the offices of the business park at Helfmann Park in Eschborn resident companies, now remains only the hope of the Regional Tangent West. The planning of the Regional Tangent West provides for a total of three new stops for the industrial estate in the southeast of Eschborn.
