= Bornheim (Frankfurt am Main) =

- Quarter of Frankfurt am Main
- Coat of arms

- Location of Bornheim (red) and the Ortsbezirk Bornheim/Ostend (light red) within Frankfurt am Main
- Interactive map of Bornheim
- Location within Germany Location within Hesse
- Coordinates: 50°07′43″N 08°42′42″E
- Country: Germany
- State: Hesse
- Admin. region: Darmstadt
- District: Urban district
- City: Frankfurt am Main

Area
  - Total: 2.78 km^{2} (1.07 sq mi)

Population (2020-12-31)
  - Total: 30,761
  - Density: 11,100/km^{2} (28,700/sq mi)
- Time zone: UTC+01:00 (CET)
  - Summer (DST): UTC+02:00 (CEST)
- Postal codes: 60385, 60386, 60389
- Dialling codes: 069
- Vehicle registration: F

Bornheim (German pronunciation: [ˈbɔʁnhaɪm]) is a quarter of Frankfurt am Main, Germany. It is part of the Ortsbezirk Bornheim/Ostend.

In the past, Bornheim was called Das lustige Dorf ("The merry village"), because it was the red-light district of Frankfurt up to some 120 years ago. It still retains some of its lively charm and is said to be the younger crowd's hangout, shared with Sachsenhausen. The main street of Bornheim is Berger Straße, a cosmopolitan boulevard with many bars, pubs and restaurants and two of Frankfurt's most traditional cider houses, Solzer and Zur Sonne. The Holy Cross Church with the Holy Cross – Centre for Christian Meditation and Spirituality of the Roman Catholic Diocese of Limburg, known for its modernist architecture, is located in Bornheim.

Two underground lines (U4 and U7) run through Bornheim.
