= U-Bahn Line B (Frankfurt U-Bahn) =

Light rail line in Frankfurt, Germany

The B Line is the second line in the network of the Frankfurt U-Bahn, running in a west–east direction from the central railway station (Hauptbahnhof) through the old town to Konstablerwache, where it splits into two branches to Bornheim (served by the U4) and Preungesheim (served by the U5).

== Route ==
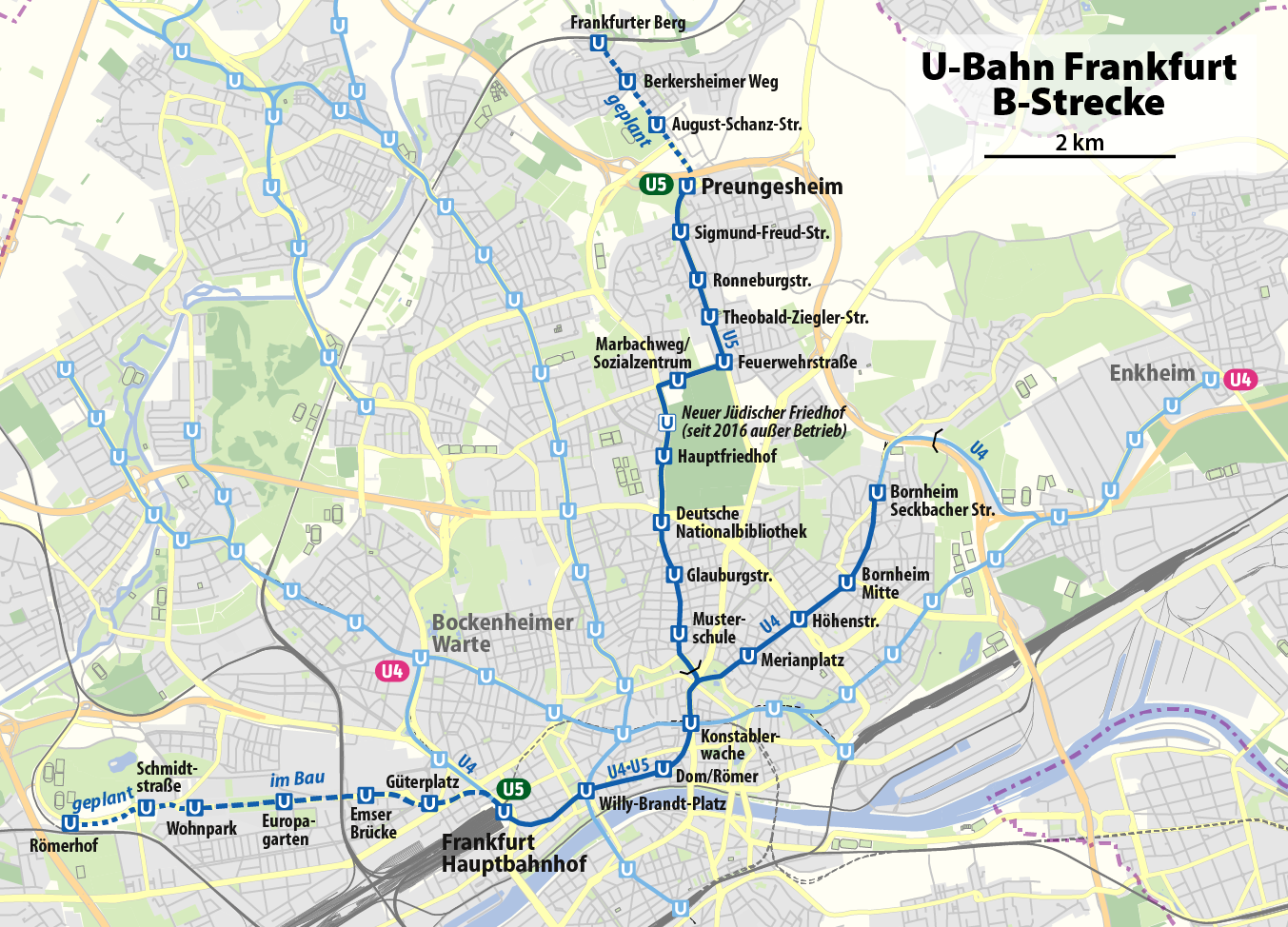
Map of the B Line.

The B line can be divided into three sections: the trunk line used by the U4 and U5 between the central railway station (Frankfurt Hauptbahnhof) and Konstablerwache and the two branches which the line splits into at its eastern end.

=== Konstablerwache - Hauptbahnhof ===
Below the subterranean shopping arcade under the station forecourt is the four-track underground station at Hauptbahnhof, which was built as a shared station for the B and D lines. It has two island platforms, which according to long-term planning are to be used for cross-platform interchange between the north–south D line and the east–west B line. At present, however, only the eastern branch of the B line and the northern branch of the D line exist. Since the commissioning of the D line extension of the U4 to Bockenheimer Warte, U4 trains to Bockenheim and terminating U5 trains use one of the inner tracks, starting U5 trains use the other inner track, and the outer western track is used by the U4 to Bornheim. The eastern outer track is intended for the unbuilt southbound D line and has never been put into service. The central station is the most important transport hub in the region and offers connections to S-Bahn trains (in an underground station below the U-Bahn), trams, city and regional buses, and regional and long-distance train services.

After leaving the southern end of the station the tunnel turns left to travel under Gutleutstraße to Willy-Brandt-Platz. In 1974 this station became the first transfer station of the Frankfurt U-Bahn, where the B Line crosses the A Line. The B Line station lies below that of the A Line and both lines have side platforms. The station is located in the Frankfurt financial district on New Mainzer Straße. The Eurotower of the European Central Bank did have a direct access, but the management of the ECB has let it close.

The route continues through the Altstadt, first under Weißfrauenstraße, then Münzgasse and Limpurgergasse to reach the Römerberg, the central square of the old town.The station, called Dom / Römer, lies deep below the oldest settlement in Frankfurt. It has a central platform and an intermediate level decorated with carved stones from nearby buildings destroyed by air raids in 1944. Probably the longest escalators of Frankfurt's rapid transit stations lead to the eastern exit at the foot of the western tower of Frankfurt Cathedral.

Beyond Dom / Römer station, the route runs under the cathedral square and Kannengießergasse to Fahrgasse, which it crosses before swinging in a wide arc under two blocks and the Dominican monastery in a northerly direction to follow the course of the Kurt-Schumacher-Straße and reach Konstablerwache. Below the pedestrianised square, there is a large underground rapid-transit railway station. In the second underground level there is a three-track station for the B line. Perpendicular to this and one level lower is a four-track station for the U-Bahn C Line and the S-Bahn. Trains on the B line use two tracks in the direction of the central railway station, because the branches from Bornheim (U4) and Preungesheim (U5) meet here, but in the opposite direction both services use the same track as the tunnel only splits after leaving the station.

=== Konstablerwache - Preungesheim ===
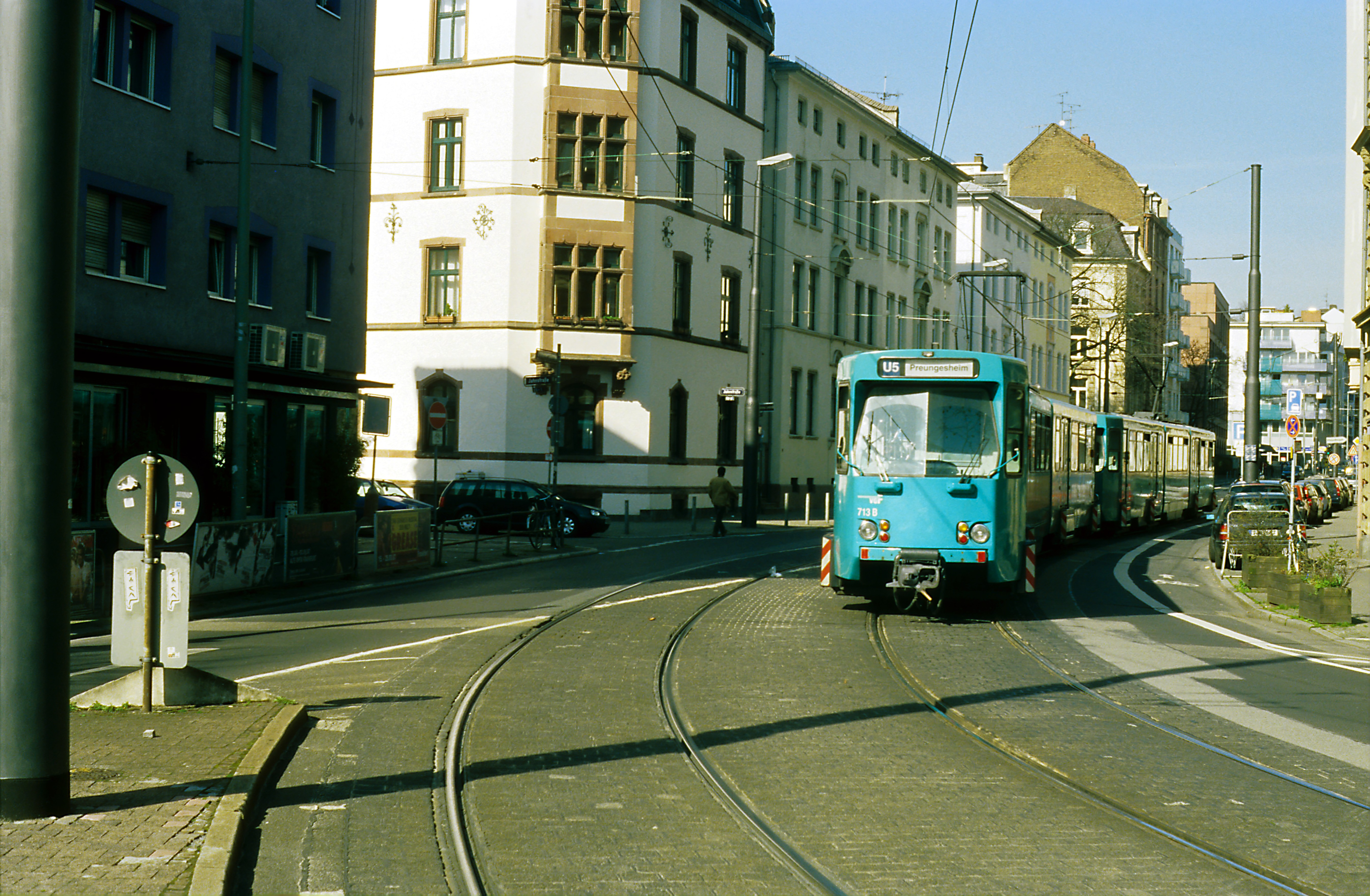
Type Ptb tram at the southern end of Eckenheimer Landstraße in 2007.

From Konstablerwache the branch to Preungesheim heads north under Konrad-Adenauer-Straße to the Friedberger Tor and then emerges from its tunnel in the Wallanlagen park. The Wallanlagen are actually protected from any development by the Wallservitut of 1827, so the route is a violation of the most famous Frankfurt building regulation. From the mouth of the tunnel the route has around 1200 m of on-street running along Eckenheimer Landstraße, shared with other traffic. This was originally intended as a temporary step in the conversion of this route from tram to U-Bahn operation.

From the junction with Oeder Weg, Eckenheimer Landstraße becomes wider and the route has reserved tracks in the central reservation. At Marbachweg the line turns east and then north into Gießener Straße. Between 1974 and 1978 the station at Gießener Straße was the northern terminus of the line, until the continuation north along Gießener Straße opened on 6 March 1978, replacing a tram line in the parallel Homburger Landstraße. Unlike this, today's route no longer runs directly to the center of Preungesheim, but to a residential area characterised by its 1950s buildings. By the station at Sigmund-Freud-Straße there are also 1960s residential skyscrapers. The three-track terminus at Preungesheim is located at the junction of Gießener road and Homburger Landstraße, just south of the A661 motorway bridge.

==== Barrier-free platforms ====
When the Preungesheim branch originally opened the stations had low-level platforms or access from street level. From 2013 to 2016, high-level platforms were built at the above-ground stations to allow barrier-free access to the trains. In addition to the dismantling of the existing platforms and the construction of the new side platforms the renovation work included adjustments to the tracks and overhead lines and adjustments to the road and traffic management, the cycle paths, and traffic lights, which will give priority to U-Bahn trains along the route. The stations at Neuer Jüdischer Friedhof and Eckenheimer Landstraße / Marbachweg were taken out of service instead of being rebuilt. Eckenheimer Landstraße / Marbachweg will not be rebuilt because it is only around 70 m away from the station at Marbachweg / Sozialzentrum. The reconstruction of Neuer Jüdischer Friedhof was planned to take place from 2018.

==== Intersection ====
At the intersection, Eckenheimer Landstraße - Glauburgstraße branches off an operating route to the east. It is the remainder of the former route Eschenheimer Tor - Oeder way - Glauburgstrasse - Nordend, which was used until 1963 by the route 12, one of the main services of the Frankfurt tram network. With the beginning of the underground construction work, the route was shut down by the Oeder way and the tram service 12 moved into the Friedberger highway. The remaining stretch of the route from Eckenheimer Landstrasse to Friedberger Landstraße served as the main access road for all lines in the Eckenheim depot except the 13 and the 22, which were fed via the Marbachweg. In the rush hour this route was additionally used until the 1980s by the tram line 25 (formerly 5). It operated from Eckenheim on the Glauburgstraße to Bornheim and on to Fechenheim. Today, the route is for operational purposes only. After expanding the course towards the city center in 2002, it is only passable from and to the north. The route leads east to the intersection Friedberger Landstraße / Rohrbachstraße, where it joined in both directions to the route of the tram service 12. In the course of the expansion of the new tram service 18 to Preungesheim in 2010, the direct connection Eckenheim–Bornheim was capped and the route closes in the intersection Friedberger highway / Glauburgstraße / Rohrbachstraße only in the direction of the city center.

At the crossroads Marbachweg / Eckenheimer Landstraße branches off two further distances: from here to the north a twin-track operating line leads to the former, today only as Wagenhalle used operating yard corner home. This route used to be run by the HVZ Line 5, which was later renamed 25, as well as some sections of the timetable from lines 19 and 27.

Towards the west, the single-track section of the former tram services 13 and 22 leads over the Marbachweg to the Eschersheimer Landstraße, where it connects at the Dornbusch station to the A-line, which is also at street level. This route continued from 1963 to 1978 through the Hansaallee and the Reuterweg to the Opernplatz. That too will no longer be on scheduled service today.

=== Konstablerwache - Bornheim ===
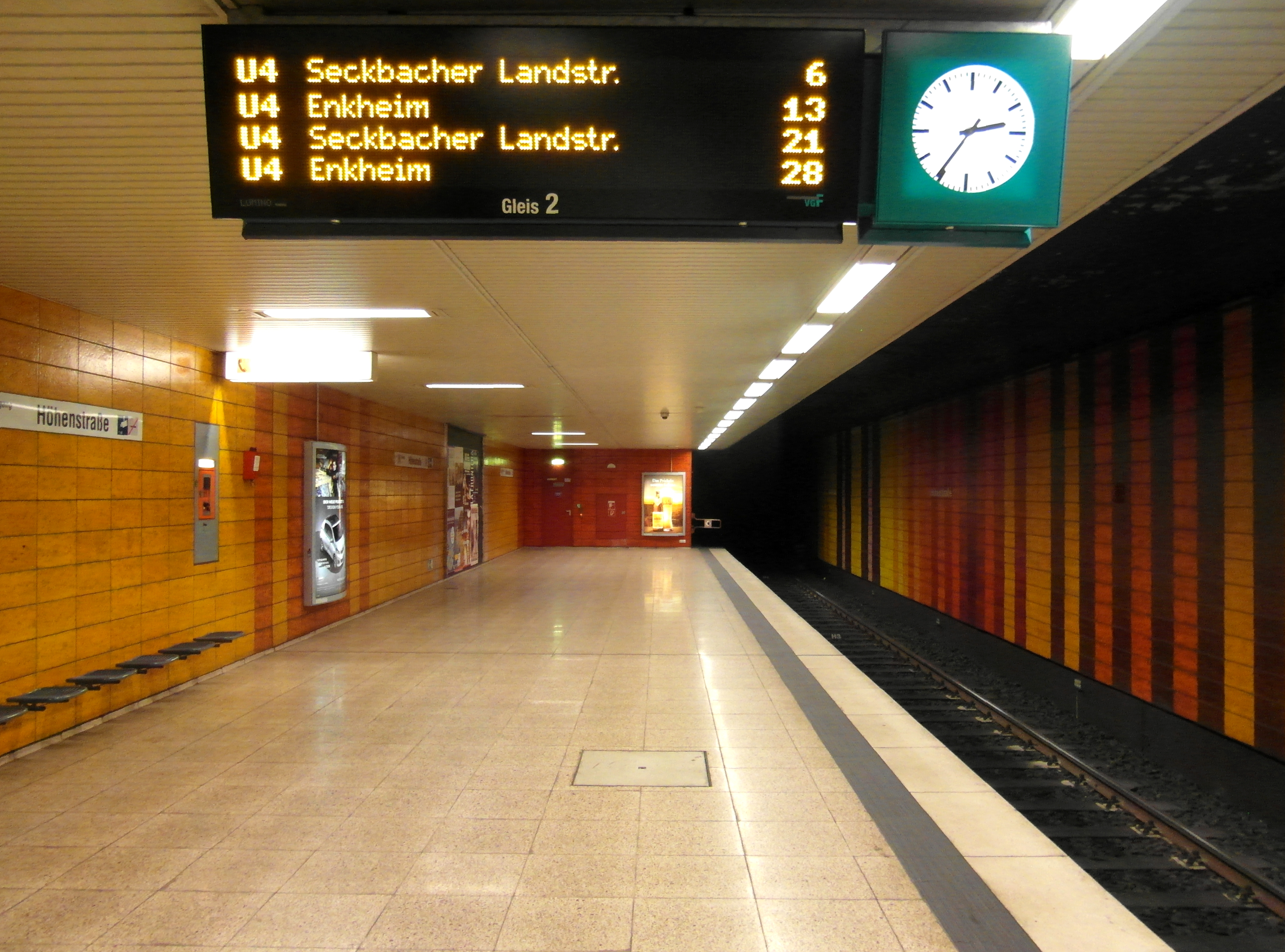
Eastbound platform at Höhenstraße

The route from the Konstablerwache to Bornheim belongs to a second phase of construction and opened on 31 May 1980. The tunnel begins by follows Berger Straße through Nordend to Bornheim. Due to the narrow width of Berger Straße the tunnels for the two tracks were not built side by side, but one above the other and the stations at Merianplatz, Höhenstraße and Bornheim-Mitte have two single-track platforms on different levels. All three stations are simply designed with ceramic wall tiles in warm, bold colours. The station at Bornheim Mitte, located where Berger Straße crosses Saalburgstraße, is the most important public transport node in the district and provides connections to trams in Frankfurt am Main and buses.

After leaving Bornheim Mitte the tunnel leaves Berger Straße and curves north to reach Seckbacher Landstraße, where the station of the same name is located. Beyond Seckbacher Landstraße the tracks leave the tunnel and continue above ground to Depot East (German: Betriebshof Ost) and a connection to the C Line.

== Services ==
=== U4 ===
U4
- Network map

Overview
- Stations: 15

Service
- Services: 04:08 – 01:08; Every 5 min. (RH); Every 7/8 min. (MD); Every 15 min. (N)
- Operator: Verkehrsgesellschaft Frankfurt
- Rolling stock: U5-Triebwagen

History
- Opened: 31 May 1980

Technical
- Line length: 11.3 km (7.0 mi); 24 minutes (avg.)
- Operating speed: 28.3 km/h (17.6 mph) average
- Average inter-station distance: 753 m (2,470 ft)

The U4 service began operation in May 1980, when the Bornheim branch of the B line opened. It was the first U-Bahn service in Frankfurt to run entirely underground, linking the central railway station to Seckbacher Landstraße in Bornheim. In 2001 the U4 was extended almost 2 km (1.2 mi) from the central railway station to Bockenheimer Warte with an intermediate station at the Frankfurt Trade Fair. This extension forms part of the incomplete D Line. In June 2008 some U4 trains were extended past Seckbacher Landstraße to Schäfflestraße on the C Line. After six months of trial operation the line was permanently extended to Enkheim in December 2008, sharing the existing ground-level tracks used by the U7 service. One U4 train every 15 minutes runs as far as Enkheim, with the others terminating at Seckbacher Landstraße.

=== U5 ===
U5
- Network map

Overview
- Stations: 14

Service
- Services: 04:12 – 00:48; Every 5 min. (RH); Every 7/8 min. (MD); Every 15 min. (N)
- Operator: Verkehrsgesellschaft Frankfurt
- Rolling stock: U5-Triebwagen

History
- Opened: 26 May 1974

Technical
- Line length: 7.6 km (4.7 mi); 21 minutes (avg.)
- Operating speed: 21.7 km/h (13.5 mph) average
- Average inter-station distance: 475 m (1,558 ft)

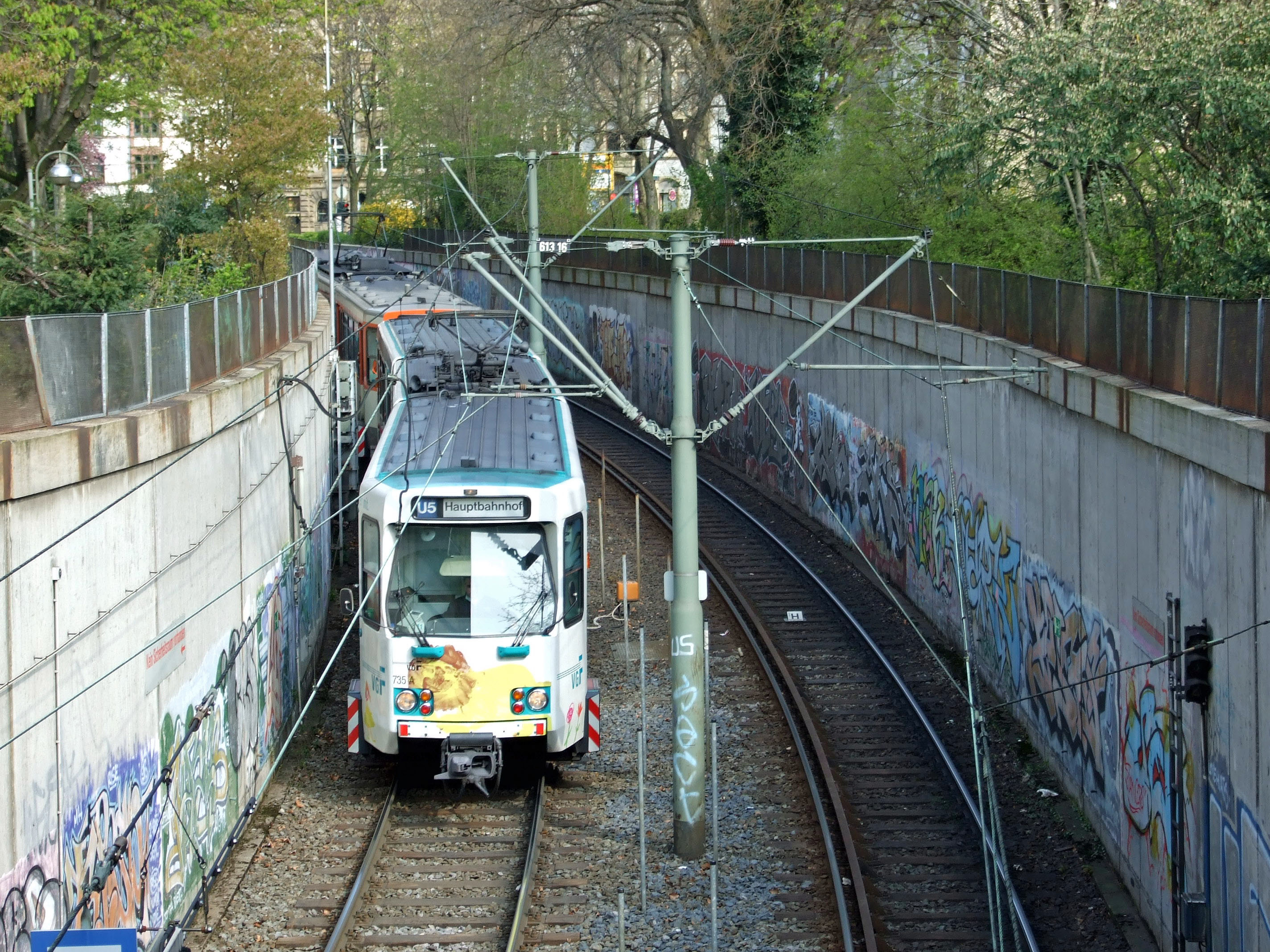
U5 at the tunnel ramp northern Konstablerwache station, bound for downtown

The U5 service runs from the central railway station via Konstablerwache to Preungesheim. It began operation, as the B1, on 26 May 1974 between Willy-Brandt-Platz (then called Theaterplatz) and Gießener Straße, and was extended to Preungesheim in 1977 and the central railway station in 1978 when these sections of the B Line opened. At this time the line also became known as U5.

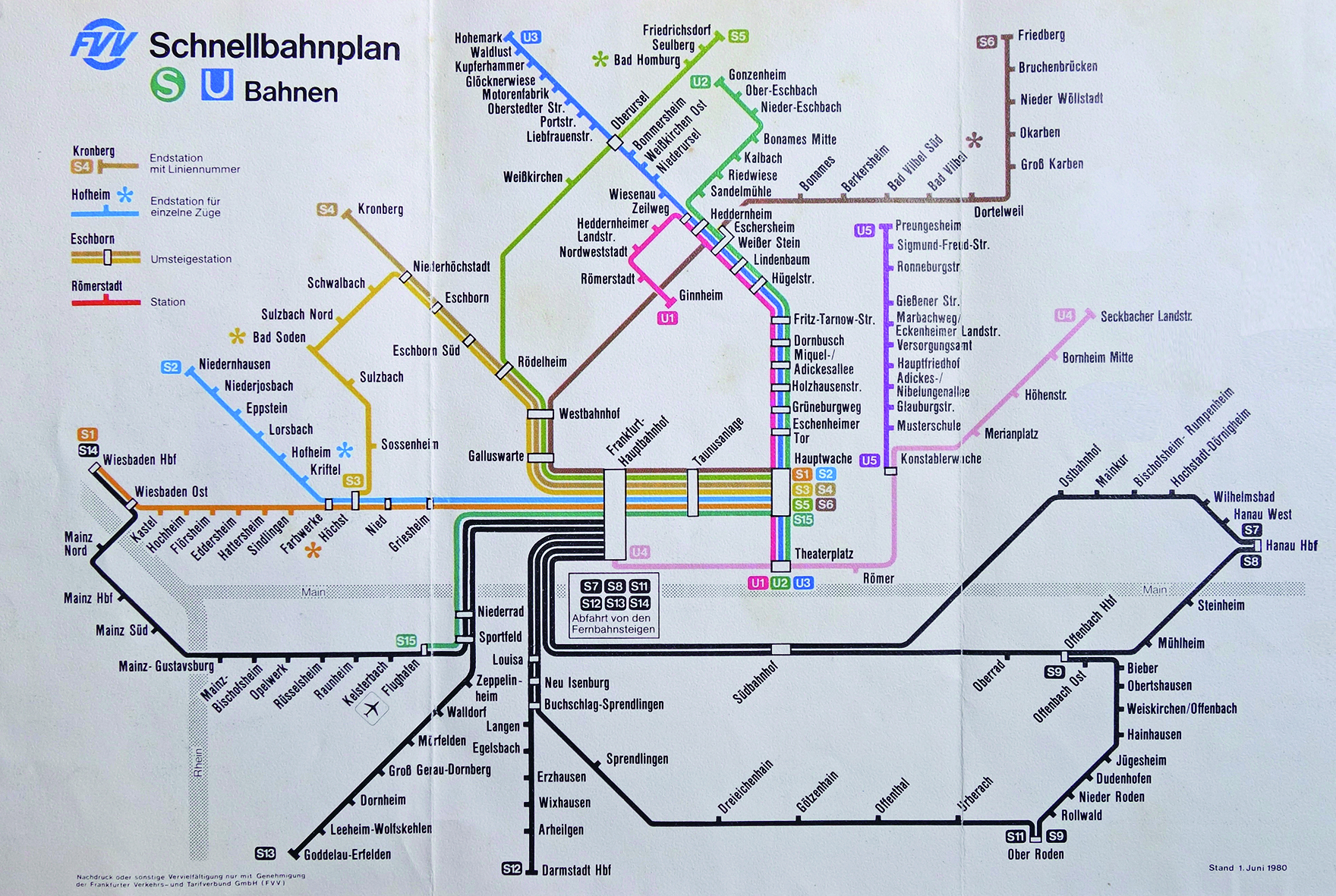
Shortened U5 on a route map from 1980

When the tunnel to Bornheim opened in 1980 the U5 service was cut back to only run between Konstablerwache and Preungesheim. The lack of high-level platforms on the Preungesheim branch meant it was operated with type Pt trams, which were narrower than the U3 trains used on the U4 service to Bornheim and could not use the same high-level platforms on the shared underground section. Although the Transport Committee of the City Council had recognised the problem in 1977, a change to the U3 trains was rejected by the Stadtwerke on the grounds that they were already under construction. It turned out later that this did not correspond to the facts and a change of construction would have been possible. The Stadtwerke attempted in this way to prevent a mixed operation of the delay-prone street-running U5 service with the metro standard U4.

In 1998 a solution was found for the mixed operation of both vehicle types. The Pt trams were converted to type Ptb with widened sections around the doors. The Ptb trams were used by U6 and U7 services on the C Line as well as the U5, which was extended back to the central railway station. Since the rebuilding of the stations on the Preungesheim branch with high platforms, it has been possible to use U5 trains on the U5 service.

Since 27 January 2024 the U5 has again been shortened to only run between Konstablerwache and Preungesheim, this time due to a shortage of train drivers.

== History ==
=== U-Bahn in Altstadt ===
Construction of the B line began on June 28, 1966, exactly three years after the first line. After a ceremony and a laying of the foundation stone in the underground station Miquel- / Adickesallee, where 1963 the first Rammschlag took place, the participants, including Lord Mayor Brundert, Möller Department of Transport and Minister President Zinn went to Friedberger Tor, where, accompanied by speeches, the Straßenbahnerkapelle and Freibier the ceremonial start of construction of the B stretch took place.

The northern part of the line, between Friedberger Tor and Kurt-Schumacher-Straße, was built in an open construction, the western part of the line in mining construction. Towards the Cathedral Square and the Dominican Square were built for this purpose, in January 1970 at the cathedral square with the shield tunneling started in September the breakthrough reached. The tunneling machine was turned on Dominikanerplatz and dug until February 1971, the second tunnel tube to the cathedral square. The line was the first tunnel built in mining style in Frankfurt, this design was later due to the significantly lower loads on the surface to become the rule. However, from the second construction lot (from the Römerberg to the Weißfrauenstraße, May 1970 to March 1971), the New Austrian Tunneling Method (NÖT) was used instead of the shield tunneling.

The tunnel route to be built was located in the area of the old city, which was largely destroyed in 1944, and whose reconstruction was not finally decided until the 1970s.

While large parts of the former Old Town were rebuilt in the course of the 1950s by row buildings and green courtyards in the style of the time, remained the historic nucleus of the city, the cathedral hill (then usually called Cathedral Roman area) an empty, used as a parking lot fallow land. On the east side of the Römerberg, at the site of the later reconstructed half-timbered line, two buildings were built, which were demolished again with the beginning of the subway construction. In 1963, an urban development competition was held for the construction of the Dom-Römer area, which was decided in favor of a large, modern building complex. The subject of the competition was also the design of the entrances to the planned subway station Römer underneath the grounds as well as the underground car park to be built next to it.

The building proposed in the winning design was never realized. However, it created the two extensive underground structures. Subway station and underground parking were built in an open design, which was again very controversial at this point. The excavation pit was located in the historic heart of the city; for thousands of years man-inhabited settlement soil was destroyed for archaeological research. In addition to numerous relics of historical building sculpture, which were usually spent in the Historical Museum, and partly also in the design of the underground station were integrated, was discovered during the construction of a fully preserved and filled wine cellar from the pre-war period.

After completion of the construction work in 1974, the ceiling of the underground car park formed the new course level. The concrete pillars of the underground car park were pulled out about one meter above ground level in order to be able to place the planned large building on this pillar grid later. For almost ten years, until the reconstruction of the Römerberg-Ostzeile and the construction of the Kunsthalle Schirn, the then so-called Höckerzone occupied the historic urban space between the Kaiserdom and Römerberg. The foundations of the Carolingian Royal Palace Frankfurt were conserved in the neighboring Archaeological Garden and made accessible to the public.

The subway station at Römer (today Dom/Römer) lies very low under the street level. The tunnel undercuts the foundations of some blocks nearby. The eastern exit of the station leads over a very long escalator to the outside, the passenger rolls while the whole time directly to the tower of the cathedral, which is a rather unusual way of approaching a medieval building.

The second station of the B-line was built on the Konstablerwache, a square on the shopping street Zeil, which was also used at the time of construction as the main traffic axis for motor vehicle and tram traffic. Under the Konstablerwache, similar to the Hauptwache, an underground rapid-transit railway junction was built. In addition to the metro on the B line, stations were built for the planned C line as well as for the S-Bahn tunnel. Under an underground pedestrian passage (referred to in the technocratic spirit of the time as the B-level) is first the station of the B-lines (C-level) and below this (in the D-level) the community station of C-route and S-Bahn Train. Because of the planned line branching, the station of the B-line was built in three tracks, so are available at the Konstablerwache seven underground platform tracks with a total of five platforms. An initially with planned autotunnel under the Zeil was later deleted from the planning, but there is a preliminary construction work: Today, the generous B-level in west–east direction takes the designated space for this road; originally, two separate access levels were planned north and south of it.

The construction of the tunnel north of the Konstablerwache required the demolition of numerous buildings, including an old factory. The today's Konrad Adenauer road, the connection from the Konstablerwache to the Friedberger gate, developed thus in connection with the subway construction. When excavating the excavation, at the Friedberger Tor, the foundations of the city fortification of 1333, which had been demolished in 1810, were reached, which reached up to seven meters deep into the ground. [12]

The third station of this line was at Theaterplatz (now Willy-Brandt-Platz). The lines of the A-line have been operating here since 1973, and one year later the first interchange station of the Frankfurt subway went into operation here.

In 1974, the first section of the B route opened. From the Theaterplatz to the Konstablerwache, the tunnel in the ramparts led to the surface, from where the train continued as a normal tram in the car road of Eckenheimer Landstrasse. The subway used part of the former tram route to Berkersheim. The new B1 service ended at the Gießener Straße stop. The B1 used, unlike the subways of the A-line, tram-compatible light rail vehicles of the type Pt (t = tunneling). These were 30 cm narrower compared to the type U2 used on the A-line and at that time had novel swivel stages on the doors, so that they could also be used on tram routes without adapting the tracks. Since initially only these cars in the tunnel reversed, the platforms were widened with a bolted angle.

=== Hauptbahnhof Extension ===
The tunnel of the B-line was extended in 1978 by a station: For the tenth anniversary of the Frankfurt subway their network finally reached the central railway station. From the Theaterplatz, the new tunnel ran along the Gutleutstrasse a little to the west, until it turned off from Elbestraße under Gründerzeit blocks and then turned north to finally reach the main train station.

The underground station at the central railway station was built in four tracks. According to the traffic planning of the city should cross here two subway lines: the basic route B, coming from the old town and in the direction of Galluswarte and Höchst continuing, and the basic route D, which should lead from Schwanheim and Niederrad in the direction of Messe and Bockenheim.

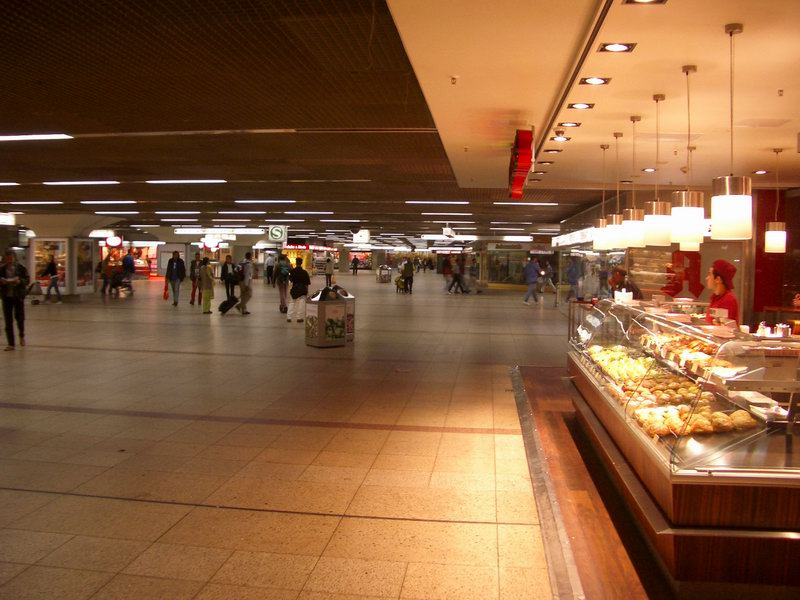
The "B-level" at the central railway station

As at the Hauptwache and Konstablerwache, an extensive rapid-transit railway node deep underground was built at the central railway station. Under the carriageway of the station forecourt, over which numerous tram routes and the federal highway 44 lead, was initially created here again a very large underground shopping arcade (B-level). In the third level of the four-track subway station, as the station forecourt in north–south orientation, and in the fourth level across the four-track S-Bahn station, which is located largely under the station building of the central railway station. In the gable northwest of the two underground high-speed stations, a three-storey underground car park was built. These facilities were again built in an open pit, for many years was instead of Bahnhofsplatzes a deep hole, the traffic was diverted, the northern part of the historic station building, similar to the previously baroque main guard, removed, stored and rebuilt after completion of construction.

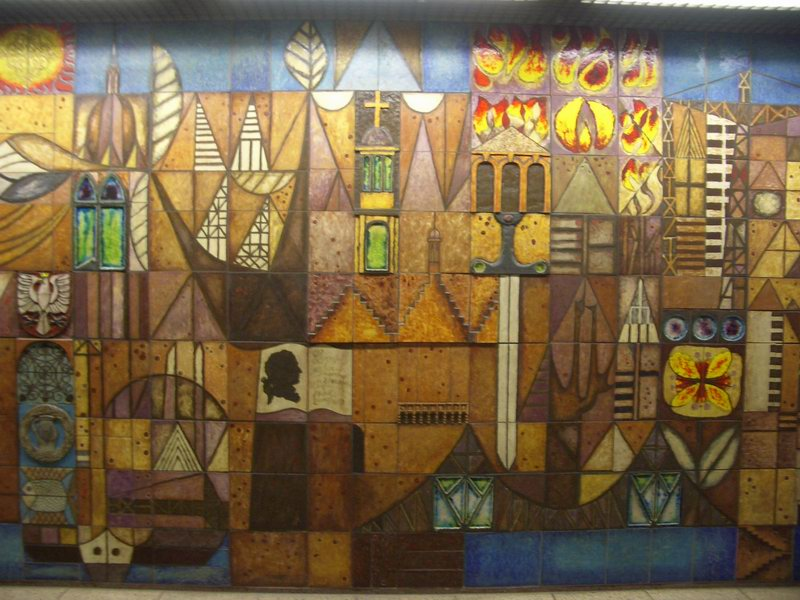
Art in the subway, here: the history of the city in pictures

The station forecourt was closed to the opening of the rapid-transit railway node for pedestrians - the access from the station to the city and to the tram took place for many years through the confusing B-level, the advantage of the head station, the ground-level accessibility of the trains was lost.

With reaching the central railway station the rapid-transit railway net in the city 1978 was largely completed. The basic routes A and B were in operation, the first tunnel section of the S-Bahn (to the Hauptwache) opened in the same year at the central railway station (D), the Hauptwache (C) and the Konstablerwache (C, S) were platforms for future planned lines were built as an advance with and waited their use. The first construction phase of the network, characterized by the primacy of a technocratic traffic planning (public transport and pedestrian traffic into the underground), which ultimately served the interests of automobile traffic, and a substantial renunciation of aesthetic design was completed.

== Other works ==
Only a few changes have been made to the subway's B line since it opened. The subway station Dom / Römer was rebuilt in the 1990s and received a rotunda in the access level. In the central railway station of the central railway station, the 30-year-old, wall-hung photographs from Frankfurt were replaced by new pictures.

The barrier-free expansion of the main line began on 23 January 2015 at the stations Bockenheimer Warte and Festhalle / Messe. While at the fair, analogous to the C-track, the tracks were raised by gravel, has been removed at the U4 terminus the provisional raised in 2002 platform again. By the end of March, the tracks were also cut open at all other stations along the U4. Since mid-April, the new U5 series has also been used on the U4. To this end, all the old cars of the type U3, which previously drove exclusively on the U4, were exchanged for new U5 cars from the U6. traffIQ and VGF have worked out the concept with the Disability Commissioner and the Frankfurt Disabled Workers' Association (FBAG), as the U4 is used by more people than the U6.

=== Wheelchair accessibility in the north ===
As resistance to the planned construction of barrier-free elevated platforms increased along the above-ground section in the Northrend, an opinion was commissioned in 2007 to investigate whether the route from Preungesheim to Konstablerwache was integrated into the tram network at the initiative of the black-green city government could be. Nevertheless, the tunneling station would nevertheless have been provided as an end point, as a result of which the line shortening of 1980 along with the associated operational problems (single-lane terminal) would have been repeated in practice. The U5 should instead be extended from the Konstablerwache on the route of the U4 on the Seckbacher country road and the depot East, then on the route of the U7 to Schäfflestraße. Meanwhile, the U4 is already going there. In 2008, the report was extended to include a plan case for a second line from Preungesheim via Glauburgstraße, Friedberger Landstraße, Konstablerwache (above ground) and the old town section to the central railway station.

A citizens' initiative had presented in October 2008, new plans for through stations based on the Stuttgart model, which should enable barrier-free operation with high-floor wagons and mid-platform platforms at the stations Musterschule and Glauburgstraße. At the stops north of Glauburgstraße there would be enough space for conventional elevated platforms. This new proposal was passed to the City of Frankfurt for approval by decision of the Frankfurt Transport Committee on 28 October 2008.

The results of both appraisals (tram and through stations) were presented together and served as the basis for a final decision on the future of the U5. [20] [21] The investigation of the tram solution showed that from an overall transport planning point of view only the light rail solution is worthy of prosecution. The integration into the tram network would lead to a weakening of public transport and an increase in motor vehicle traffic. In addition, the tram solution raises considerable questions regarding operational feasibility.

The new proposal of the city, neither mid-high platforms nor Troglösungen to build, but instead at the two stops Musterschule and Glauburgstraße two staggered, each 72 meters long and up to 80 cm high Seitenbahnsteige to meet, met with varying degrees of resonance. While the supporters of an underground railway operating in the city center greeted the concept, resistance was provoked in the affected district of Nordend.

In the Frankfurt city council meeting of July 1, 2010, the proposal, which was once again optimized in the spring of 2010, found broad support in the parliamentary groups of the CDU, SPD, FDP, Greens, and Republicans against leftists, the FAG, the Free Voters, and the NPD. After necessary sewer construction work in 2012, the first five stations between Sigmund-Freud-Straße and Marbachweg / Sozialzentrum were built in 2013. The stations Main Cemetery and German National Library were equipped in 2014 with 80 cm high elevated platforms. The rebuilding of the station Preungesheim took place from July to November 2015 and takes up the pre-planning for the extension to the Frankfurt mountain by the positions of side and middle platform were exchanged compared to the original condition. Original plans provided for 2013, the station Preungesheim initially provisionally for about €560,000 to increase, then in time before the commissioning of the extension to the European district (then planned for 2019) completely demolished and build again. These plans were revised in the short term during the course of 2013. The stops Glauburgstraße and Musterschule have been rebuilt since March 29, 2016. With the on 9 October carried out re-commissioning of the line and the station Musterschule eliminates the stop Eckenheimer Landstraße / Marbachweg permanently and the stop New Jewish Cemetery until its conversion, which will take place from 2018. The opening of the station Glauburgstraße shifted to October 29 due to disruptions in the construction process.

== Opening dates ==
Stretch	Opening	Stations	Notes
Eschenheimer Anlage – Adlerflychtstraße	6 April 1882	...	Horse-drawn railway of the FTG, today part of the U5.
Adlerflychtstraße – Hauptfriedhof	4 June 1892	...	Horse-drawn track of the FTG, today part of the U5.
Hauptfriedhof – Schwabstraße	1907	...	Tram line, today part of the U5 (operating distance).
Marbachweg – Gießener Straße	1936	...	Tram line, replaced further south route of 1915, today part of the U5.
Theaterplatz – Konstablerwache	26 May 1974	3	Opening of the first section of the B-line, driven by the U-tram service B1 Theaterplatz - Gießener Straße.
Konstablerwache – Gießener Straße	26 May 1974	7	Takeover of the tram in Eckenheimer Landstraße.
Theaterplatz – Hauptbahnhof	28 May 1978	1	Connection of the central railway station to the underground network.
Gießener Straße – Preungesheim	28 May 1978	4	Extension of the U5 to a light rail section in the Gießener Straße, about 1.7 km track length.
Konstablerwache – Seckbacher Landstraße	31 May 1980	4	Opening of the subway in Bornheim, the new U4 as a completely underground, first "real" subway service in Frankfurt, the U5 is withdrawn to the station Konstablerwache.
Hauptbahnhof – Bockenheimer Warte (D-Strecke)	10 February 2001	2	Since no continuous operation is possible on the two sections of the D route built so far, in 2001 the U4 was extended by the completed section DI to the Bockenheimer Warte.
Seckbacher Landstraße – Schäfflestraße (Betriebshof/C-Strecke)	15 June 2008	1	Try to extend U4 via depot tracks to C line until December 2008.
Seckbacher Landstraße – Enkheim (C-Strecke)	14 December 2008	5	Extension of the U4 (same extent w.o.) on depot tracks, but continue on Line C to Enkheim
Konstablerwache – Preungesheim	9 October 2016	10	Reopening of the above-ground route with elevated platforms and operation with U5 railcar. Operation with Ptb railcars has been discontinued.

== Future plans ==
=== Europaviertel ===
In order to provide better transport connections to the new developments in the Europaviertel an extension of the B Line westwards is under construction and will be served by the U5. From the central railway station the 2.7 km (1.7 mi) long branch will continue in a tunnel with an underground station provisionally named Güterplatz before running on the surface along the centre of Europa-Allee with three more stations, provisionally named Emser Brücke, Europagarten and Wohnpark. The first preparatory work for the extension began in 2013, and construction of the underground section should have started in 2017 but was delayed until 2019. As of 2023 it was planned for this section to open in 2027, followed by a further extension with stations at Schmidtstraße and Römerhof. Stations on the extension will have 100 m long platforms.

The extension was originally expected to cost 217.3 million euros, by the start of construction in 2019 this had risen to 373.5 million euros and by 2023 the expected cost was 515 million euros.

=== Frankfurter Berg ===
An extension of the Preungesheim branch to Frankfurter Berg is planned, with a terminus at the S-Bahn station. The 1.7 km (1.1 mi) long route will run along the Homburger Landstraße and have intermediate stations at August-Schanz-Straße and Berkersheimer Weg. At Jean-Monnet-Straße the route will switch from the west side to the centre of Homburger Landstraße. The original plans for the extension were cancelled in 2012 but funding was approved by the Frankfurt City Council in 2017. The extension is expected to enter service in 2028. During the work to construct high platforms at Preungesheim station it was also prepared for the extension. Only the buffer stops on tracks 1 and 2 have to be removed to extend the line. Track 3 will remain for trains terminating at Preungesheim in the future.

=== Bergen ===
At the end of the branch to Bornheim, an underground extension of the U4 via Seckbach to Bergen was originally planned. This line was part of the incorporation agreement between Frankfurt and the former city of Bergen-Enkheim, which came into force in 1978. Due to the low projected cost-benefit factor and the resulting poor prospects for federal and state funding, implementation of this extension is unlikely. A short extension to a station at Atzelberg in Seckbach is more likely and the turn-back facility on Seckbacher Landstraße is already prepared for this.
