= Praunheim =

- Quarter of Frankfurt am Main
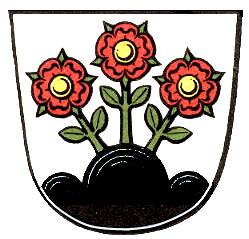
- Coat of arms

- Location of Praunheim (red) and the Ortsbezirk Mitte-West (light red) within Frankfurt am Main
- Interactive map of Praunheim
- Location within Germany Location within Hesse
- Coordinates: 50°07′54″N 08°36′35″E
- Country: Germany
- State: Hesse
- Admin. region: Darmstadt
- District: Urban district
- City: Frankfurt am Main

Area
  - Total: 4.556 km^{2} (1.759 sq mi)

Population (2020-12-31)
  - Total: 16,729
  - Density: 3,672/km^{2} (9,510/sq mi)
- Time zone: UTC+01:00 (CET)
  - Summer (DST): UTC+02:00 (CEST)
- Postal codes: 60488
- Dialling codes: 069
- Vehicle registration: F
- Website: www.praunheim.de

Praunheim (German pronunciation: [ˈpʁaʊnhaɪm]) is a quarter of Frankfurt am Main, Germany. It is part of the Ortsbezirk Mitte-West and is subdivided into five Stadtbezirke: Praunheim, Praunheim-Nord, Praunheim-Süd, Alt-Praunheim and Westhausen.

It is located along the north bank of the river Nidda and is composed of two areas: Alt Praunheim (old Praunheim), a typical Hessian village with a central commercial street and some timber beam houses, located to the east and the Siedlung Praunheim, a residential development built in the 1920s under the auspices of town planner Ernst May located to the west. The development comprises 1500 houses that were built from 1926 through 1929.

Praunheim belonged to the Archbishopric of Mainz. Ecclesiastical Middle Authority was the Archdeacon of the provost of St. Peter in Mainz.

Notable residents of Praunheim have included the jazz trombonist Albert Mangelsdorff, his brother, the saxophonist Emil Mangelsdorff and film maker Rosa von Praunheim.
