= Hausen (Frankfurt am Main) =

Quarter of Frankfurt am Main, Germany

- Quarter of Frankfurt am Main
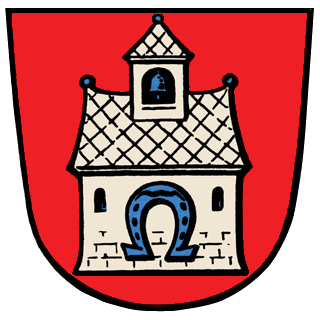
- Coat of arms

- Location of Hausen (red) and the Ortsbezirk Mitte-West (light red) within Frankfurt am Main
- Interactive map of Hausen
- Location within Germany Location within Hesse
- Coordinates: 50°07′56″N 08°37′27″E
- Country: Germany
- State: Hesse
- Admin. region: Darmstadt
- District: Urban district
- City: Frankfurt am Main

Area
  - Total: 1.255 km^{2} (0.485 sq mi)

Population (2024-12-31)
  - Total: 9,000
  - Density: 7,200/km^{2} (19,000/sq mi)
- Time zone: UTC+01:00 (CET)
  - Summer (DST): UTC+02:00 (CEST)
- Postal codes: 60488
- Dialling codes: 069
- Vehicle registration: F
- Website: www.frankfurt.de

Hausen (German pronunciation: [ˈhaʊzn̩]) is a quarter of Frankfurt am Main, Germany. It is part of the Ortsbezirk Mitte-West. It has a population of over 9,000 as of 2024.

== Infrastructure ==
The village is within 10 minutes of Frankfurt via public roadways, and has public transportation routes serving the area, such as Hausen-Raitbach and three bus routes.

== Education ==
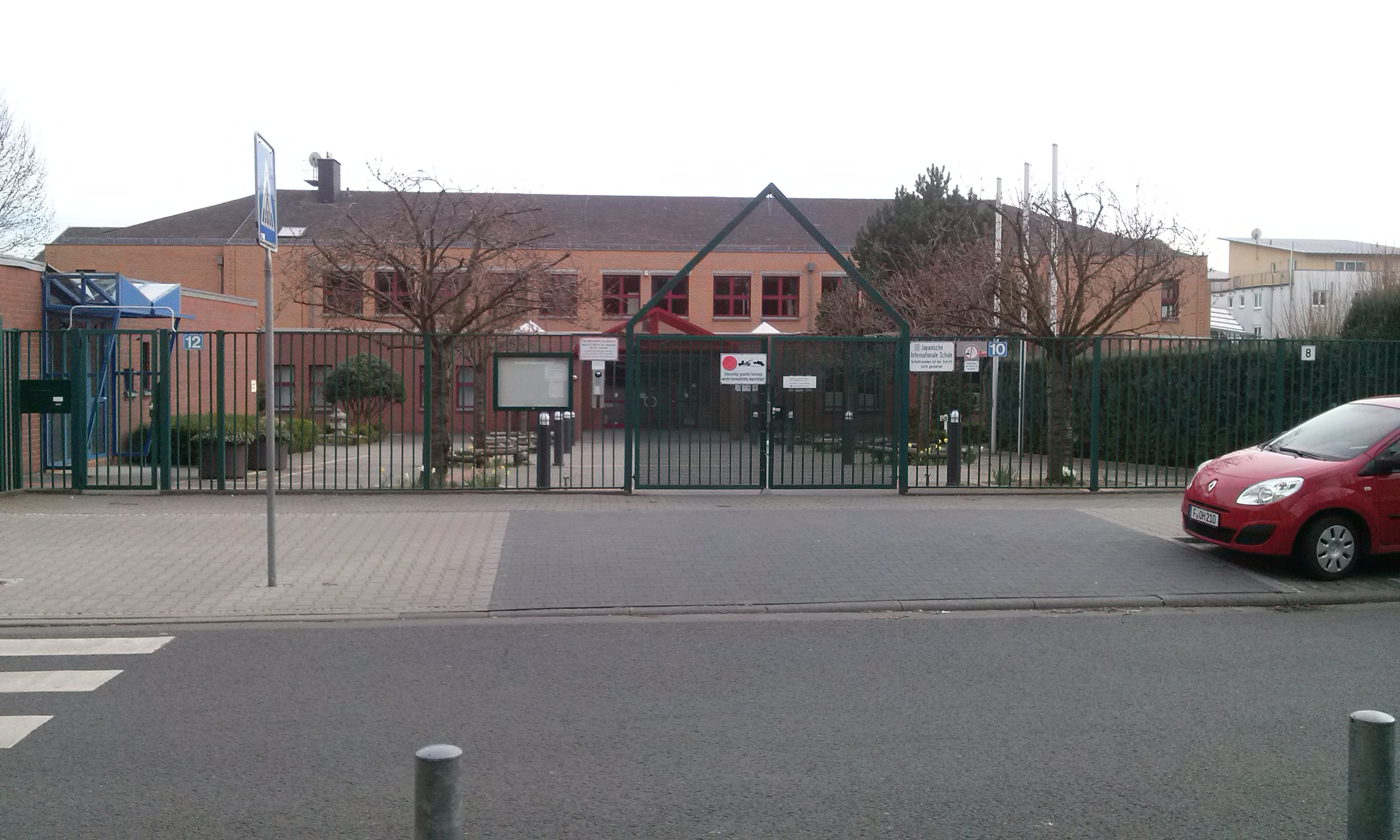
Japanische Internationale Schule Frankfurt

The Japanische Internationale Schule Frankfurt, a Japanese international school, is in Hausen.
