= Rosa-Luxemburg-Straße (Frankfurt am Main) =

Street in Frankfurt

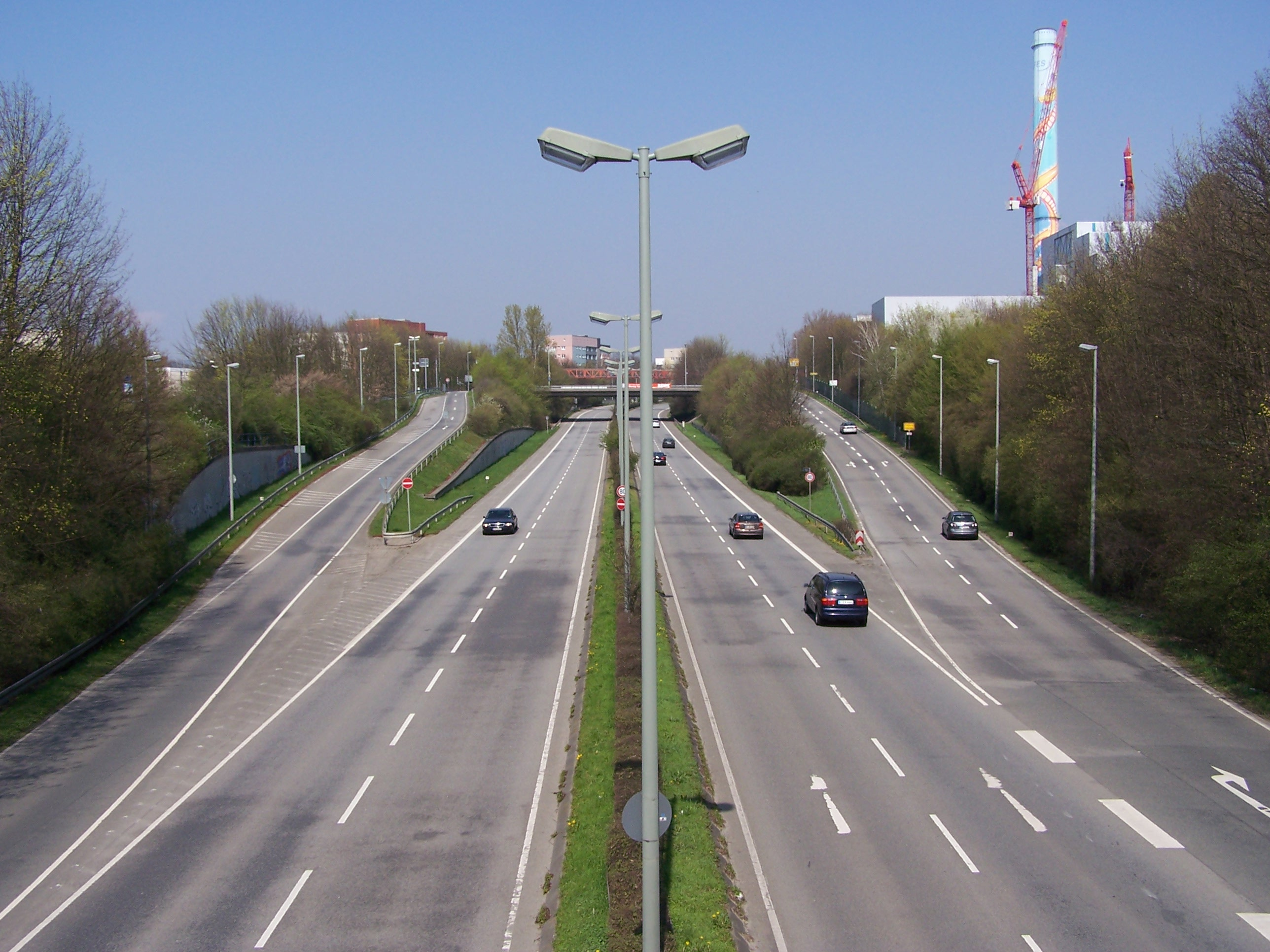
Rosa-Luxemburg-Straße passing through Heddernheim

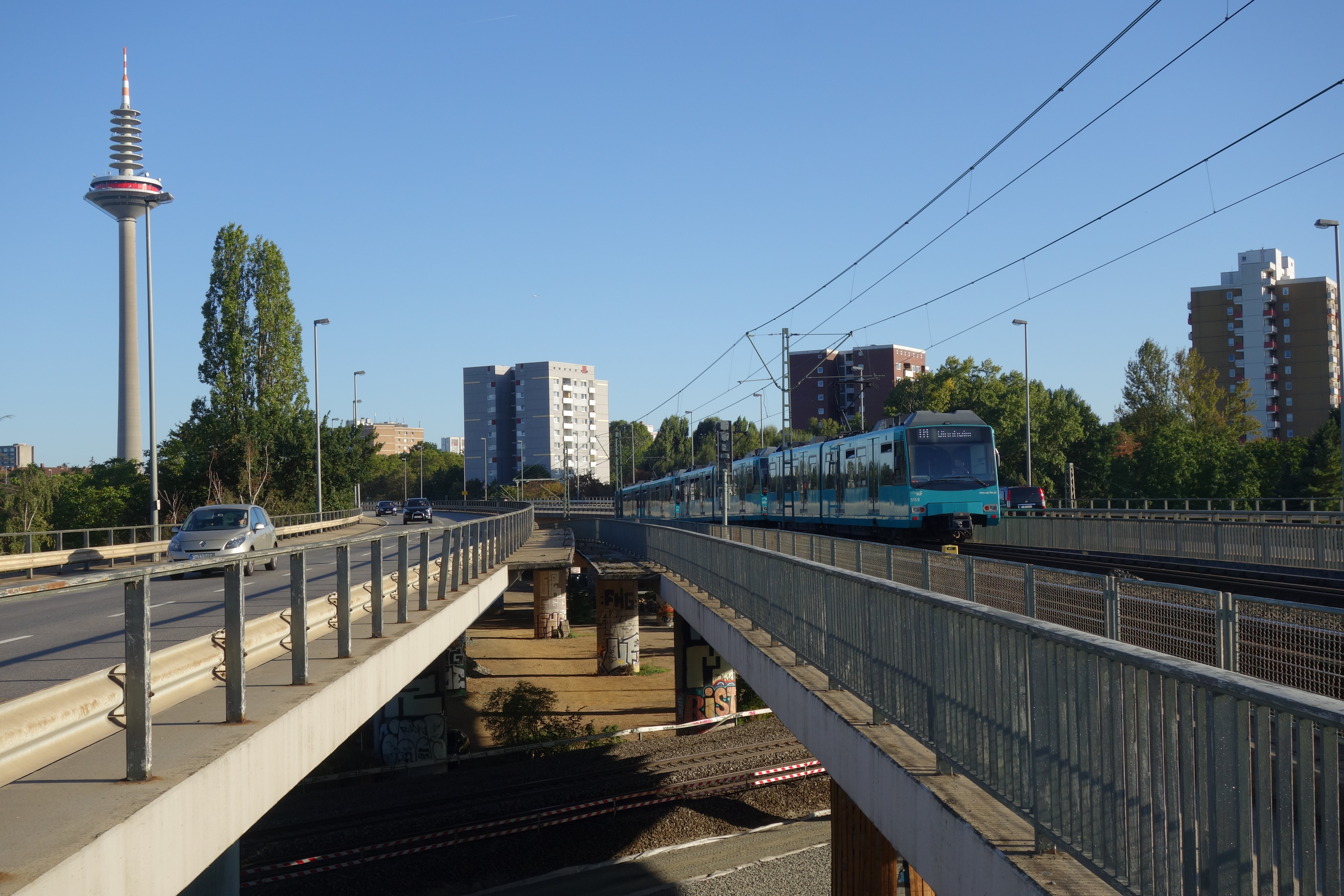
Elevated route for motorway and subway near Niddapark, facing Ginnheim; Europaturm tower on the left.

Rosa-Luxemburg-Straße (L3004) is a major grade-separated highway in Frankfurt am Main, Germany. At the southern end it connects to Miquelallee and the Bundesautobahn 66 motorway close to the Europaturm and the Deutsche Bundesbank. The route runs as an elevated highway northwards through Ginnheim, where U-Bahn Line D joins to run in the central reservation through Niddapark and Römerstadt before passing immediately to the east of Nordwestzentrum.

The route continues past the new Riedberg settlement, then parallel with U-Bahn Line A to Frankfurt's border with Oberursel-Weißkirchen where the road transitions to become Frankfurter Landstraße.

During 2020‒2021 a 65-metre (213 ft) bridge next to Nordwestzentrum was due to be renovated at a cost of 1.9 million.

== Name ==
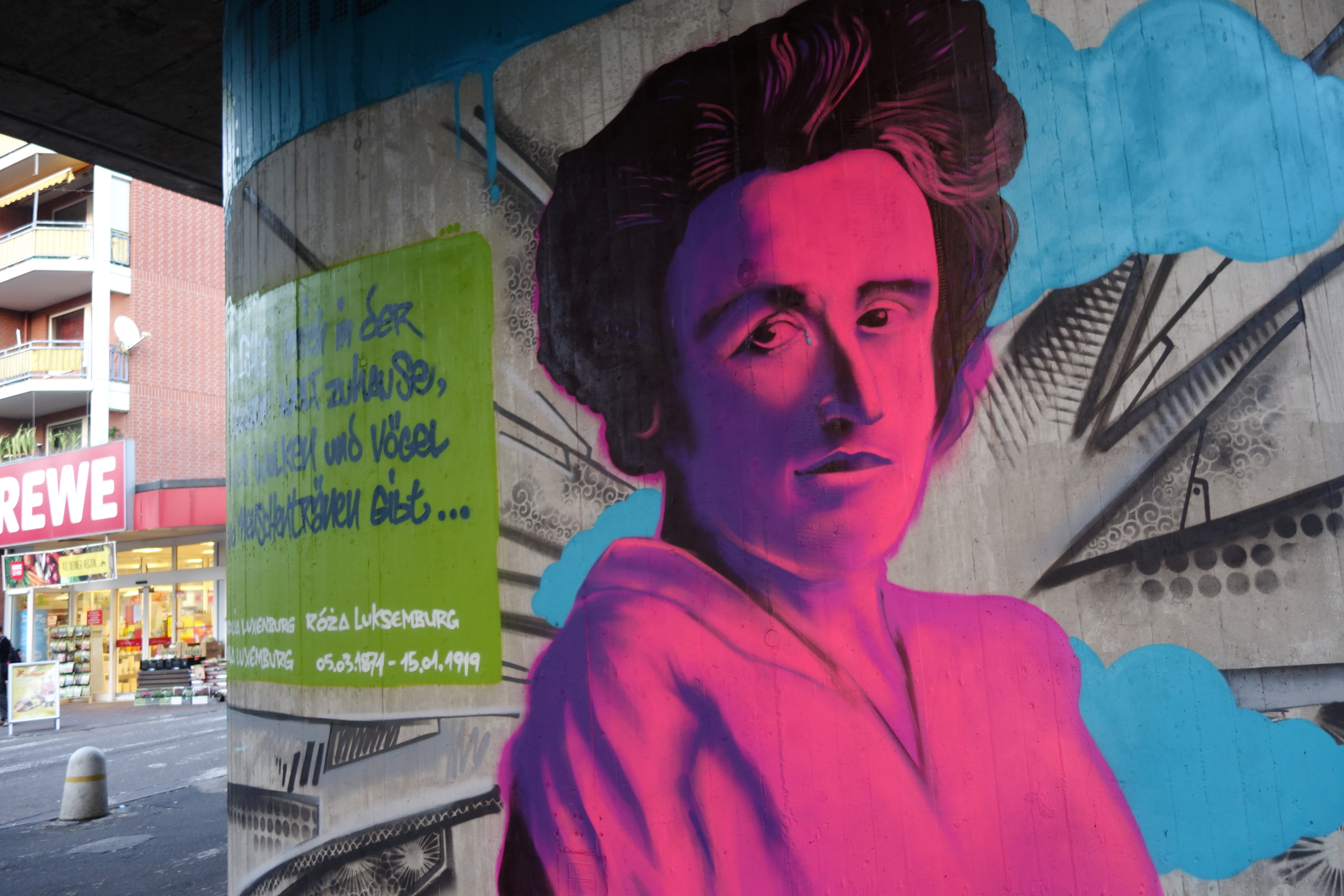
Portrait of Rosa Luxemburg at a pier in Ginnheim

The road's name refers to activist Rosa Luxemburg. She is portrayed at a pier of the elevated road section in Ginnheim – in pink since in German language Rosa is also a word for that colour.
