= U-Bahn Line D (Frankfurt U-Bahn) =

Incomplete light rail line in Frankfurt, Germany

The D Line is a partially completed north‒south route of the Frankfurt U-Bahn. The line has been planned since the 1960s and as of 2021 three sections had been constructed and were in use for U-Bahn services, with another section of the planned route operated by trams. As the route is not continuous there are no through services, but parts of it are used by underground services U1, U4, U8, U9. The planned Ginnheim Curve (Ginnheimer Kurve) would run via Frankfurt University's Campus Westend to fill the gap.

The oldest section between Ginnheim and Heddernheim was constructed between 1968‒1978 as a branch of the A Line serving the Nordweststadt and carries U1 and U9 services. The central section between the main railway station and Bockenheimer Warte opened in 2001 and is operated as an extension of the U4 service from the B Line. The most northerly section has two stations serving new development in Riedberg and opened in 2010 and carries U8 and U9 services.

South of the River Main between the University Hospital and Schwanheim the planned route of the D Line remains operated by low-floor trams but has mostly been upgraded run on reserved track.

== Route ==
The route of the D Line is divided into four sections, identified with roman numerals: D I (Hauptbahnhof – Bockenheimer Warte, D III (Ginnheim – Heddernheim) and D IV (Riedberg) are in operation. Section D II (Bockenheimer Warte – Ginnheim) is still in the planning stage.

=== D III: Ginnheim – Heddernheim ===
The northern part of this section, to the station at Nordwestzentrum, opened as a branch of the A Line in October 1968. It was part of Frankfurt's first U-Bahn service, the A1 when the other branches of the A Line were still being operated with converted tram vehicles under tram line numbers. It was extended to Römerhof in 1974 and Ginnheim in 1978. The line now carries U1 (the former A1) and U9 services. The line is rotated more than 90 degrees from the Line A, which is only explained by the intention to integrate the section later in the Line D.

=== D I: Hauptbahnhof – Bockenheimer Warte ===
The 1.7 km (1.1 mi) section from Hauptbahnhof to Bockenheimer Warte was opened on 10 February 2001. It is entirely underground and has one intermediate station at the Frankfurt Trade Fair. The line is operated by U4 services as an extension of the U-Bahn Line B route.

The underground station at Hauptbahnhof was opened in 1978 as the terminus of the B Line, but ready for use by the D Line with four tracks accessed via two island platforms. The station extends in a north-south direction under the station forecourt, with the S-Bahn City Tunnel and crossing beneath it approximately at right angles. The trains of lines U4 and U5 currently only use only the two middle and the western track.

From the Hauptbahnhof the D Line tunnel heads in a northerly direction, following Düsseldorfer Straße to Platz der Republik. The stump of the westwards B Line tunnel branches off to the west and is used as a turning facility for the U5 line until the extension to Europaviertel opens.

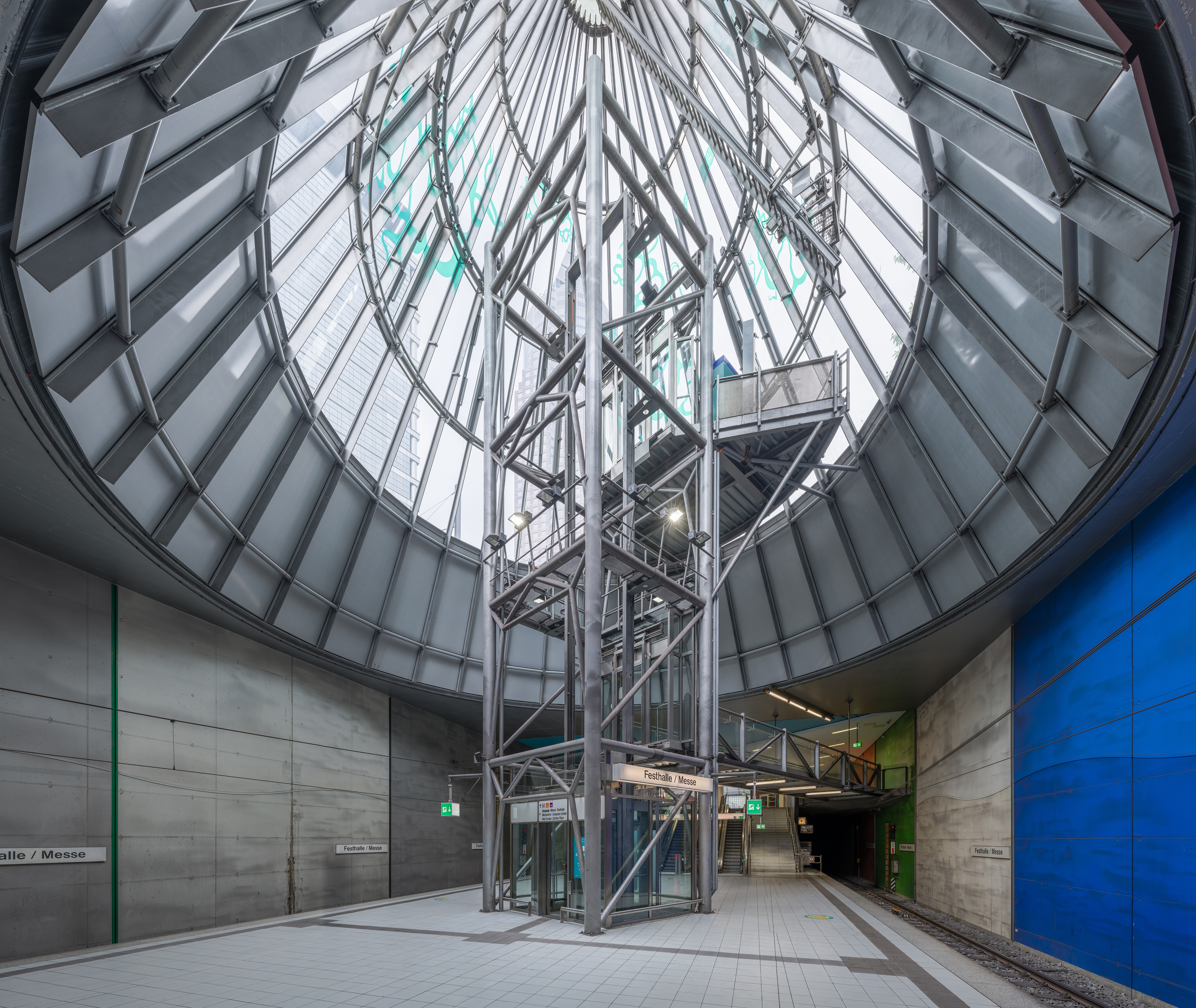
Festhalle/Messe station

The D Line continues under the Friedrich-Ebert-Anlage, where after a short time the underground station Festhalle/Messe at the Frankfurt Trade Fair is reached. This station is equipped with an extremely wide platform due to the expected high number of passengers. The platform hall itself is two storeys high and receives natural light through two glass cones at street level at above it. Beyond the station are two short tunnel stumps, which were originally intended for a subway line to the Rebstock area. This plan was abandoned and instead a tram line to Rebstock opened in 2003.

The two single-track tunnels then turn northwest and follow the Senckenberganlage to the terminus Bockenheimer Warte, where there is an interchange with the C Line. The station was built in two sections. The northern part with the upper-level C Line platforms opened in 1986. At that time, the intersecting elements of the D Line and a direct connection to the lower-level platforms was also built. In contrast, the entire southern part of the station building with the lower tracks of the D line was only built in 2001. The platform hall is two storeys high. This was not planned, but Frankfurt University intended to construct a new library building above the station. When the university decided instead to abandon the Bockenheim campus in the medium term, the plans were abandoned and the current situation arose. Immediately south of the station is a single-track connecting tunnel between the C and D lines. It is only connected to a siding on the C Line and not suitable for use in normal operation. To the north of the station the D Line ends in a four-track reversing facility, which reaches just past Sophienstraße. The extension of the route to Ginnheim, continuation (D II) would connect to the outer tracks and the other two could still be used for by trains terminating at Bockenheimer Warte. South of the station, the Senckenberg Museum of Natural History used the tunnelling work to construct an underground two-storey warehouse complex that extends across the entire width of the Senckenberganlage and also has an emergency exit into the U-Bahn tunnel.

=== D IV: Riedberg ===
This 4 km (2.5 mi) long section opened on 12 December 2010 and connects the stations at Niederursel (on the Oberursel branch of the A Line) and Kalbach (on the Bad Homburg branch of the A Line), providing transport links to new housing in the Riedberg area. It is entirely above ground and has two new stations: Uni Campus Riedberg and Riedberg, the latter near Nelly Sachs Platz. Some of the larger parts of the construction work were the cutting through the slope directly north of the station Niederursel and the new bridges over Rosa-Luxemburg-Straße and the A661.

In connection with this work a triangular junction was built between the stations at Heddernheimer Landstraße and Wiesenau to allow trains from Riedberg to access the section of the D Line towards Ginnheim. For this, the existing route to the north-east from the tunnel portal at Heddernheimer Landstraße was swung slightly to the east and the station was rebuilt slightly to the east with 80 cm (31 in) high platforms.

== Planned extensions ==
=== D II: Bockenheimer Warte - Ginnheim ===
After the opening of section D I to Bockenheimer Warte in 2001 it was planned for construction of the missing section to Ginnheim to begin in 2006. After the local elections in 2006, however, the already approved planning was discarded and the plan stopped. A second attempt to build this section of line began in 2010 and a feasibility study of possible routes was published in 2021.

Two of the possible routes were chosen for further consideration, a direct route via the Europaturm, or a longer curved route also serving Frankfurt University's Campus Westend. As of 2024 the route via the University is the preferred option and the line is expected to be built by 2032.

This section will be operated as an extension of the U4 service, which will continue north to Nieder-Eschbach via Riedberg and replace the current U9.

=== Southern Extension ===
==== Hauptbahnhof – Niederrad ====
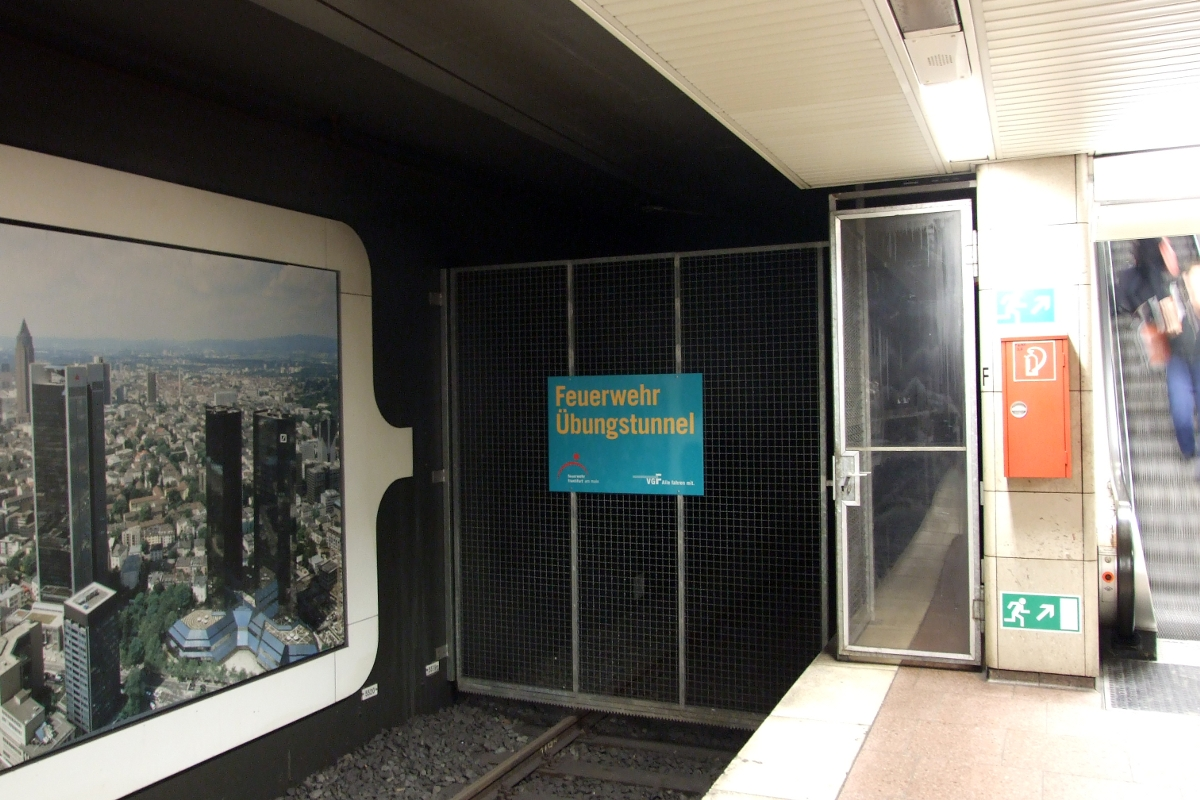
In addition to the FRTC Frankfurt model U-Bahn station facility, the Frankfurt Fire Brigade use the Line D "Practice Tunnel" (Feuerwehr Übungstunnel) at Frankfurt Hauptbahnhof for training.

It was originally planned to run southwards from Frankfurt Hauptbahnhof, under the River Main to Niederrad and then on to Schwanheim or Frankfurt Stadion station. Sections of the planned route via Universitätsklinikum Frankfurt and Niederrad were partially upgraded in the 1970s in anticipation of conversion to light rail operation. Instead this route and its branches remain operated by tram services.

As of 2021 the only visible construction is an extra unused platform and a pair of stub tunnels heading southwards at the main railway station U-Bahn level. The extra platform is only connected to track in the direction of Bockenheimer Warte and cannot be used in normal service. This platform and the longer of the stub tunnels are used as the Firefighting Practice Tunnel (Feuerwehr Übungstunnel) by the Frankfurt Fire Brigade.

The tunnel stubs extend approximately to the southern edge of the station forecourt. From here, the projected tunnel would follow Wiesenhüttenstraße to the Main. Under the river the route would curve to the west below Theodor-Stern-Kai. The tunnel would follow the Main river and reach the existing tram line via a ramp in the area of the University Hospital. The tram line already runs on reserved track as far as the stop at Heinrich-Hoffmann-Straße / Blutspendedienst, the tram line, inaugurated in 1959, is already transposed independent of the road.Beyond this more extensive upgrade measures would be required along Deutschordenstraße, where the tram currently shares the road with other traffic. The tram route along Bruchfeldstraße to Haardtwaldplatz would be closed and replaced by a bus line.

At Triftstraße the line split would into two branches, which largely correspond to the existing tram routes to the stadium and to Schwanheim.

==== Niederrad - Schwanheim ====
The second part of the light rail route from Niederrad to Schwanheim was completed in 1975 and is in use for tram traffic. It runs on reserved track in the centre of the road for its entire length. In the case of a switch to light rail operation, only the platforms of the existing stops would have to be expanded to a height of 80 cm (31 in) and a length of 105 metres (344 ft). The route runs along the Triftstraße and Adolf-Miersch-Straße to Niederrad station, where there is a connection to the S-Bahn network. The line then continues along Lyoner Straße an at the Kiesschneise stop it reaches the route of the former Frankfurt Waldbahn, which opened in 1889. This was also prepared in the mid-1970s for a possible light rail operation.

Shortly after this the line would leave today's tram route and swing to the north along Straßburger Straße through Goldstein. The required route was already prepared in the mid-70s and should have been created together with the new line by Niederrad. Due to protests of the residents, who feared a separation effect of the light rail route, the building was postponed to the time of conversion to U-Bahn. In the meantime, however, it is planned to implement the new line in the medium term anyway in order to improve the development of the residential area Goldstein.

At the Ferdinand-Dirichs-Weg the Frankfurt Waldbahn route would be reached again and followed to the terminus at Rheinlandstraße, where the Frankfurt Transport Museum is located. A continuation to the southern main entrance of the Industriepark Höchst has been discussed.

==== Niederrad - Stadion ====
The branch to the Waldstadion stadium follows the current tram route along Rennbahnstraße and Schwarzwaldstraße south from the junction on Triftstraße. In the case of the switch to U-Bahn operation extensive reconstruction measures would be required separate the route from other road traffic.

From the stop at Oberforsthaus, the line would leave the street and run parallel to Mörfelder Landstraße. A new station would be built closer to the stadium to replace the current tram stop and a continuation to the airport would be possible from here.

== Services ==
The U9 is the only service to use the D Line over the majority of its length. Other U-Bahn services using parts of the line are the U1, U4 and U8

=== U9 ===
U9

Overview
- Stations: 12

Service
- Services: 04:32 AM – 00:35 AM; Every 15 min. (RH); Every 15 min. (MD); Every 30 min. (N)
- Operator(s): Verkehrsgesellschaft Frankfurt
- Rolling stock: U5-Triebwagen

History
- Opened: 12 December 2010

Technical
- Line length: 10.3 km (6.4 mi); 19 minutes (avg.)
- Operating speed: 30.9 km/h (19.2 mph) average

The U9 service runs from Ginnheim via Nordwestzentrum and Riedberg, to Nieder-Eschbach. It is the only U-Bahn service in Frankfurt which does not serve the city centre. It began operation with the U8 on 12 December 2010, when the line through Riedberg opened. The service runs over the D Line from Ginnsheim to Heddernheim before using a short section of the A Line to link to the section of the D Line through Riedberg. At Kalbach the U9 joins the A Line branch towards Bad Homburg as far as Nieder-Eschbach.
