= FRTC Frankfurt =

Coordinates: 50.146°N 8.688°E

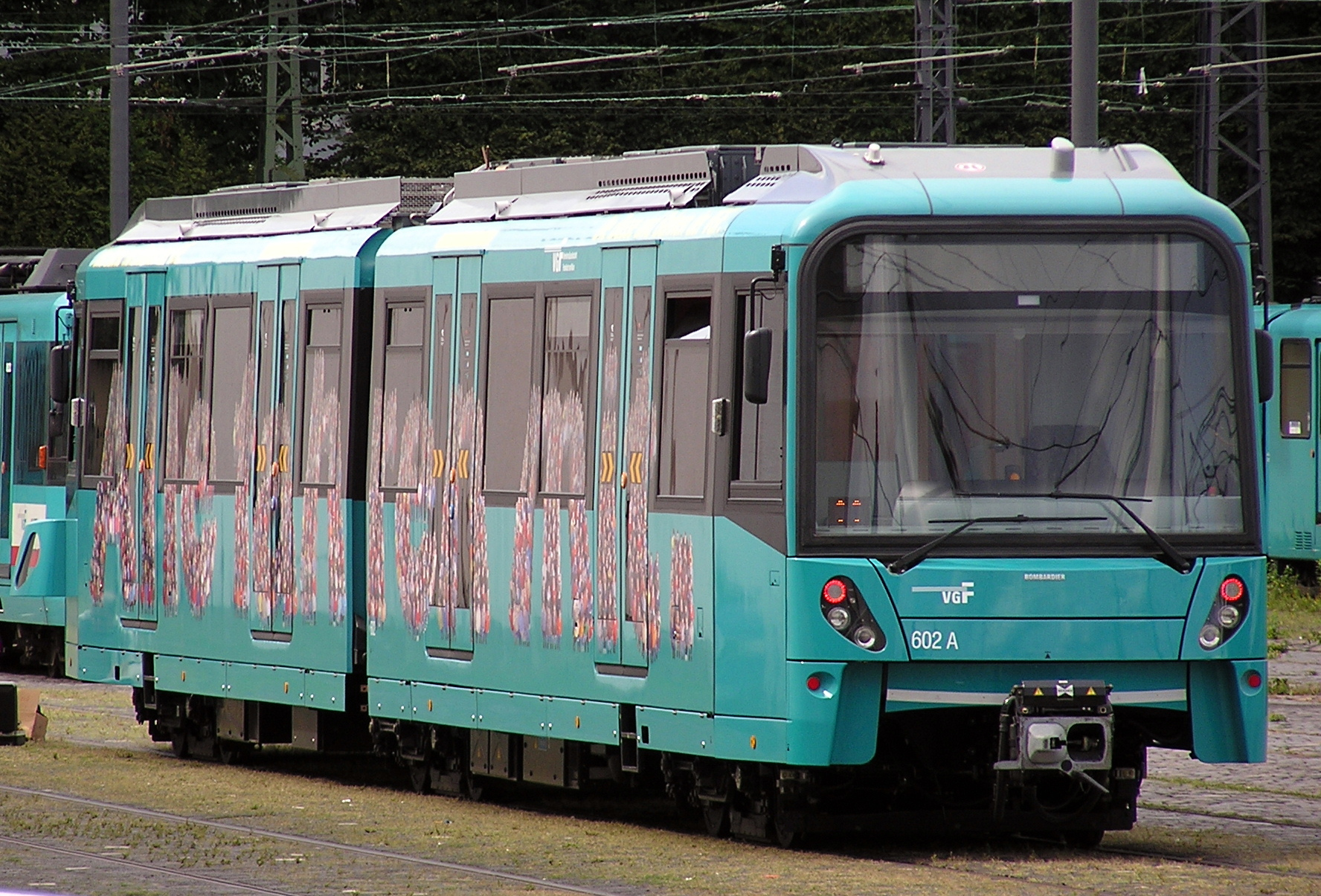
U5 underground train number 602, prior to being transferred to the training facility

FRTC Frankfurt (Fire and Rescue Training Centre, Feuerwehr- und Rettungstrainingscenter) is a firefighting training facility at Eckenheim in Frankfurt am Main, Germany. It is notable for having its own standard gauge rail system and mock-Frankfurt U-Bahn underground station.

Following two years of construction work, the centre opened in 2013 with an "open house" event for the public on 15 June 2013. As of 2019 the facility had been open for six years, and remained one of the most modern in Germany.

The facility additionally offers direct three-year training as a fire fighter.

== Rail system ==
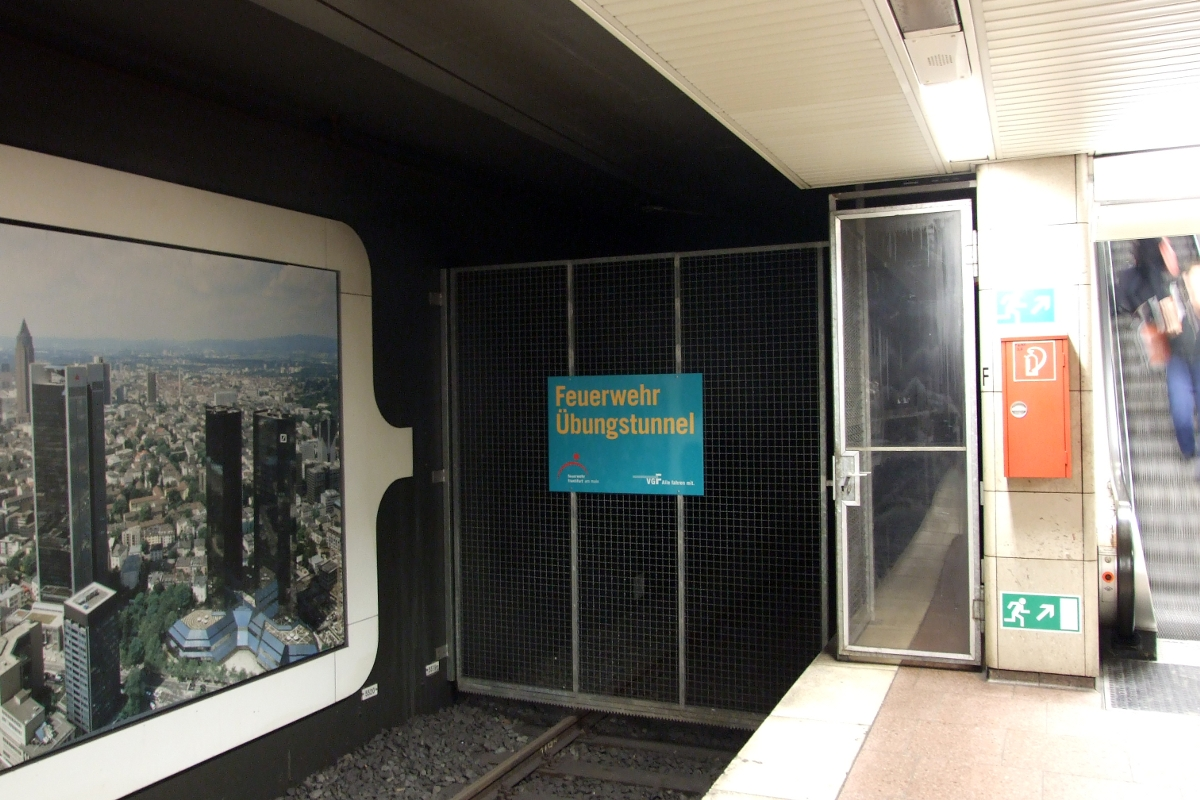
In addition to the FRTC model U-Bahn station, the Fire Brigade also use a section of real underground tunnel at Frankfurt Hbf originally built for U-Bahn Line D

The standard gauge rail system runs north‒south through the facility for 150 metres. The south end is laid as a tramway in a mock-residential area, with a loading dock on the opposite side for industrial training.

In the middle section is a set of points between two S-bends.

Straight on northwards from the set of points is an enclosed building containing the mock-underground station. The U-Bahn station is equipped with real timetables. The station platform signage permanently shows a line U10 departure to Frankfurt (Main) Hauptbahnhof, via Frankfurt Konstablerwache station and Römer.

To the west of the U-Bahn station building is an industrial siding setting and loading dock with overhead line electrification as used on main line rail transport in Germany.

=== Rolling stock ===
As of 2021 two piece of rolling stock were permanently located on the railway system, and can be shunted around depending on the required training scenarios.

A fifth generation Frankfurt U-Bahn U5 train Frankfurt U-Bahn U5 train number 602 is based at the facility. The unit had been damaged during high-water flooding at the manufacturer and was cosmetically restored and stripped of useful parts before being sold to the Frankfurt fire-brigade.

The unit was delivered by VGF to the Messe (Exhibition) U-Bahn station for collection by the fire brigade. During a night-time rescue exercise the fire brigade towed train 602 along U-Bahn Line A to Eckenheim Depot. Road transport was used for the last metres to the training facility.

The second piece of permanent railway stock is a four-wheel railway tank wagon provided by the Deutsche Bahn. The wagon was delivered (free-of-charge) by the Frankfurt harbour railway (Frankfurt City Link Line) to the East Harbour for collection by the fire brigade.
