= Ginnheim =

- Quarter of Frankfurt am Main
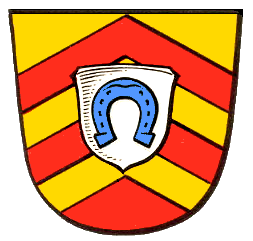
- Coat of arms

- Location of Ginnheim (red) and the Ortsbezirk Mitte-Nord (light red) within Frankfurt am Main
- Interactive map of Ginnheim
- Location within Germany Location within Hesse
- Coordinates: 50°08′25″N 08°38′50″E
- Country: Germany
- State: Hesse
- Admin. region: Darmstadt
- District: Urban district
- City: Frankfurt am Main

Area
  - Total: 2.701 km^{2} (1.043 sq mi)

Population (2020-12-31)
  - Total: 16,826
  - Density: 6,230/km^{2} (16,130/sq mi)
- Time zone: UTC+01:00 (CET)
  - Summer (DST): UTC+02:00 (CEST)
- Postal codes: 60431
- Dialling codes: 069
- Vehicle registration: F
- Website: www.ginnheim.de

Ginnheim (German pronunciation: [ˈɡɪnhaɪm]) is a quarter of Frankfurt am Main, Germany. It is part of the Ortsbezirk Mitte-Nord.

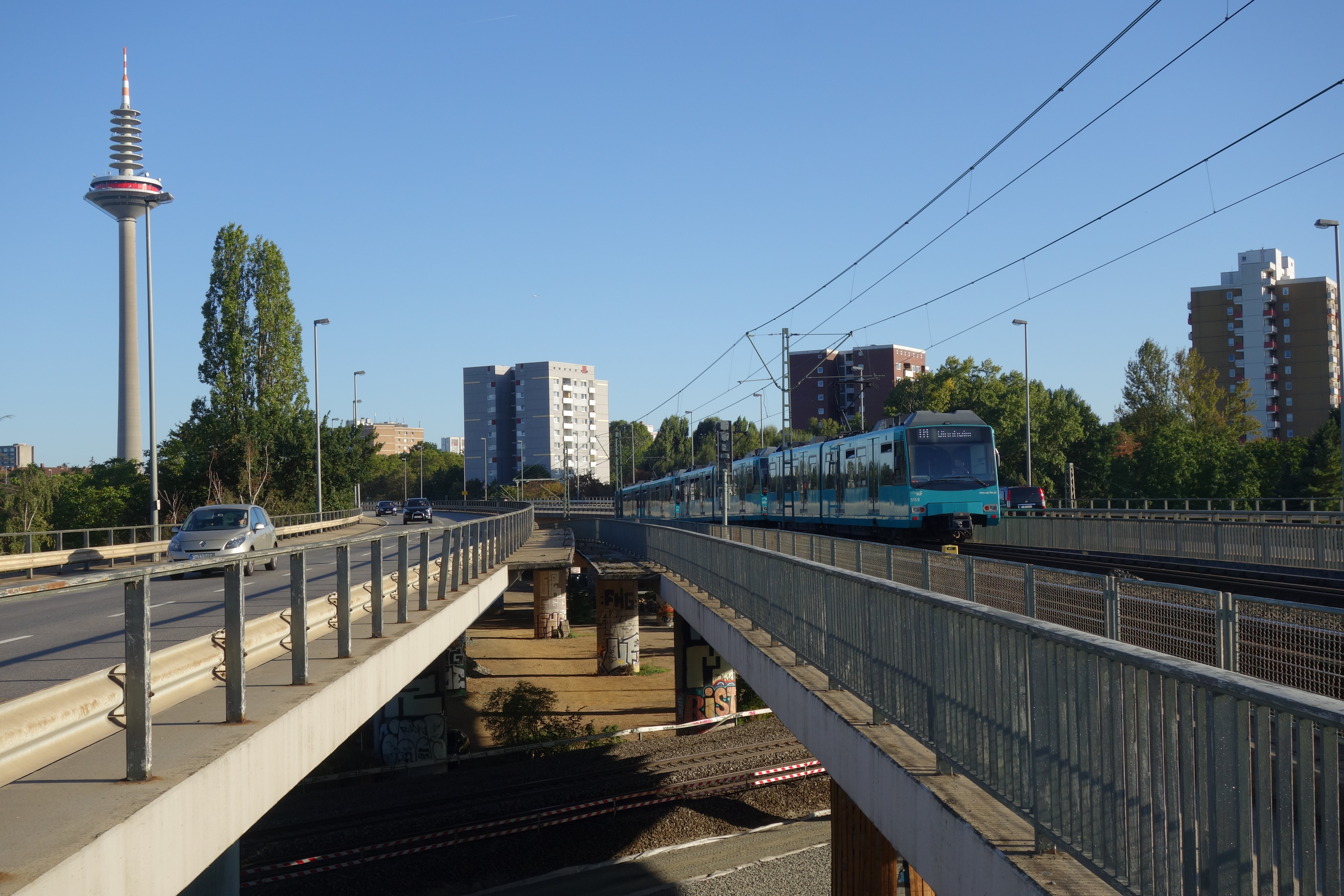
Elevated route for motorway and U1-subway at Rosa-Luxemburg-Straße, facing Ginnheim; Europaturm tower on the left.
