= U-Bahn Line A (Frankfurt U-Bahn) =

North–south main line

The A line is the north-to-south main line of the Frankfurt U-Bahn. It is the oldest and longest line of the U-Bahn system. Served by four routes (U1, U2, U3 and U8) starting at Südbahnhof Railway Station in Sachsenhausen, the A line runs through downtown Frankfurt up to Heddernheim Station in the north of the city, where it branches out to Ginnheim (U1 and U9), Oberursel (U3), Riedberg (U8 and U9) and Bad Homburg (U2). The U9 service between Ginnheim, Riedberg and Nieder-Eschbach does not use the central section and tunnels of the line, making it the only light rail service of the network that does not serve downtown Frankfurt. The Riedberg and Ginnheim branches were planned as parts of the future D line subway but are operationally part of the A line until the D line development and construction is finished.

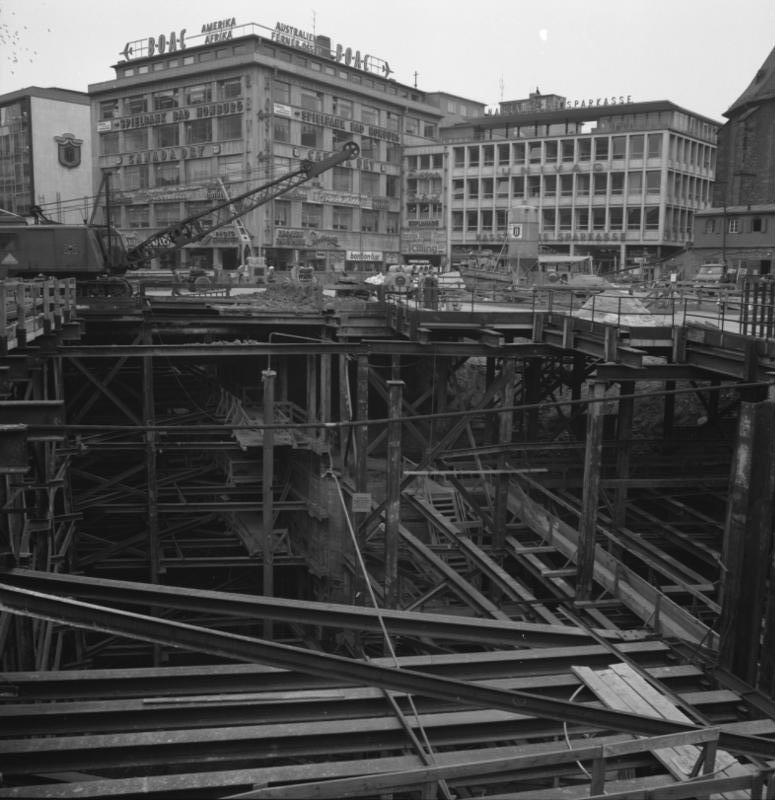
Construction of the Frankfurt U-Bahn

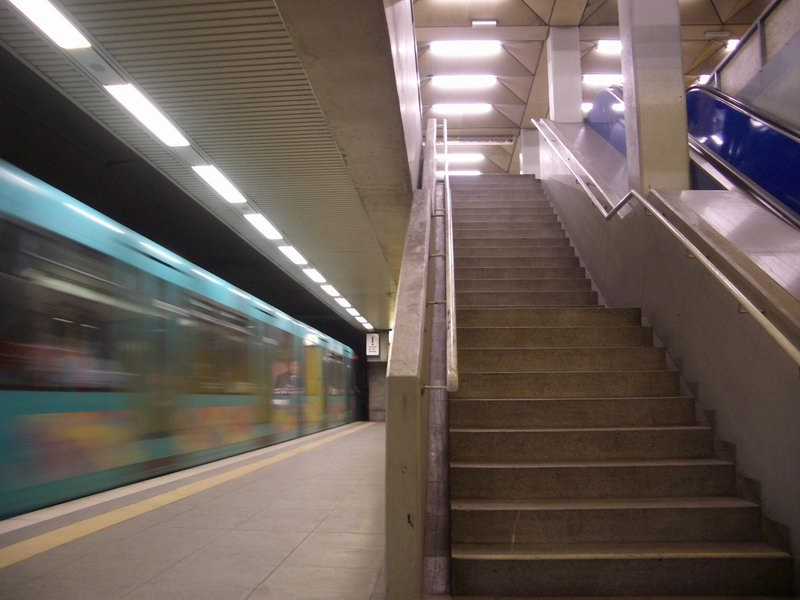
Eschenheimer Tor (Frankfurt U-Bahn)

== History ==
The Line A with its three connecting lines covers about half of the Frankfurt subway network and combines various upgrade standards, linking subway, elevated rail, railway and light rail sections.

The Line A is the most important north–south axis in city traffic and runs from the South Station through the city and the Eschersheimer highway to Heddernheim. There it divides into two branches, which lead to Oberursel (U3) and Bad Homburg (U2). The part of the line served by U1, U2, U3 and U8 has eight underground and six above-ground stops.

The routes to Bad Homburg and Oberursel originally belonged to the Frankfurt Lokalbahn. They run largely off the road network and have barrier-protected level crossings. Also, the piece between Oberursel station and Hohemark is a built according to light rail criteria former narrow-gauge railway line.

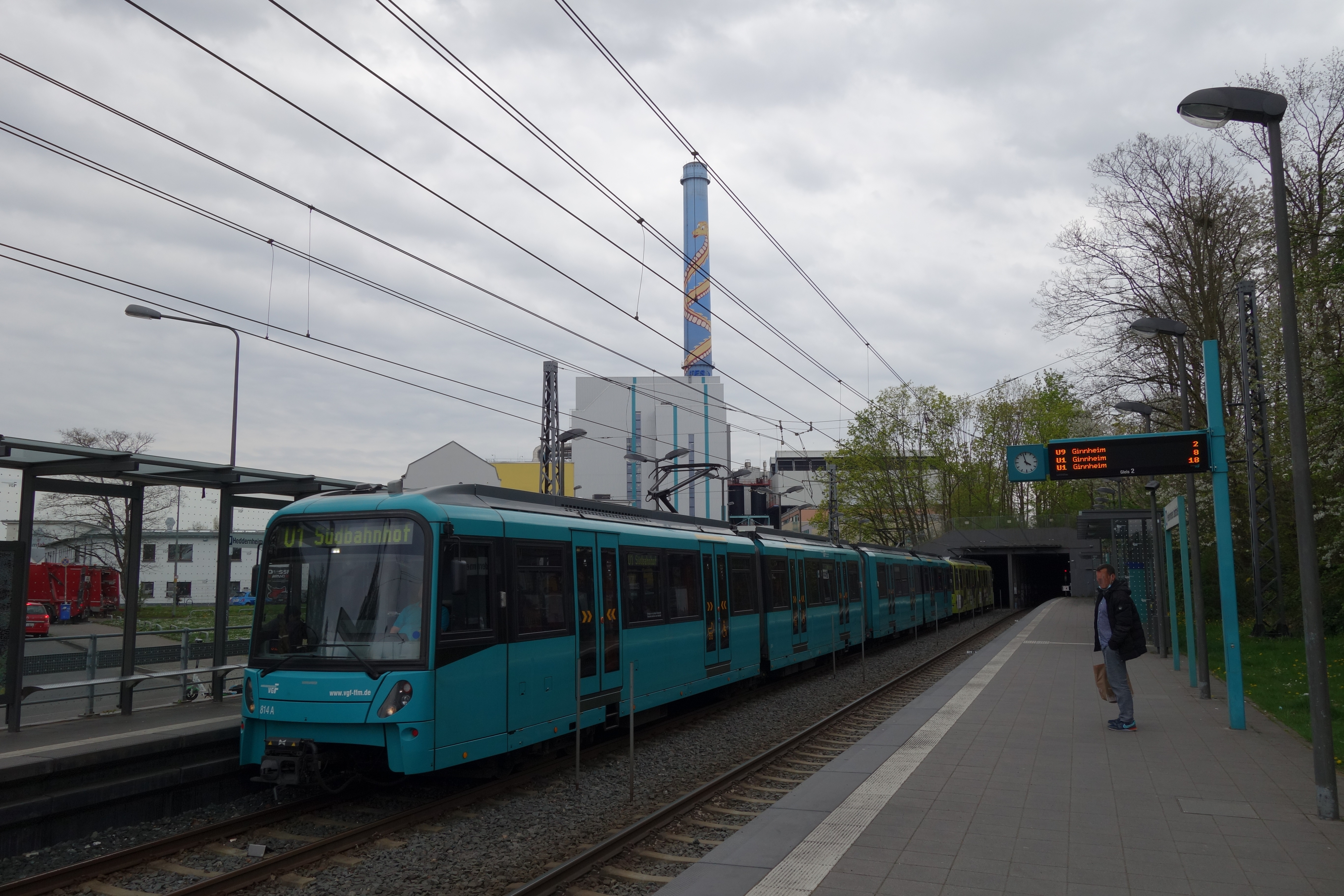
Subway station Heddernheimer Landstraße near the tunnel to the shopping center Nordwestzentrum, incineration plant in the back.

Between the stops Zeilweg and Wiesenau the Oberursel route branches off the subway again (U1) and goes on a newly built, partly underground route through the northwest city to Ginnheim. Between the stops Heddernheimer Landstraße (on the section to Ginnheim) and Wiesenau (on the section to Oberursel) forms a part of the D-route with the two routes a track triangle. In Niederursel, the D route then branches off in the direction of Riedberg.

The construction of the Line A began in 1963. Originally, it was planned to build the line from the city center to Eschersheim to station Weisser Stein in the tunnel. For financial reasons, however, only the southern tunnel section was built and the track north of the Miquelallee led over a ramp to the surface. In the further course the route lies at ground level on the central strip of the Eschersheimer country road. Despite the above-ground routing, the stations were built very complex and had spacious underground distribution bullets, isolated was also the ground-level access by traffic lights possible. For safety reasons, the track tracks were additionally fenced in on both sides; crossing the street has since then only been possible for pedestrians in a few places without traffic lights.

The first route led from the Hauptwache to the northwest city and was opened on October 4, 1968. It had five underground stations in the city center (Hauptwache, Eschenheimer Tor, Grüneburgweg, Holzhausenstraße and Miquel / Adickesallee) and the subterranean terminus Nordweststadt in the same large housing estate. The new service, called A1, drove vehicles of the type U2 (see below). As a depot of the subway served the depot of the municipal tram in Heddernheim. The old storage hall in Eschersheim from the times of the local railway was separated from the track network. The hall is still standing today, even if one no longer recognizes its original use.

At the same time, tram routes 23, 24 and 25 were relocated to the new tunnel. The vehicles of the U-tram services were made "tunnels", that is, they were widening the doors to bridge the gap between (too narrow) vehicle and platform. Unlike the subway, these subway trams did not end at Hauptwache, but returned to the inner city tram network via a ramp in Grosse Gallusstrasse.

From 1968, the following four services operated through the new tunnel:

- U-Bahn
  - A1 Nordweststadt–Hauptwache (from Heddernheim to Hauptwache in Straßenbahnlinien 23 and 26, now U1)
- U-Straßenbahn
  - 25 Bad Homburg–Hauptbahnhof/Heilbronner Straße (then Linie A2, now U2)
  - 24 Oberursel Hohemark–Hauptbahnhof/Pforzheimer Straße (then A3, now U3)
  - 23 Bonames–Neu-Isenburg (ehemalige Linie 8 Heddernheim – Riedhof, then A4).

In 1971, the previous tram route 25 was withdrawn in Bad Homburg to Gonzenheim. The "provisional" terminus of the new subway service A2 has survived until today.

In 1973, the underground was extended in the city center one station to the station Theaterplatz (since 1992 Willy-Brandt-Platz). A transfer station was created after the opening of the first section of the B-line in 1974.

In 1974, the tunnel in the northwest city was extended by one station to the station Römerstadt.

In 1978, the line was extended by an elevated section to the terminus of the tram in Ginnheim. In the same year, the Oberursel route of the former local railway was taken over into the underground network. The two new Taunus lines were now also operated with U2 class cars. The mixed operation with underground tram cars was abandoned, the tunnel ramp in the Great Gallus road shut down, the reinforcement service A4 accounted for. The tunnel-like tram vehicles were rebuilt again for tram operation.

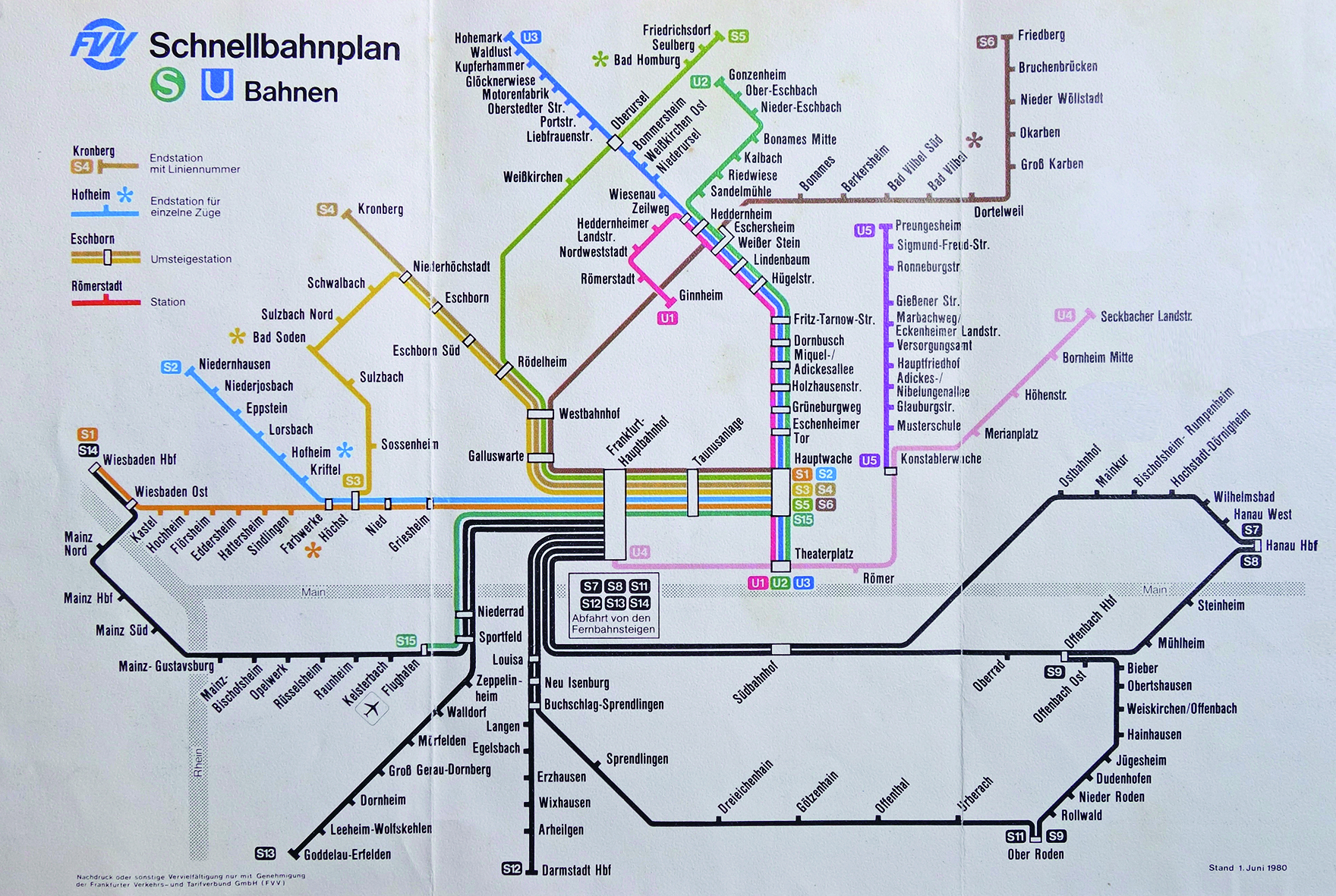
U-Bahn- and S-Bahn-lines in 1980 (yet without Line C)

In 1975, construction began on the southern extension of the A-line under the Main to Sachsenhausen. This section was put into operation on 29 September 1984 and contained two underground stations, Schweizer Platz and Südbahnhof. At Südbahnhof, after the completion of the S-Bahn tunnel under the Main (1990), another interchange between the two high-speed rail networks was built.

With the extension to Sachsenhausen the Line A network reached its extension until 2009. Apart from the merger of two stops and the establishment of a new one in Oberursel as well as the construction of the high station Niddapark to the Federal Horticultural Show 1989 there was no increase here.

In the 1990s and 2000s, construction on the A line was largely limited to matching platform heights. The goal is to bring all platforms to a uniform height of 80 cm above the rail. In the aboveground stations, this was connected to the installation of ground-level entrances (via pedestrian lights). Some stations of the oldest Frankfurt subway line were also renovated and redesigned (such as the stations Grüneburgweg, Heddernheim and northwest center) or provided with lifts (Holzhausenstraße).

On June 30, 2008, the construction of the D-IV section over the Riedberg began. Since the timetable change on December 12, 2010, the new housing development Riedberg has been connected with two new stops via a further branch of the A-line to the city center and to the northwest city. The 12.3-kilometer U8 service operates between Südbahnhof and Riedberg. It operates all stations of the U3 to Niederursel, before turning behind the station to the northeast and after the station Uni-Campus Riedberg reaches the new terminus Riedberg. The 10.3-kilometer U9 service starts at the terminus of the U1 in Ginnheim and travels with it to the station Heddernheimer Landstraße, before turning towards Wiesenau. She then drives together with the U8 to Riedberg and from there continues via Kalbach to Nieder-Eschbach. Between Kalbach and Nieder-Eschbach she travels together with the U2.

In Sachsenhausen, no further construction of the line ending there is to be expected in the coming years. Since 2007 it is planned to end the trains of the U2 service at the so-called Fürsten track in the station Bad Homburg. The route begins at today's terminus in Gonzenheim, which is to be demolished and rebuilt underground to the west of the Gotenstrasse. In place of the previous terminus, the urban railway line is to be lowered into a 350-meter-long tunnel and underpass the railway line Bad Homburg-Friedrichsdorf parallel to the Frankfurter Landstraße. Then they should be introduced to the railway embankment and parallel to the existing railway line on their level the Long Mile and the feeder road with the S-Bahn and the Taunusbahn cross. The planning approval decision was issued in January 2016. Nevertheless, it is unlikely that construction will start soon. According to a FAZ article, "Lord Mayor Alexander Hetjes (CDU) reacted cautiously to the news from Darmstadt. "That means nothing at first," he said, referring to the outstanding financing agreement. "And the Frankfurter Allgemeine Zeitung:" If the planning approval decision becomes final and the financing agreement is in place, the plan is two years ahead of schedule and then two and a half This would mean that construction would start at the earliest in 2018 and completion is not expected before 2020.

== Stretches ==
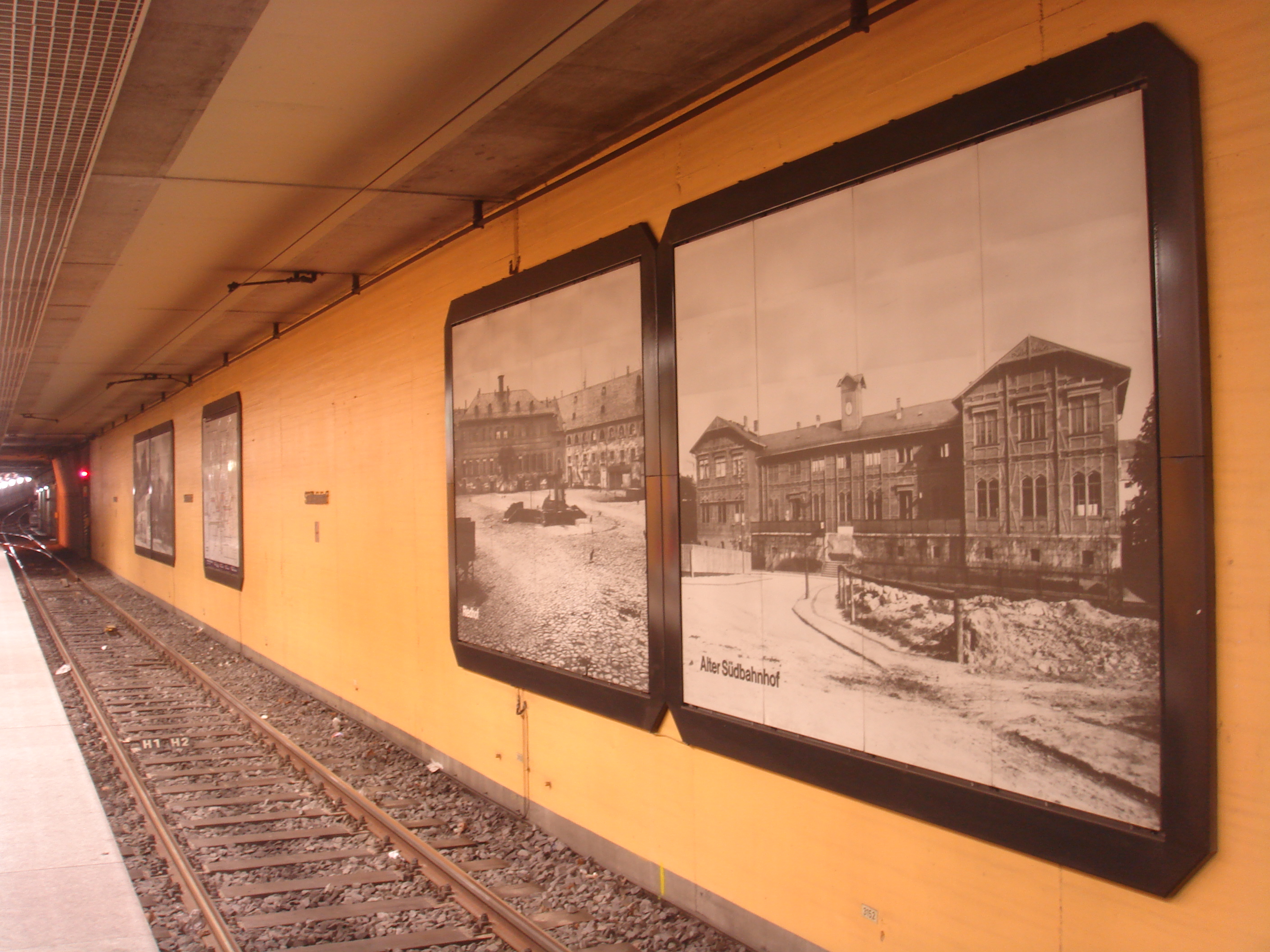
U-Bahn-Gleise im Frankfurt South station for historical photos

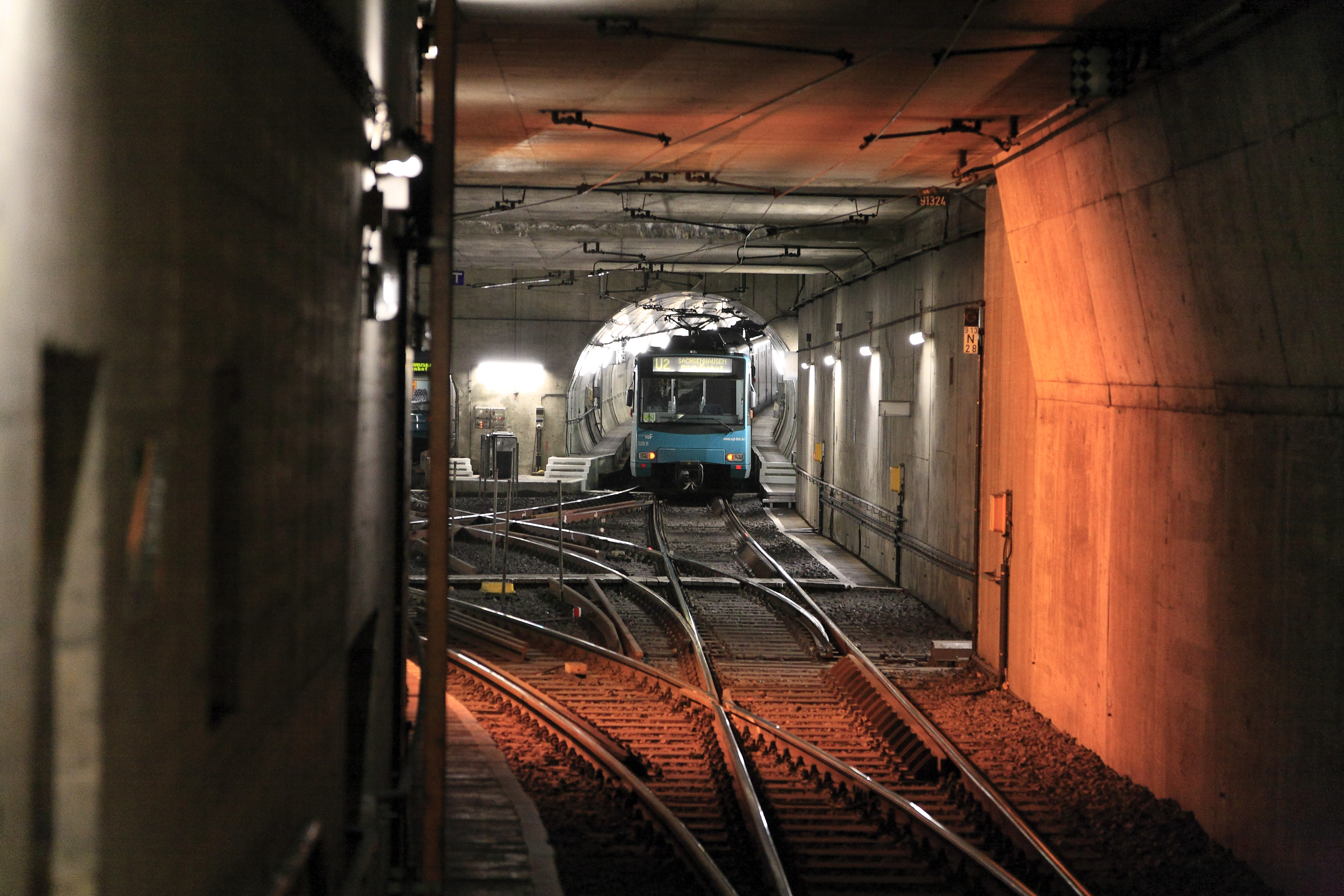
U-Bahn crossover

=== Sachsenhausen ===
The A-line starts at the Südbahnhof in the district of Sachsenhausen. The South Station is an important hub of local and regional transport. Long-distance trains, the regional trains of the Rhein-Main-Verkehrsverbund, the S-Bahn trains to Langen and Darmstadt, city and regional buses as well as the tram routes 14, 15, 16 and 19. The underground platform of the subway lies right under the platforms the railway and offers short transfer routes to the other rail transport. As a terminus of the A-line joins the platform tracks to the south of a three-prong turning and Abstellanlage, the outer tracks were provided for a projected continuation of the route in the direction Sachsenhäuser waiting (see new building projects).

The Südbahnhof is located in a vibrant, inner-city inner-city quarter, which offers retail and gastronomy facilities as well as numerous coveted apartments. The semicircular station forecourt, the Diesterwegplatz, is the center of this quarter and serves several times a week as a marketplace.

The tunnel of the subway runs from the South Station through the Diesterwegstraße to the Swiss Square and crosses the Swiss road there. The next subway station Schweizer Platz is located below the block of houses bordered by Swiss, Schneckenhof, Cranach and Gartenstraße. The Schweizer Platz station was the first station in Frankfurt to be completely mined (that is, without an excavation pit), as the construction of the Schweizer Platz did not permit the otherwise usual excavation without endangering the stability of adjacent buildings. Due to the special design – first the two tubes, then the connection by means of a third tube – conveys the three-aisled, arched platform hall a sacred impression of space and reminiscent of a Romanesque crypt.

The Swiss street, modeled after Paris Boulevard, is the main street of Sachsenhausen with its numerous shops and pubs.

North of it, the subway runs under three blocks, the German Museum of Architecture on Museumsufer and then, just west of the Untermain Bridge, the Main, whose underpass was also associated with very particular difficulties (see Tunneling).

=== City ===
The subway passes, coming from the Main, the Nice and the Jewish Museum, in order to reach the level of the urban stages, the New Mainzer Straße. This North-Main continuation of the Swiss road is the main axis of the Frankfurt financial district, a worth seeing street canyon. Underneath the peace road branching off here is the subway station Willy-Brandt-Platz (until 1992 Theaterplatz). Its southern exit leads to the same, the northern to the imperial square. On Willy-Brandt-Platz can be changed since 1974 to the trains on the B-line, it is the oldest interchange station of the Frankfurt subway. From 1971 to 1984 he was the southern end point of the A-line. Also can be switched to the on the surface tram routes 11 and 12 here.

The route runs from Kaiserplatz through the Kaiserstraße and the Roßmarkt to the Hauptwache. Here, in the city center of modern Frankfurt, meet the A-line, C-section and the city tunnel of the S-Bahn in the rapid transit node Hauptwache. Below the square is an extensive, in Frankfurt usage called B-level shopping and distribution floor. Below is the four-track community station of the C-line and the S-Bahn, even deeper across – in the third basement – finally, the station of the A-line. After opening the Frankfurt subway in 1968, it was until 1971 the southern endpoint of the first Frankfurt subway service, the then A1.

From the Hauptwache a relatively short tunnel leads through the Große Eschenheimer Straße north to the Eschenheimer Tor. When building the U-Bahn station Eschenheimer Tor, it was not only intended to banish public transport but also pedestrians underground to create maximum space on the surface for motor vehicle traffic: the historic square, as early as the early 20th century a large intersection, was to be crossed by passers-by only after the planning of the 1960s by the distribution floor of the station. After a few years, however, ground-level pedestrian crossings were again established.

=== Westend and Nordend ===
The Eschersheimer Landstraße, the main northern arterial road of the city, begins at Eschenheimer Tor. In its first section, it forms the border between the Gründerzeit inner-city districts of Westend and Northrend and is comparatively narrow and winding. Here are three structurally similar subway stations, the stations Grüneburgweg, Holzhausenstraße and Miquel / Adickesallee.

The former station opens the Grüneburgweg, a shopping street in the Westend, and the College of Music and Performing Arts. The station Holzhausenstraße serves the students of the Johann Wolfgang Goethe University on their way to the new Campus Westend in the former I.G. Farben-Haus. At Miquel- / Adickesallee station lies the new police headquarters. During construction of this station, part of a planned motorway tunnel was built as part of the current A 66 ("Alleentunnel") including an underground bus stop. This plan was later abandoned, the piece already built since then serves as a pedestrian tunnel.

The station Miquel- / Adickesallee has a special feature because it was planned and built as the first station. At 95 meters, platform length is five meters shorter than the rest of the stations because it was sized to the length of a four-car train of the prototype U1, which is significantly shorter than the following model series. This leads to the fact that with trains from four railcars starting from the series U3 the last door of the train comes to a stop in the tunnel. On an extension of the platform has been omitted for cost reasons. Instead, the affected door is locked electronically when such a train approaches Miquel / Adickesallee station. Passengers are notified by an automatic announcement.

=== Dornbusch, Eschersheim and Heddernheim ===
Originally, it was planned to build the A-line from the city center to Eschersheim in the tunnel. For financial reasons, however, "only" the southern section of the tunnel was built and the track north of the Miquelallee led to the surface via a ramp. In the further course the route lies as a special railway body at ground level on the central strip of the Eschersheimer country road and on the western edge of the place Am white stone, with seven railroad crossings for vehicle traffic and ten level crossings for pedestrians. The previously existing tram line to Heddernheim was massively expanded and largely separated from the road.

Despite the track on the surface, the stations were built very expensive, until the 1990s, they were only accessible via spacious subterranean distribution bullets. The track tracks were also fenced on both sides; Crossing the road has since been possible for pedestrians only in a few places. The districts Dornbusch and Eschersheim are in fact cut in two halves, the guidance of the subway on the road led to numerous serious accidents with motor vehicles and pedestrians. However, the urban planning and operationally very unsatisfactory situation can not be remedied for the foreseeable future, as an extension of the tunnel is currently considered unfeasible.

The Eschersheimer Landstraße is an accident focus dar (data, action, response). In many cases, train users also run at red or off the pedestrian crossings to the platforms. From 1968 to 2010, 32 people died there. For years, therefore, leadership in the extended subway tunnel worked to increase security.

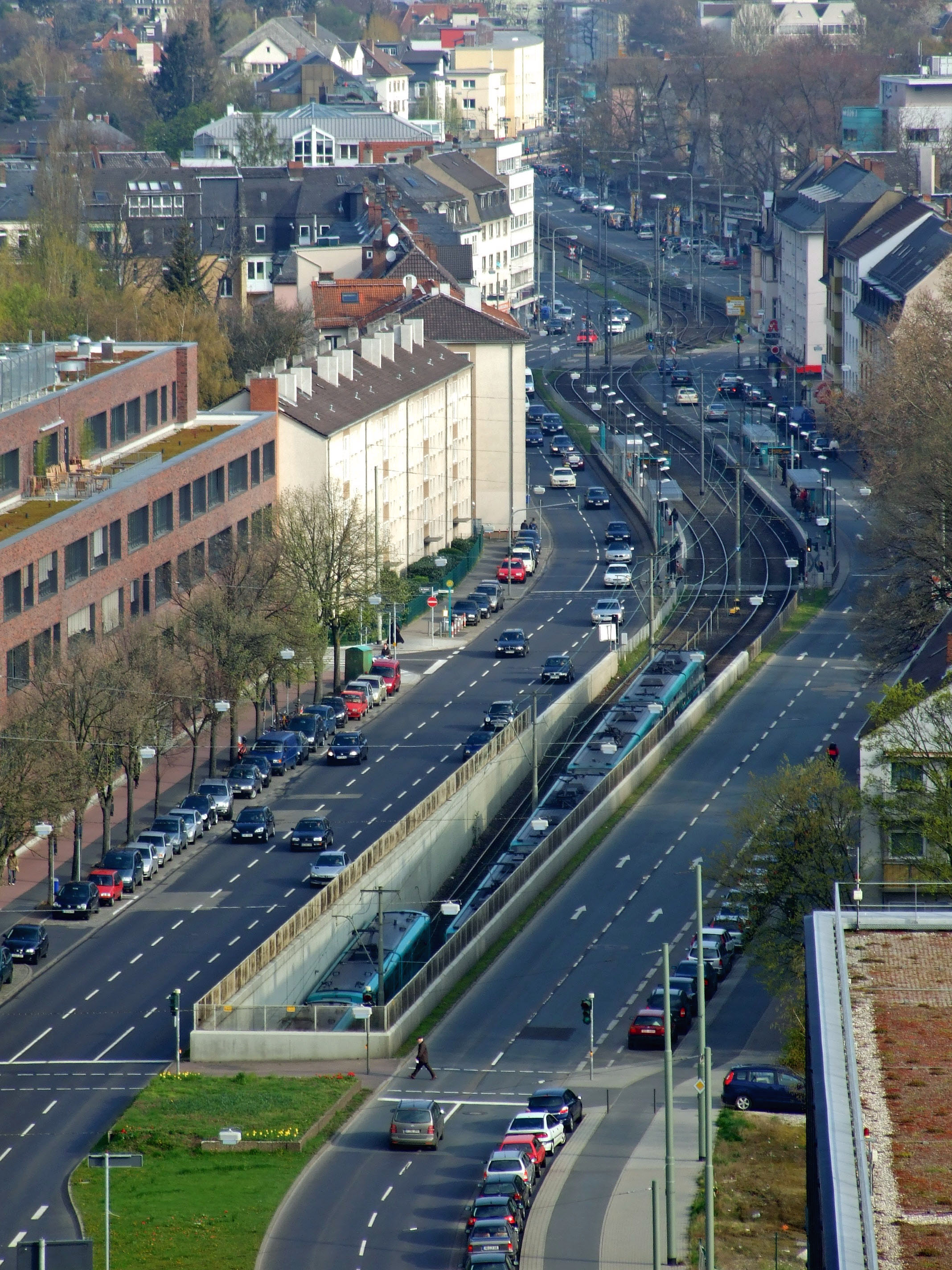
Tunnel portals

In the 1960s and 1970s, some underpasses were created to allow pedestrians to safely cross the street. One of them was artistically designed in 1992 by the Frankfurt architect Christoph Mäckler under the title "subway underpass". The underpass is clad with bricks, which results in a different surface appearance depending on the location.

The tunnel ramp on Humser Straße is designed so that the route can continue without problems in the tunnel. For this purpose, the ramp was built on steel stilts, which can be removed if necessary. However, this "provisional" tunnel end is still in operation today.

At the end of the tunnel, follow the stations Dornbusch, Fritz-Tarnow-Straße, Hügelstraße, Lindenbaum and Weißer Stein. North of the station Dornbusch branches off to the east from a largely single-track, street-level operating route, which connects the A-line with the U-tram line served by the U5 and the Wagenhalle corner home.

In Eschersheim, the line north of the station Steiner Stein first crosses the terrain cut, in which the Main-Weser-Bahn (S-Bahn service S6) runs, and then on the Maybach bridge on the Nidda to Heddernheimer shore sink. The metro route is run as a single bridge between the two lanes of the road, so that they can switch from the middle to the side position on the Heddernheimer side under the northern directional lane as an independent railway body. The following station Heddernheim is located at ground level north of the road. The station is three-pronged, because it is the terminus for individual trains. Immediately to the west of the station is the depot Heddernheim, where the vehicles of the A-line are located.

== Tunnels ==
During the construction of the tunnels for subway line A, different methods were used over the years. The easiest way was the construction of the section in the northwest city, since here the subway line had been taken into account as planned and was built together with the other buildings. The first phase of construction (Alleenring Hauptwache) and its later extension to Theaterplatz (now Willy-Brandt-Platz) were still completely open-plan. For this purpose, a correspondingly deep excavation pit was dug and secured with the aid of numerous steel girders and screed walls driven into the ground (Berliner Verbau).

The Main underpass required new techniques for the first time. It came up with the idea to freeze the environment of the tunnel to be created. However, there were significant problems due to strong groundwater currents. Likewise, the exploitation of the ice did not proceed as planned after the tunnel was built, causing it to deform due to the high pressure.

In the Sachsenhausen area, although the Südbahnhof could again be built in an open design, but it had to be demolished for the station hall of the South Station. In the area of Schweizer Straße and Schweizer Platz, the use of an open construction method was impossible because of the narrow development. Here, once on the Line A, a whole station had to be mined by the Schweizer Platz station. In some areas, groundwater had to be ground-sealed with groundwater-neutral chemicals before construction began, as some of the foundations of houses were too close to the plants to be constructed. Initially, the two tubes, in which the track is located, were connected with a third tube in the station area. The northern exit is made by a cross-tube also made by mining.

Due to the forced abandonment of an open construction method, other tunnel construction techniques such as shield tunneling and the new Austrian tunnel construction method were used alongside the icing for the first time on the Line A.

A designation from the construction planning and time of the tunnel has survived to this day: the "B-level". The different levels were designated in the plans with letters (ground surface A, first basement B, etc.), according to plan the Line A of the subway at Hauptwache reverses in the D-level, the S-Bahn and the Line C. Line of the subway (U6, U7) in the C-plane. While the other names, with the exception of the buttons of the subsequently installed elevators, have disappeared, the term "B-level" has remained in common usage until today.

== Services ==
The Line A can be divided into five sections, which are used by the four services U1, U2, U3 and U8. All services start at the Südbahnhof and use the common inner-city trunk line to Heddernheim. Here, the track divides into four branches that run over the northwest city to Ginnheim (U1), over Bonames and Nieder-Eschbach to Gonzenheim (U2), Oberursel to Hohemark (U3) and since 2010 via a connecting link to Riedberg (U8), Basically, this is a single route that branches into three branches in the northern outskirts with a connection between the middle and the eastern branch.

The U1 operates as the oldest Frankfurt subway service since 1968, until 1978 under the name "A1". The U2 to Bad Homburg wore from 1910 to 1971 as the overland tram of the Frankfurt local train route number 25, then she operated until 1978 as the subway service "A2". The Oberurseler route, today driven by line U3, operated from 1910 to 1971 as tram route 24, then until 1978 as subway service "A3". In addition, operated from 1910 to 1971 on the Homburger branch a reinforcing route 23 from the city to Bonames, from 1971 to 1978 as "A4". Since the end of 2010, the new U8 service connects the district of Riedberg with the city center.

Due to the forced abandonment of an open construction method, other tunnel construction techniques such as shield tunneling and the new Austrian tunnel construction method were used alongside the icing for the first time on the A line.

A designation from the construction planning and time of the tunnel has survived to this day: the "B-level". The different levels were designated in the plans with letters (ground surface A, first basement B, etc.), according to plan the A-line of the subway at Hauptwache reverses in the D-level; the S-Bahn and the C-line of the subway (U6, U7) in the C-level. While the other names, with the exception of the buttons of the subsequently installed elevators, have disappeared, the term "B-level" has remained in common usage until today.

Officially, the line A is not subdivided according to the route, but according to construction sections. The sections of the trunk line are numbered with Roman numerals. The connection routes have Arabic numbers, whereby the distance to the Riedberg officially belongs to the D-distance.

Part of the main line	A V	Neu-Isenburg – Frankfurt Südbahnhof	Realization not foreseeable
Part of the main line	A IV	South Station – Untermainkai	in operation U1, U2, U3, U8
Part of the main line	A II	Untermainkai – Willy-Brandt-Platz – Kaiserstraße	in operation U1, U2, U3, U8; the lot partially belonged to B I
Part of the main line	A I	(Ramp Große Gallusstraße -) Hauptwache – ramp Humser Straße	Ramp Gross Gallusstraße closed down; remaining track in operation U1, U2, U3, U8
Part of the main line	A III	Ramp Humser Strasse – White Stone	operating at the surface U1, U2, U3, U8; Tunneling no longer desired
Part of the trunk line and connecting route	A 1	White Stone – Heddernheim – Nordwestzentrum – Ginnheim	in operation; to Heddernheim U1, U2, U3, U8, Heddernheim to Gleisdreieck Niederursel U1, U3, U8, from Gleisdreieck Niederursel U1, U9
Connecting section	A 3	Gleisdreieck Niederursel – Oberursel – Hohemark	in operation U3
(Part of the D-stretch)		Riedberg clasp	in operation U8, U9
Connecting section	A 2	Heddernheim – Gonzenheim – Bad Homburg Bahnhof	to Nieder-Eschbach in operation U2, U9, until Gonzenheim in operation U2, from Gonzenheim in planning

=== U1 ===
U1

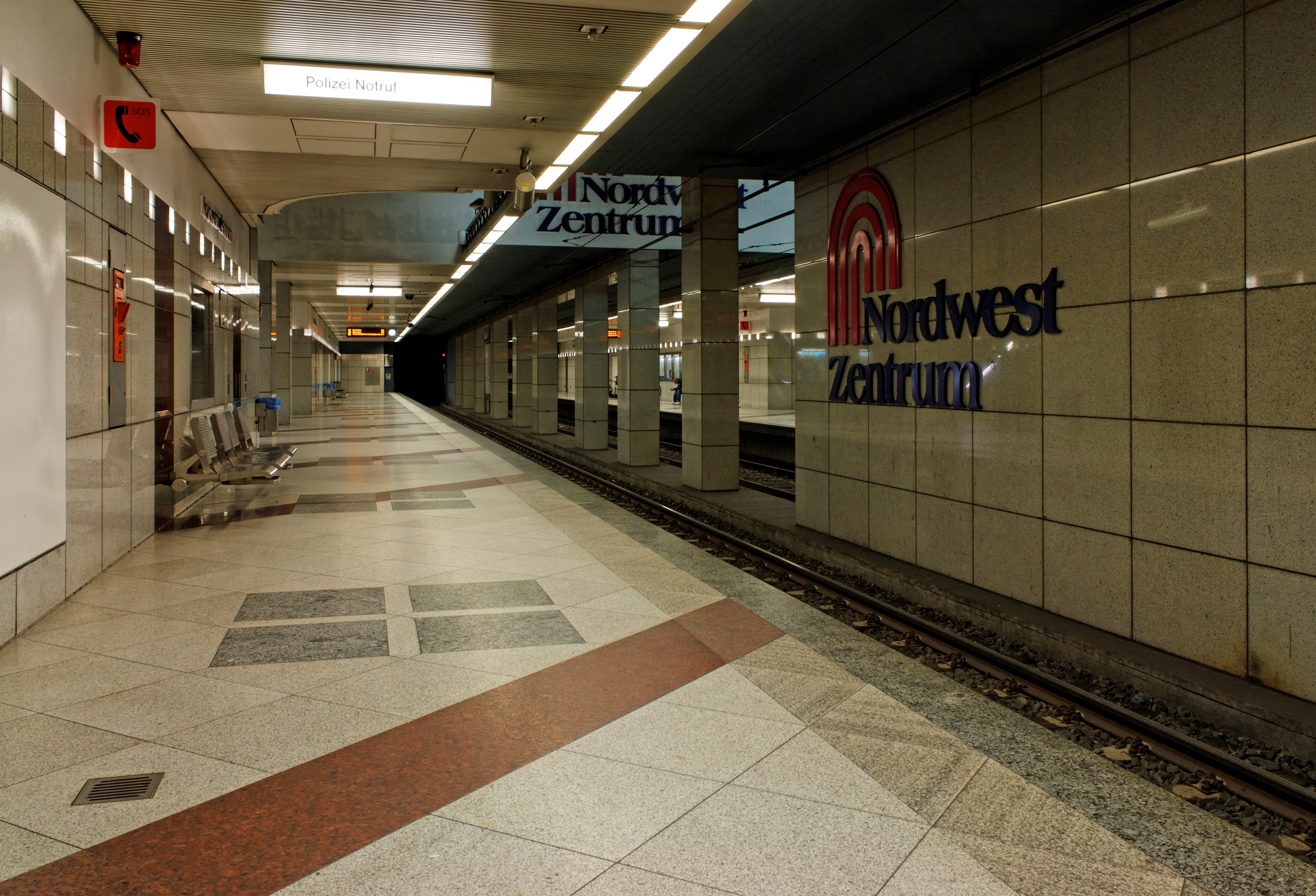
- U1 station Nordwestzentrum

Overview
- Status: Operational
- Owner: Verkehrsgesellschaft Frankfurt
- Locale: Frankfurt am Main
- Termini: Frankfurt South station; Ginnheim
- Stations: 20

Service
- Type: Rapid transit
- System: Frankfurt U-Bahn
- Services: A IV, A II, A I, A III, A 1
- Operator(s): Verkehrsgesellschaft Frankfurt
- Depot(s): Heddernheim
- Rolling stock: U5-Triebwagen

History
- Opened: 4 October 1968

Technical
- Line length: 12.3 km (7.6 mi)
- Track gauge: 1,435 mm (4 ft 8 1/2 in) standard gauge
- Electrification: Overhead line
Route map

The U1 is a service on the Frankfurt U-Bahn. When the service was introduced in 1968, it ran from the south railway station to the Hauptwache and then continued along the Eschersheimer Landstrasse all the way up to Heddernheim and then continued to their terminus in Ginnheim.

The branch from Heddernheim to Ginnheim is also served by the U1 and between the Heddernheimer Landstraße and Ginnheim stations by the U9 belonging to the D-line. In contrast to the two branches of the U2 and U3 services, this section was rebuilt from the start as a subway, while the other two emerged from overland trams. It was part of the first Frankfurt subway line, which led from 1968 from the Hauptwache in the early 1960s built large housing estate northwest city.

The route of the U1 branches off at the Heddernheimer Station Zeilweg from the Oberurseler route to the south, where it meets with the Riedberg coming section of the route. It runs some 100 meters east parallel to Rosa-Luxemburg-Straße, a city highway, which owes its existence as the U1 the connection of the northwest city. On the interrupted by the highway Heddernheimer highway is the same metro station. It opens up the northern part of the large housing estate, the quarter "Wiesenau". The station was heavily drawn to its completed in April 2010 renovation by decades of vandalism.

Immediately on the southern platform of the train begins the subway tunnel under the northwest city. At first, it passes under Rosa-Luxemburg-Straße at an acute angle and leads underground to the subway station Nordwestzentrum. The northwestern center was originally not designed as a closed shopping mall, but as the center of the northwest city, and in addition to numerous shops also included many social facilities and a campus of the University of Applied Sciences Frankfurt. The current operator, who even took care of the refurbishment of the subway station, turned the northwest center into a large shopping center, and today its catchment area extends far beyond the northwest city. In addition to the subway station, there is also a bus station in the northwest center, which is located within the building complex.

South of the station, the tunnel swings back to the axis of Rosa-Luxemburg-Straße and ends after about 600 meters on the median strip of the city highway. Directly at the exit of the tunnel is the subway station Römerstadt, named after the settlement Römerstadt, built by Ernst May on the site of the ancient city of Nida. South of the Hadrianstraße the Stadtbahn passes over a concrete area, which is partly used as a parking lot. From here begins a path that leads from the subway station to the nearby Niddapark. The railway bridge also moves closer to the Rosa-Luxemburg-Straße, as it has to pass a former air raid shelter there. After the bunker ends, the bridge and the light rail lead together with the Rosa-Luxemburg-Straße on a railway embankment.

On the railway embankment there is a turning facility between the railway tracks to Ginnheim. The western track is 155 meters long, so here six railcars can be parked in a row. The eastern track is only 105 meters long and thus designed for only four railcars. Here, mainly individual courses of the U1 service are parked, which are no longer needed in the late hours. The turning system is normally no longer used for turning after the extension to Ginnheim, with the exception of two cases: on the one hand in the section Römerstadt → Ginnheim, on the other hand if the U3 the section Wiesenau → Heddernheim can not use. Behind the turning plant ends the earth dam and the metropolitan railway passes on a bridge the Nidda. The bridge also spans the south of the Nidda lying street "Am Ginnheimer grove", which then flows onto the Rosa-Luxemburg-Straße.

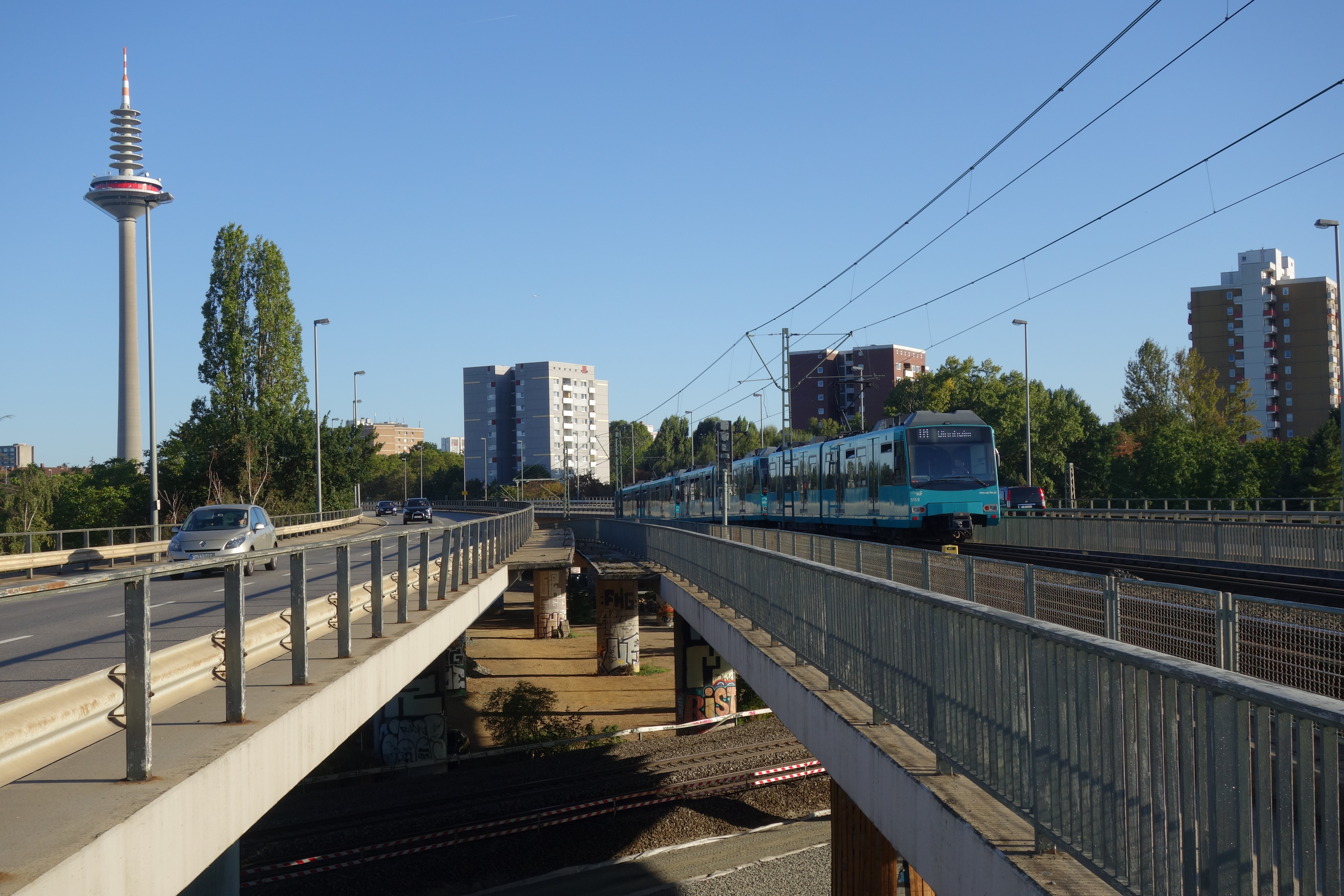
Common route for motorway and subway at Rosa-Luxemburg-Straße, facing Ginnheim; Europaturm tower on the left.

Now the light rail is again on a railway embankment along with the Rosa-Luxembourg-road through the Niddapark. The route runs through the Niddapark, a public park created after the 1989 Federal Garden Show. The then built station, which lies on the edge of the railway embankment, opens up the park. Due to the low passenger usage in the evenings and lack of social control, the station, afflicted by countless vandals, today offers a sad image. Originally there was a lift at Niddapark station that led from the road to the distributor level, as well as two inclined lifts leading to the platforms. Due to strong vandalism damage, the elevators were shut down in the 1990s.

The city highway then crosses the Main-Weser-Bahn and the district Ginnheim, the elevated railway thread here to the south and finally reaches its ground-level terminus Ginnheim. It is also the terminus of the coming from the south tram route 16, which meets here with the U1 and the U9 and shares a five-track community station. From the mezzanine of the Niddapark metro station, you can reach a footpath that leads along the metro to Ginnheim. The entire section from the Römerstadt train station to Ginnheim is the only section of the surface completely developed according to metro criteria.

=== U2 ===
U2

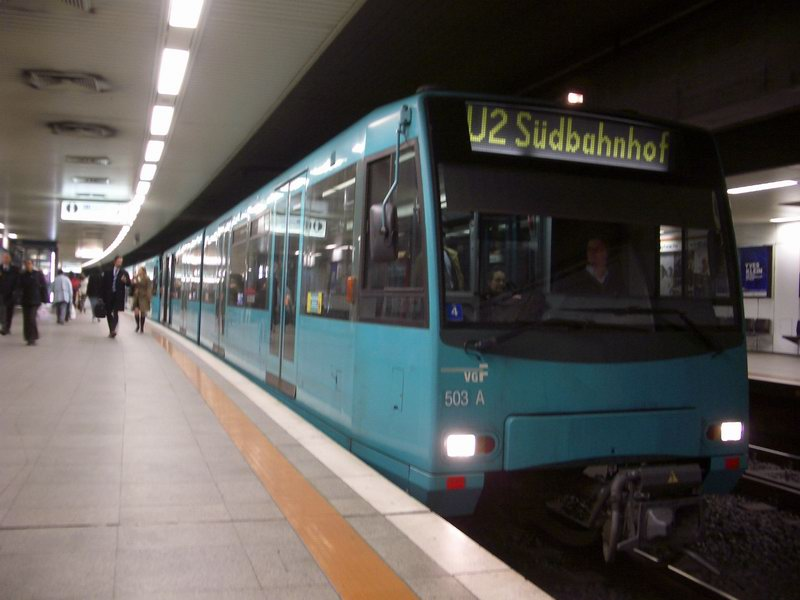
- U2 at Hauptwache station

Overview
- Status: Operational
- Owner: Verkehrsgesellschaft Frankfurt
- Locale: Frankfurt am Main, Bad Homburg
- Termini: Frankfurt South station; Bad Homburg-Gonzenheim
- Stations: 21

Service
- Type: Rapid transit
- System: Frankfurt U-Bahn
- Services: A IV, A II, A I, A III, A 1, A 2
- Operator(s): Verkehrsgesellschaft Frankfurt
- Depot(s): Heddernheim
- Rolling stock: U5-Triebwagen

History
- Opened: 4 October 1968

Technical
- Line length: 16.6 km (10.3 mi)
- Track gauge: 1,435 mm (4 ft 8 1/2 in) standard gauge
- Electrification: Overhead line
Route map

The U2 is a service on the Frankfurt U-Bahn. At the time of the service's inauguration in 1968, it ran from the south railway station to the Hauptwache and then continued along the Eschersheimer Landstrasse all the way up to Heddernheim and then continued to their terminus in Bad Homburg.

The leading to Gonzenheim, driven by the U2 Streckenast is older than the Frankfurt subway. He emerged from an overland section of the Frankfurt local railway, which connected Heddernheim and Bad Homburg since 1910. Bad Homburg also had from 1899 to 1935 its own tram network, which was connected via the local railway with the Frankfurt network. The local railway used in Frankfurt and Homburg along the street-level tracks of urban trams, the intermediate part was traced in the manner of a railroad independent of the road network. The local railway lines were actually not licensed as a tram, but as a small train.

The former Homburger Lokalbahn line used today by the U2 begins at Heddernheim station with the aforementioned depot and turns north. On the edge of the former factory premises of the 1982 closed United German metal works the route leads along the Olof-Palme-Straße to the north. The stations Sandelmühle and Riedwiese open up here since 1987 as Mertonviertel residential and commercial area. At Marie-Curie-Straße, the route swings in an easterly direction, crosses below the Riedberg A 661 and then runs through undeveloped terrain. There it meets with the route of the U9 to the Riedberg and leads up to the quarter Bonames, in which the stations Kalbach and Bonames middle lie.

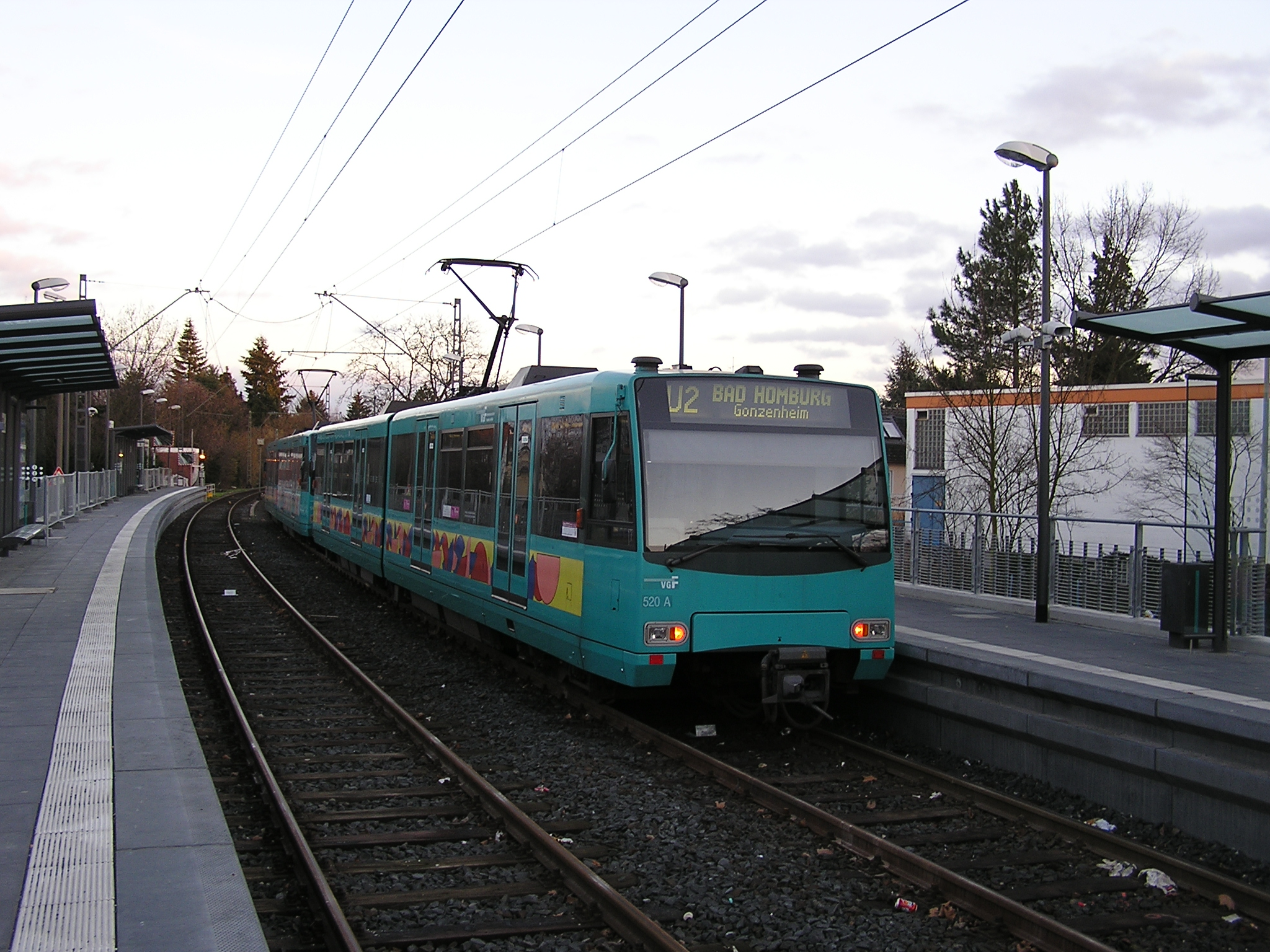
Terminus Gonzenheim

After the railroad crossing Homburger Landstraße immediately after the station Bonames Mitte lies on the right hand side the Friedrich-Fauldrath-Anlage, which is a relic of the former tram turning loop. Then the route follows for a short stretch of Steinernen Straße, a historic main street from Mainz into the Wetterau, and then turns towards Nieder-Eschbach, the last district before the city limits. Nieder-Eschbach has a turning facility and since its conversion to automatic operation has been the terminus for a number of trains, as only one in two trains runs to Gonzenheim in the slower traffic times.

Between Nieder-Eschbach and Ober-Eschbach, the route crosses the A5, which follows here approximately the city boundary between Frankfurt and Bad Homburg. Around the station Ober-Eschbach emerged in recent years, a densified residential area, which exploits the convenient transport links. The following station Gonzenheim has been the terminus of the Homburger line since the changeover to subway operation. The formerly from here in the Homburg city center continuing tram line led through narrow city streets, in which a subway operation on the surface was not possible. The terminus is one of the many long-term temporaries of the Frankfurt subway, because since its commissioning in 1971 is planned to extend the U2. This is partly due to objections from the residents, partly due to concerns of the FVV because of parallel traffic; A tour of the tunnel was opposed by the high construction and operating costs.

Since 2012 the planning approval procedure for the further construction runs. The new route is to begin about 200 meters before today's final stop with a ramp to which a 350-meter long single-track tunnel between the portals Erlenweg and Gotenstraße connects. The Gonzenheim stop will be moved 200 meters to the west and lie in a low position in the future. At the western end of the tunnel will pass under the Homburger Bahn in a tight turn. West of the railway crossing, the route climbs in a trough structure, crosses the Dornbach and the Lange Meile and then runs parallel to the railway to the station Bad Homburg, where the U2 will end at track 301. The entire new line is 1646 meters long, of which 550 meters single track

=== U3 ===
U3

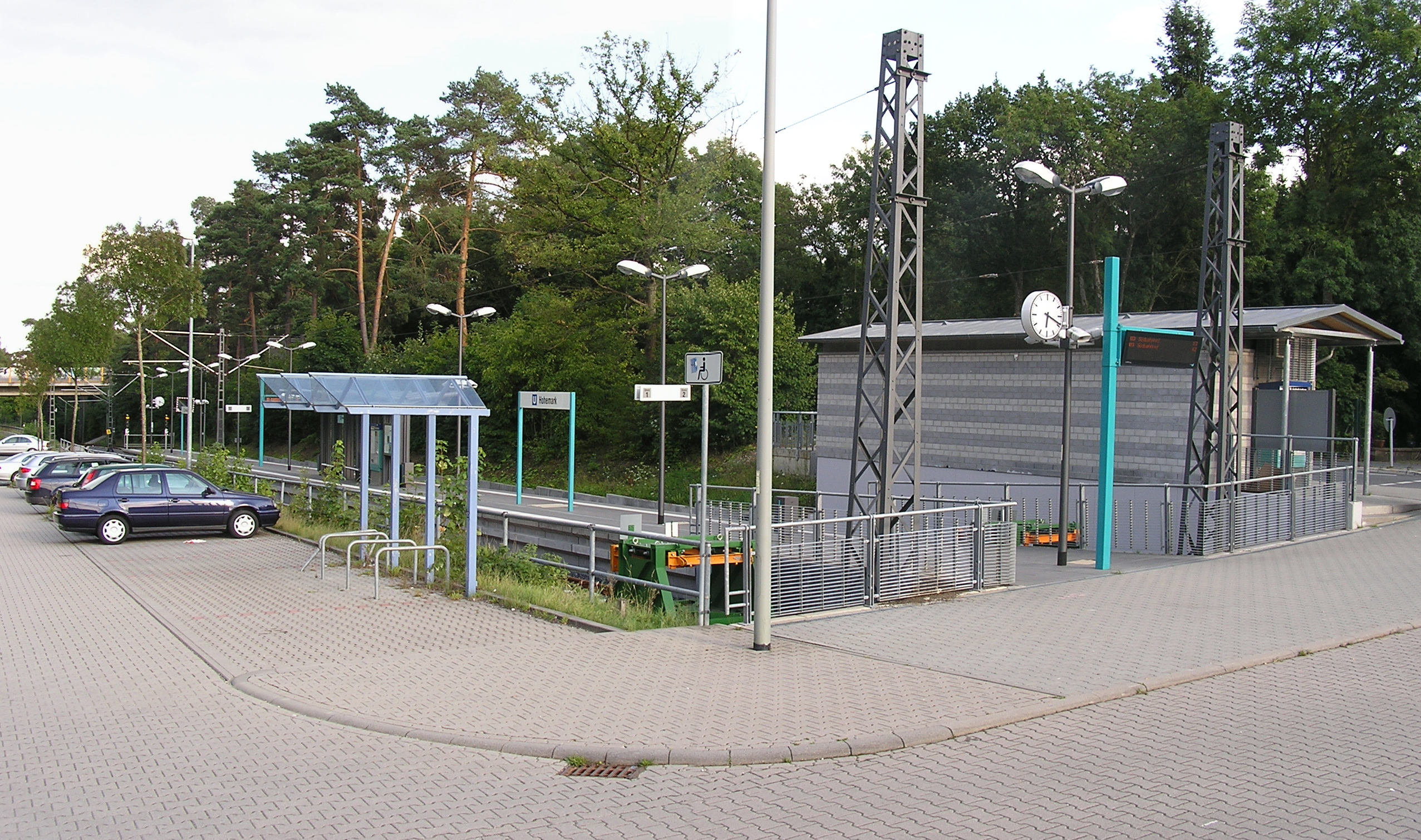
- Terminus Hohemark station

Overview
- Status: Operational
- Owner: Verkehrsgesellschaft Frankfurt
- Locale: Frankfurt am Main, Oberursel
- Termini: Frankfurt South station; Hohemark
- Stations: 28

Service
- Type: Rapid transit
- System: Frankfurt U-Bahn
- Services: A IV, A II, A I, A III, A 1, A 3
- Operator(s): Verkehrsgesellschaft Frankfurt
- Depot(s): Heddernheim
- Rolling stock: U5-Triebwagen

History
- Opened: 4 October 1968

Technical
- Line length: 19.3 km (12.0 mi)
- Track gauge: 1,435 mm (4 ft 8 1/2 in) standard gauge
- Electrification: Overhead line
Route map

The U3 is a service on the Frankfurt U-Bahn. At the time of the services's inauguration in 1968, it ran from the south railway station to the Hauptwache and then continued along the Eschersheimer Landstrasse all the way up to Heddernheim and then continued to their terminus in Oberursel.

The U3 has also begun running from the Frankfurt tunnel. The connection between Heddernheim and the state station, Oberursel, at the Homburger course was opened in 1910. The mountain railway, beginning from the stationo Oberursel began in 1899. Both routes are today, after numerous modifications, are part of Frankfurt U-Bahn.

The Oberurseler stretch leads from the railway station Heddernheim in a westerly direction. After about one kilometer, the line used by the U1 opened in 1968 branches off to the south. The railway, formerly used by industrial areas and undeveloped terrain, today leads through a residential area that originated as part of the Merton area in the early 1990s. Near the station Zeilweg is a well-known kindergarten designed by the Austrian artist Friedensreich Hundertwasser. The railway crosses the Rosa-Luxemburg-Straße and follows the valley of the Urselbach. Here are the stations Wiesenau and Niederursel. After the Niederursel station, the route branches off the U8 and U9 to Riedberg. After that, it passes under the A 5 and follows in a lateral position to the side of the Frankfurter Landstraße. At the junction of Kurmainzer Straße is the station Weißkirchen East, which is already on Oberurseler urban area, at the confluence of the Bommersheimer Straße the station Bommersheim.

From the station Oberursel the route runs on a special railway body through Oberursel, first along the Berliner Straße (station Oberursel city center), then from the station Oberursel old town along the Hohemarkstraße. The railway line and the stations Lahnstraße, Glöcknerwiese and copper hammer are located south of the road, then it changes to the northern side of the road. The last section with the stops Rosengärtchen and Waldlust is single-tracked, the terminus Hohemark again double-tracked. Here, at the beginning of the Taunus Nature Park, there is a large park-and-ride area next to the station. The former turning loop was closed in 1986 and dismantled. Until the Hessentag 2011, all platforms were converted, usable for three-car trains of 75 m in length and a platform height of 80 cm. The new U5 railcars were first used on this route.

=== The connecting U8 and U9 ===
U8

- Network symbol

Overview
- Owner: RMV
- Stations: 19

Service
- System: Frankfurt U-Bahn
- Services: 04:20 AM – 11:50 PM; Every 15 min. (RH); Every 15 min. (MD); Every 30 min. (N)
- Operator(s): Stadtwerke Frankfurt
- Rolling stock: U5-Triebwagen

History
- Opened: 2010

Technical
- Line length: 12.1 km (7.5 mi); 25 minutes (avg.)
- Operating speed: 29 km/h (18 mph) average
- Average inter-station distance: 637 m (2,090 ft)

The U8 is a service on the Frankfurt U-Bahn. At the time of the service's inauguration in 2010, it ran from the south railway station to the Hauptwache and then continued along the Eschersheimer Landstrasse all the way up to Heddernheim and then continued to their terminus in Riedberg.

The connecting link between the Oberurseler and the Homburg branch of the A line was originally planned as part of the D line, which was to form a second north–south axis in addition to the A line. After that, the section between Ginnheim and Heddernheimer Landstraße would have become part of the connection from the main station to the university campus Niederursel. The gap between the already existing distance main station – Bockenheimer Warte (U4) and the final stop Ginnheim the line U1, for which already a baureife planning existed, was rejected however after the local elections 2006 by the new coalition of CDU and the Greens.

This resulted in the need to connect the Neubauviertel on the Riedberg over the A-line to the subway network. Between the stations Heddernheimer highway, Wiesenau and Zeilweg a new track triangle was planned. This is where the completely above-ground new line over the Riedberg, built between June 2008 and December 2010, begins. Of the almost four kilometers of track, 2.3 km were built as a grass track and 1.5 km as a conventional gravel track. In the area of the new Gleisdreieck, the previous branch from Heddernheim to the northern portal of the Nordweststadt Tunnel was swiveled slightly to the northeast and the Heddernheimer Landstraße station was moved by a few meters. Unlike originally planned the Riedberg received thereby a direct connection to the city center. Only the planning designation D IV still reminds of the original planning.

The 12.3-kilometer U8 runs every 15 minutes between Südbahnhof and Riedberg; In order to win the required timetable routes on the A route, the clock of the U3 between Südbahnhof and Oberursel was also extended to a quarter of an hour. Behind the Riedberg station, a single-track turning plant for the U8 was built between the track towards Nieder-Eschbach.

Since December 2010, the 10.3 kilometer U9 service has been operating on the originally planned D line. It starts in Ginnheim and initially drives together with the U1. Shortly after the station Heddernheimer highway it turns off and meets in front of the station Wiesenau on the U3 and the new U8. While the U8 only goes to Riedberg, the U9 is continued via Kalbach to Nieder-Eschbach on the route of the U2. The U9 is thus the first Frankfurt subway service, which does not affect the city center, as long as the gap in the D-stretch between Bockenheim and Ginnheim remains.

The station Ginnheim is now a central transfer station between the tram route 16, the subways U1 and U9 and there-operating bus lines 39 and 64. At the station Niddapark a four-track expansion of the Main-Weser-Bahn is under construction. An interchange is created between U-Bahn and S-Bahn service S6 which is planned to call there. Travelers from the north could then change to tram 16 or suburban train S6 to get to the main station.

Instead of the originally planned 175 million euros cost this variant, which was presented in December 2006 by the then Traffic Department Lutz Sikorski, only 71 million. 70 percent of this is borne by the federal and state governments. It was opened at the timetable change on December 12, 2010.

== Opening Dates ==
Stretch	Opening	Stations	Notes
Oberursel Bhf – Hohemark (Gebirgsbahn)	2 October 1899 Gv / 1. November 1899 Pv	...	steam tram under FLAG with passenger and freight traffic, 1910 electrified
Heddernheim – Gonzenheim – Homburg Rondell (– Homburg Markt)	4 May 1910	...	Small electric line under FLAG
Heddernheim – Oberursel Bf	31 May 1910	...	Small electric line under FLAG
Hauptwache – Heddernheim – Nordweststadt	4 October 1968	14	first part of Frankfurter U-Bahn
Heddernheim – Gonzenheim	19 December 1971	7	Partial takeover of the Homburger local railway line into the underground network
Hauptwache – Theaterplatz	4 November 1973	1	
Nordweststadt – Römerstadt	29 September 1974	1	
Zeilweg – Oberursel – Hohemark	27 May 1978	13	Takeover of the Oberurseler local railway line and the mountain railway into the underground network
Römerstadt – Ginnheim	27 May 1978	1	
Theaterplatz – Frankfurt Südbahnhof	29 September 1984	2	first Frankfurter Maintunnel
Niddapark	23 April 1989	1	Einbau einer neuen Hochbahnstation in die bestehende Strecke
Station Lahnstraße	1989	−1	Merging of two stations, Motorenfabrik and Oberstedter Straße into Station Lahnstraße
Station Rosengärtchen	1 June 1997	1	Addition of new stop on an existing route
Niederursel – Riedberg – Kalbach	12 December 2010	2	the part is officially under Strecke D

== Rolling Stock ==
Since the end of 2012, two different types of vehicles have been used on the A line, the U4 and U5 railcars. The vehicles are each 2.65 meters wide. The Frankfurt underground is normal gauge (1435 mm gauge) and runs with 600 V DC, which is supplied via a catenary. The U4 series was built by DUEWAG and Siemens, the U5 series by Bombardier Transportation.

Previously, the services on the A-line since the start of operation in 1968 were worked with vehicles of the U2 series. By 1985, a total of 104 units of this six-axle railcar series were delivered to Frankfurt. Due to the numerous different platform heights, the vehicles were initially equipped with a fixed step for platform heights of 32 and 56 cm (U2, no longer available), with the change to 80 cm high platforms they were on the variant U2h with 87 cm entrance height and one through retrofitted conditionally small stage in the door area. Between 1966 and 1978 were also two light rail prototypes of the U1 series sporadically used on the A-line.

Initially, the vehicles were delivered in the Frankfurt city colors red / white. In the mid-1980s, a repainting in orange / ivory. Since the mid-1990s, there has been a further repainting in the new VGF house color "subaru vista blue", a kind of turquoise.

Since 1995, the U4 series has been used, which was procured exclusively for the A-line. Until 1998, 39 vehicles of this type were delivered. Until the opening of the Riedberg line in December 2010, they operated mainly on the U2 and partly on the U1 and U3, since mainly on the U1 and U9 and partly as an amplifier on the U2.

Since 2008, the vehicles of the new U5 series have been in operation on the A line. A total of 146 ordered vehicles will be used later in the entire urban railway network. They can be coupled with the vehicles of the U4 series and can be used together in a train.

Since delivery of the vehicles of the type U5, the U2 motor coaches were parked, last drove the U2 cars only on the line U1. This mission ended on 5 November 2012.

== Depots ==
The vehicles of the A-line are stationed in the depot Heddernheim. It is located immediately north of the eponymous station, which historically and operationally occupies a central role for the A-routes. The depot was built in 1910 as a tram depot and was rebuilt during the commissioning of the underground in 1968 for this.

The former depot of the FLAG in Bommersheim serves today as a parking facility for the trains of the U3. At the train stations Oberursel and Südbahnhof there are further parking facilities.

== Future Plans ==
=== Bad Homburg ===
The subterranean extension to the center of Bad Homburg has been the wish of the political majority for 30 years and is also included in the zoning plan of the planning association, but realization is still uncertain. An aboveground and therefore cheaper route failed because of environmental concerns, but at that time also on the contradiction of the FVV, who saw in the line parallel to the S-Bahn. The current plans envisage a medium-term, partly tunnel-guided, extension to the Bad Homburg station and a link with the planned regional long-haul West.

Since 2007, it is planned to demolish today's terminus in Gonzenheim and to rebuild to the west of the Gotenstrasse underground. In place of the previous terminus, the urban railway line is to be lowered into a 350-meter-long tunnel and underpass the railway line Bad Homburg-Friedrichsdorf parallel to the Frankfurter Landstraße. Then they should be introduced to the railway embankment and parallel to the existing railway line on their level the Long Mile and the feeder road with the S-Bahn service S5 and the Taunusbahn cross.

In June 2010, the plan approval process should begin originally, in March 2011, the Regional Council Darmstadt started the consultation process. Due to objections, the Regional Council Darmstadt has initiated the second hearing. In January 2016, the plan approval decision was finally approved, provided that it becomes [obsolete] legal force in March 2016 and that the financing agreement is in place as well, with a subsequent period of about two years for further planning and 2½ years for construction.

As of August 2017, two lawsuits were pending against the plan approval decision at the Hessian Administrative Court. With regard to financing, the state of Hesse has agreed to pay part of the costs.

=== Extension of the tunnel in Eschersheimer Landstraße ===
Since the opening of the A-line, it is planned to extend the tunnel under the Eschersheimer Landstraße from the "provisional" ramp on Dornbusch to Eschersheim. The ground-level guidance on the central strip of the street was originally planned only as a temporary solution. Since the opening of the route, 33 people have been killed by accidents involving subway trains. Nevertheless, the extension of the tunnel with an estimated cost of around 300 million euros is considered unfeasible. A subsidy under the municipal transport financing law is very unlikely because of the expected negative cost-benefit factor, since the forecast zero case, on the other hand, a new tunnel would be assessed, would reflect the present state, i.e. an already operated ground-level route, and the economic Benefits, above all, take into account the travel time profit, which could not outweigh the expected high construction costs.

=== At Sachsenhausen ===
The plans for the underground extension of the A-line from the Südbahnhof to the Sachsenhäuser Warte (with an intermediate station Milan Street) were already well advanced in the late 1990s, when the federal government withdrew its funding commitment. As federal and state funding is essential for funding, the project has been postponed to the distant future. Beyond the Sachsenhäuser Warte a connecting route through the city forest should lead to Neu-Isenburg. At Sachsenhäuser Warte a huge park-and-ride parking garage was built.

== Alignment of platform heights ==
The operation of goods as well as the parallel operation of subway and tram were the cause of a long-term provisional in the Frankfurt subway network. The U2 railcar had a floor height of 97 cm above rail level. With regard to the parallel operation with the converted tram cars, however, the platforms were initially only 56 cm high, otherwise no safer entry into the narrower Mt cars would have been possible. On the underground stations between Theaterplatz and Miquel- / Adickesallee this was achieved by a simple ballast in the area of the platforms. The aboveground stations had received from the outset lower platforms. For height compensation, the U2 cars were delivered with fixed treads. After elimination of the parallel operation, the stations were rebuilt to 87 cm platform height or equalized by lowering the ballast bed and the steps of the subway cars are removed.

This provisional remained initially even after the elimination of the tram operation required because with regard to the gauge of the freight wagon, the platforms between Heddernheim and Oberursel had been kept only 32 cm above rail level. In addition, in the construction of the stations Schweizer Platz and Südbahnhof in miner's construction in the 1980s, the platforms were planned only 56 cm high; the subsequent lowering of the ballast bed was not taken into account here.

After the termination of freight transport, the platforms on the Oberurseler route were gradually increased to the uniform size of 56 cm. 1994 to 1998, the 39 series U4 railcars were delivered, which had a floor height of 87 cm and got along without additional step. Instead of two platform heights with a uniform floor height of the vehicles, there was now a uniform platform height on the entire A route, but two vehicle types with different floor heights: 97 cm with additional step or 87 cm without step.

Therefore, from 1999 onwards, all stations were gradually brought to a uniform height of 80 cm above the rail level in extensive construction work, which allows stepless entry into the trains of the U4 series. The aboveground stations received completely newly built platforms, while at the tunnel stations, as originally planned, the ballast bed could be lowered. Only at the railway stations Schweizer Platz and Südbahnhof, which were not designed for this purpose, the platforms themselves had to be raised. Therefore, the platforms of these stations are now about 24 cm higher than the foot of the stairs and escalators that lead down to the platforms. This difference in height was or is compensated until today by the installation of new escalators by ramps.

Since the U2 motor coaches could not be waived for the time being, they were rebuilt to the type U2h. Here, the tread was set from 68 to 87 cm high, leaving a level of 10 cm to the interior of the vehicle in the door entrance area. The U4 railcars and the U5 railcars acquired since 2008, on the other hand, are barrier-free on the converted stations. Since November 5, 2012 run on the A-line in normal operation no U2h railcars more.

Some stations of Frankfurt's oldest subway line have also been redeveloped and redesigned, such as the Grüneburgweg, Heddernheim and Nordweststadt stations (since then under the name Nordwestzentrum).
