= Eden Frankfurt =

Skyscraper in Frankfurt, Germany

- Eden Hochhaus (German)
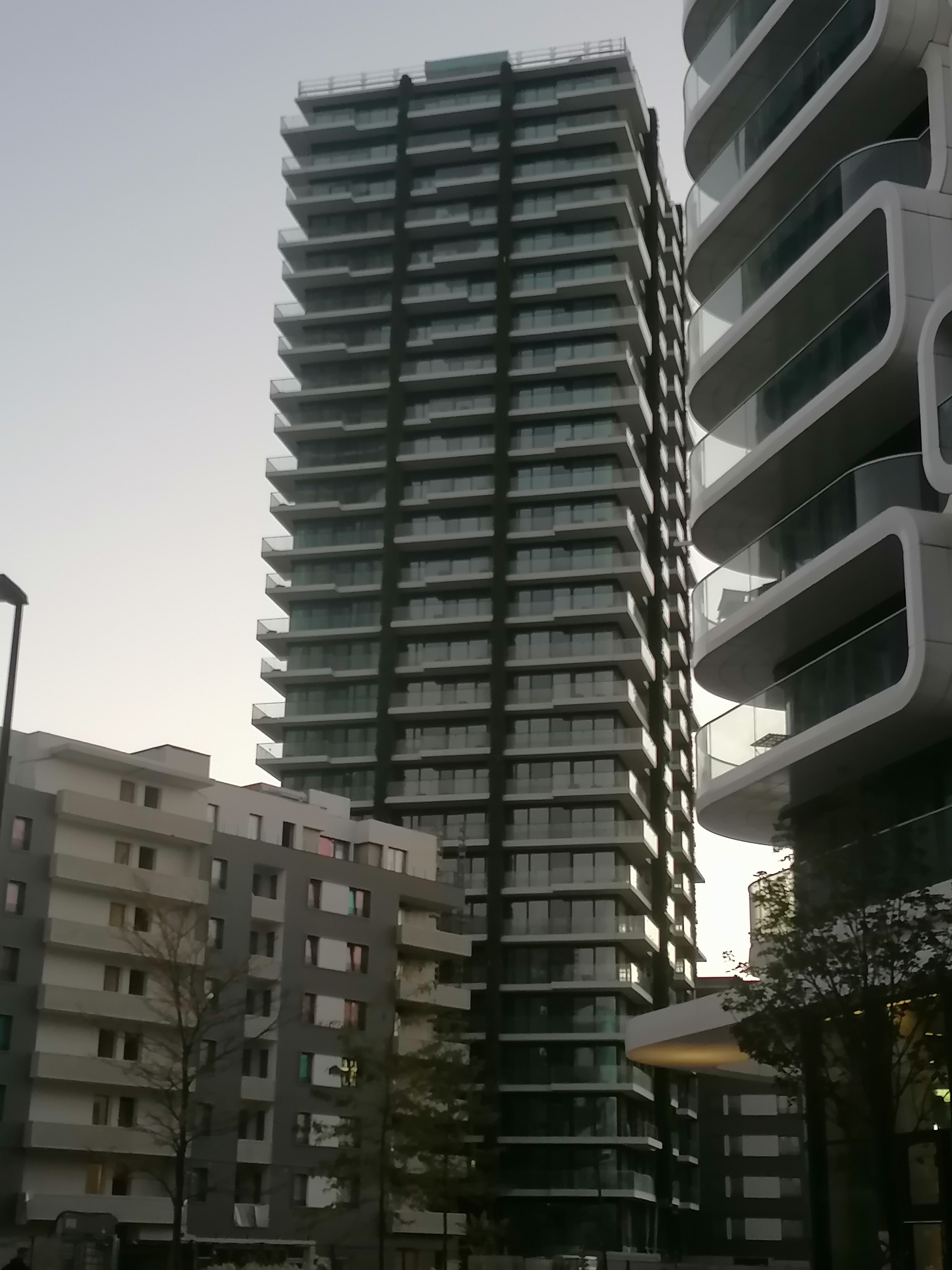
- Interactive map of the Eden Frankfurt area

General information
- Status: Completed
- Type: Residential
- Location: Frankfurt, Germany, 11 Europa Allee, Frankfurt am Main, Germany
- Coordinates: 50.10752°N 8.65368°E
- Construction started: 2018
- Completed: 2022

Height
- Roof: 96.5 m (317 ft)

Technical details
- Structural system: Concrete
- Floor count: 29

Design and construction
- Architects: Architekturbüro Magnus Kaminiarz & Cie; Helmut Jahn

Website
- Eden Frankfurt

Eden Frankfurt (German: Eden Hochhaus) (also known as Tower 90) is a high-rise residential building in the Gallus district of Frankfurt, Germany. Built between 2018 and 2022, the tower stands at 96.5 m (317 ft) with 29 floors and is the current 44th tallest building in Frankfurt.

== History ==
=== Planning ===
The construction of the 98-meter-high residential building with 27 floors began with the groundbreaking ceremony on 29 May 2018, and was originally scheduled to be completed in 2021. The completion date has been postponed several times because the building has not been approved by the authorities. The first apartment keys were then handed over in June 2023.

The high-rise was built on the former Bosch site next to Mainzer Landstrasse. The hotel high-rise The Spin, a residential complex of ABG Frankfurt Holding with 270 apartments and a station on the U5 subway line were built on the same 13,700 square meter plot. The client was the investor gsp Städtebau from Berlin, which built the project until the underground car park was completed. After that, the new owner Immobel took over the project development.

A height of around 90 metres was originally planned. In addition, the number of planned condominiums was increased from 200 to 263, but these will be smaller than originally planned and will mostly have one to three rooms. There will also be three penthouses. In addition to a concierge service, there will be a fitness studio. Panoramic windows are planned for the rooms, and the building façade will be covered in greenery. The 420-space underground car park will also be available for the surrounding buildings.

The construction site is part of the European Quarter. Nearby is the building complex with the Skyline Plaza shopping center and the Grand Tower residential high-rise, which was built by gsp Städtebau.

=== Architecture ===
Originally, Robert Bosch GmbH wanted to build an office tower on the site formerly used by the company Tenovis. In 2013, this plan was changed and a residential tower with a height of between 60 and 90 meters was to be built. Because no investor could be found, Robert Bosch GmbH sold the property in 2015 to ABG Frankfurt Holding, gsp Städtebau and a private investor. Plans were presented for the construction of a hotel tower with a maximum height of 115 meters and a residential tower with a height of around 90 meters. In addition, a block perimeter development with apartment buildings was to be built. Completion was planned for 2020 or 2021.

At the beginning of 2016, a realization and ideas competition was announced, which was won in March 2016 by the architectural firms Jahn and Magnus Kaminiarz & Cie. The design envisaged a 90-meter-high residential tower ("Tower 90") and a block perimeter development on Europa-Allee. In 2018, the name "Eden" was announced. It is an allusion to the mythological Garden of Eden.

In January 2019, the project developer gsp Städtebau announced that the project had been sold to the Belgian company Immobel.

== See also ==
- List of tallest buildings in Frankfurt
- List of tallest buildings in Germany
