= Europaviertel =

Neighborhood of Frankfurt, Germany

Coordinates: 50°06′34″N 8°39′07″E

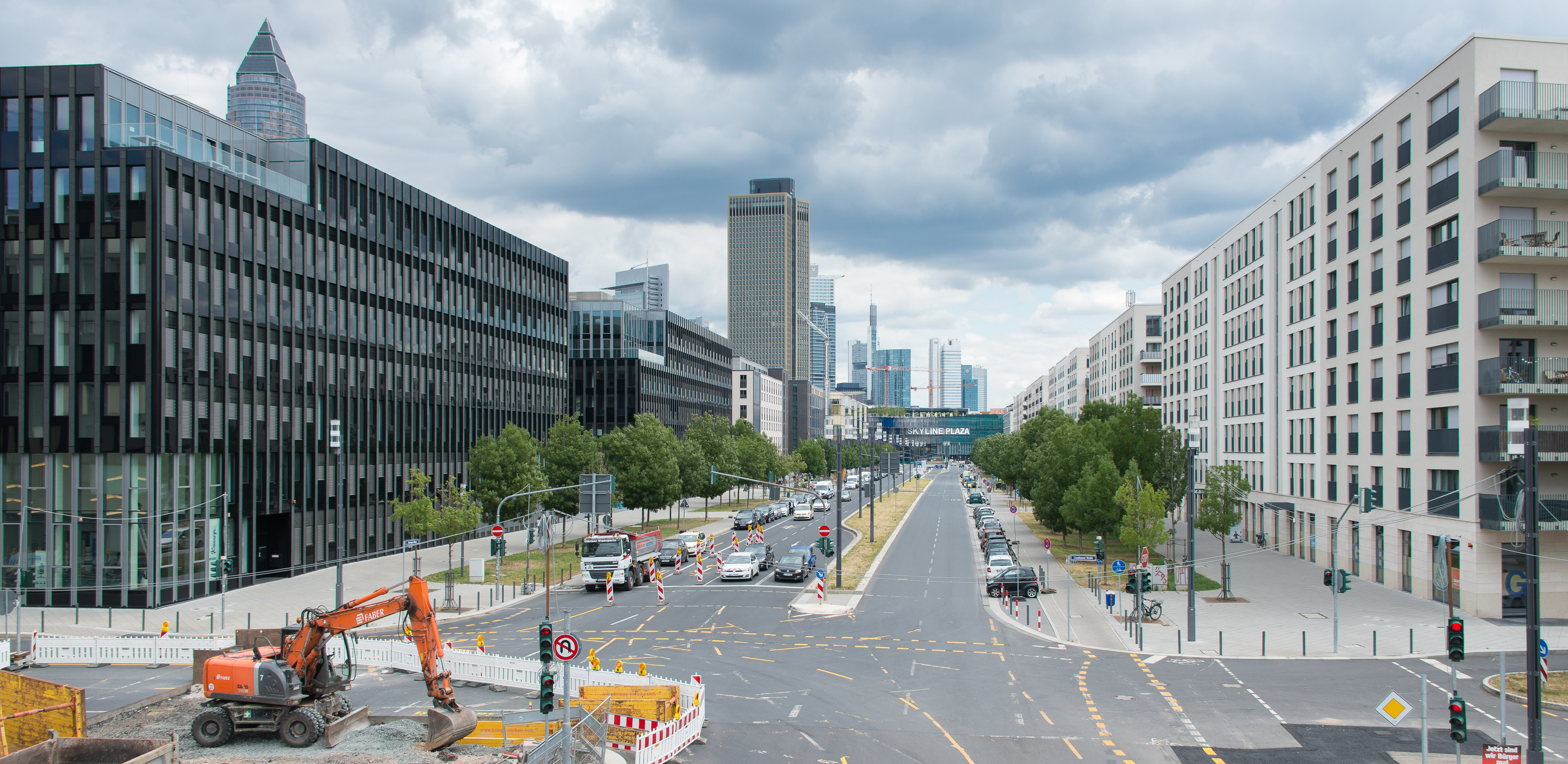
Eastern Europaallee, the main street in the new quarter

The Europaviertel (European quarter) is a housing and business quarter development in the Gallus district of Frankfurt am Main, Germany. It is built on the former ground of the main goods station Hauptgüterbahnhof. Development work began in 2005, and the first building was opened in 2006. Upon its completion, the area will have offices, hotels, apartments, a school and social infrastructure, parks, and shopping and leisure facilities. The completion of a connection to Frankfurt's U-Bahn is planned for after 2025. Europaviertel will approximately have a population of 30,000 workers and 8,000 to 10,000 residents; This ratio could still shift in favor of the number of residents due to the increased demand for apartments since around 2012. The Skyline Plaza complex, including a shopping mall and congress center, is within the district.

== Size and location ==
The cleared area is almost 90 hectares (220 acres) in size. The area is divided - based on the two property owners - into Europaviertel West and Europaviertel Ost. The clearly visible border is the elevated track of the Main–Weser Railway on the bridge Emser Brücke, between the stations Galluswarte and Messe. In the western part, Aurelis Asset GmbH owns 66.7 hectares (165 acres) and in the eastern part, 18 hectares (44 acres) belong to Vivico Real Estate GmbH (since June 2011: CA Immo). Today the district covers a total of 145 hectares (360 acres), including other peripheral areas. The area extends approximately 2.4 kilometres (1.5 mi) from the residential area on the Rebstock area and the Kuhwaldsiedlung in the northwest along the exhibition grounds to Güterplatz in the southeast. South of the Europaviertel the Hellerhofsiedlung housing area in the "old" Gallus is located.

== History ==
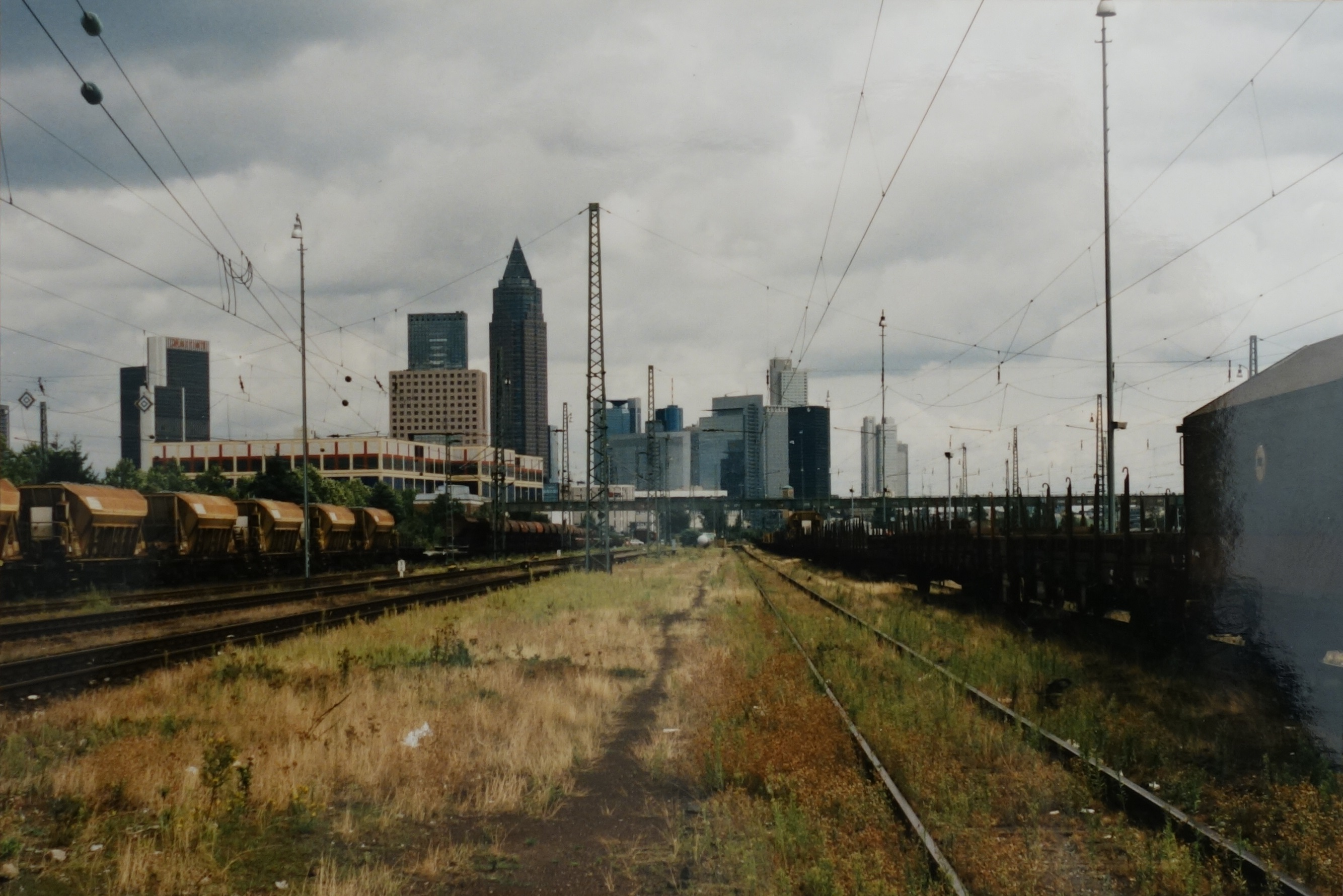
The Europaviertel is built on the former ground of the main goods station Hauptgüterbahnhof. The picture was taken where today the Gleisfeldpark (e. g. Railway track-field Park) is located.

Ideas for relocating the freight railway facilities that were previously on the site already existed between the two World Wars. They came to an end with the Second World War and were not taken up again afterwards. Instead, the destroyed facilities were rebuilt and modernized in the 1960s. It was only with the expansion of the city of Frankfurt to the west, which found its highly visible expression in the skyscraper silhouette, particularly the trade fair tower, that the pressure to use the space to a higher quality increased. In addition, there was the need to expand the Frankfurt trade fair, the move of the Federal Railway headquarters in 1993 to a new building on the site of the repair shop on Idsteiner Straße, which had already been closed in 1989, and the structural change in rail freight transport towards transport with containers. Both the trade fair and the Deutsche Bundesbahn commissioned studies into a conversion, initially limited to the areas east of the Emser Bridge. In 1996, as part of its Frankfurt 21 project, Deutsche Bahn decided to close the main freight yard and the marshalling yard west of the Emser Bridge and to relocate the remaining freight activities. The container traffic was concentrated in the expanded terminal at the Ostbahnhof, the general cargo traffic ended up on the road and the shunting business was taken up in other marshalling yards, e.g. B. in Mainz-Bischofsheim. Operations at the main freight station were discontinued in 1998. In 1999, the Frankfurt planning office Albert Speer & Partner (AS&P) created a framework plan for the future development of the area on behalf of Deutsche Bahn. The usage concept envisaged shares of 25 percent each for residential areas, green areas, trade fair expansion and mixed areas for the derelict railway areas. A competing plan, which the architect Helmut Jahn designed on behalf of Deutsche Bank under the title Messestadt, was not pursued further because Deutsche Bahn did not want to sell the core site. First, the neighboring Messe Frankfurt acquired 31,000 m² of space in order to be able to expand its premises to the south. On the expansion area, among other things, were created: from 2000 to 2001 the exhibition hall 3 and the new east gate. Subsequently, in 2003, shunting operations were also stopped, clearing the way for construction work in the western European Quarter.

=== Europaviertel East ===
- August 2004: Start of construction of Europa-Allee
- May 2006: Completion of the Mövenpick Hotel
- November 2007: Groundbreaking ceremony for the first apartments on Europa-Allee
- January 2008: Contract between Vivico and Hyatt for a Grand Hyatt. In spring 2013 it was announced that the Hyatt Group had abandoned the project. At this point south of Kap Europa there is now a hotel on a property that has been divided again; The southern high-rise called the Grand Tower (formerly “Tower 2”) has been under construction since the beginning of 2016 and, at 172 meters, is Germany's tallest purely-residential property.
- September 2008: Groundbreaking for Tower 185
- October 2008: Groundbreaking ceremony for the Europa-Allee 12–22 office building
- November 2008: Start of construction of the Meininger Hotel
- July 2009: The first apartments are occupied in the Europaviertel
- February 2010: Meininger Hotel is completed
- September 2022: The One high-rise building, which is located on the construction site north of Kap Europa and reaches a height of 175 meters, was opened.
- Building law also exists for a (currently dormant) project, the up-to-369-meter high Millennium Tower.

=== Europaviertel West ===
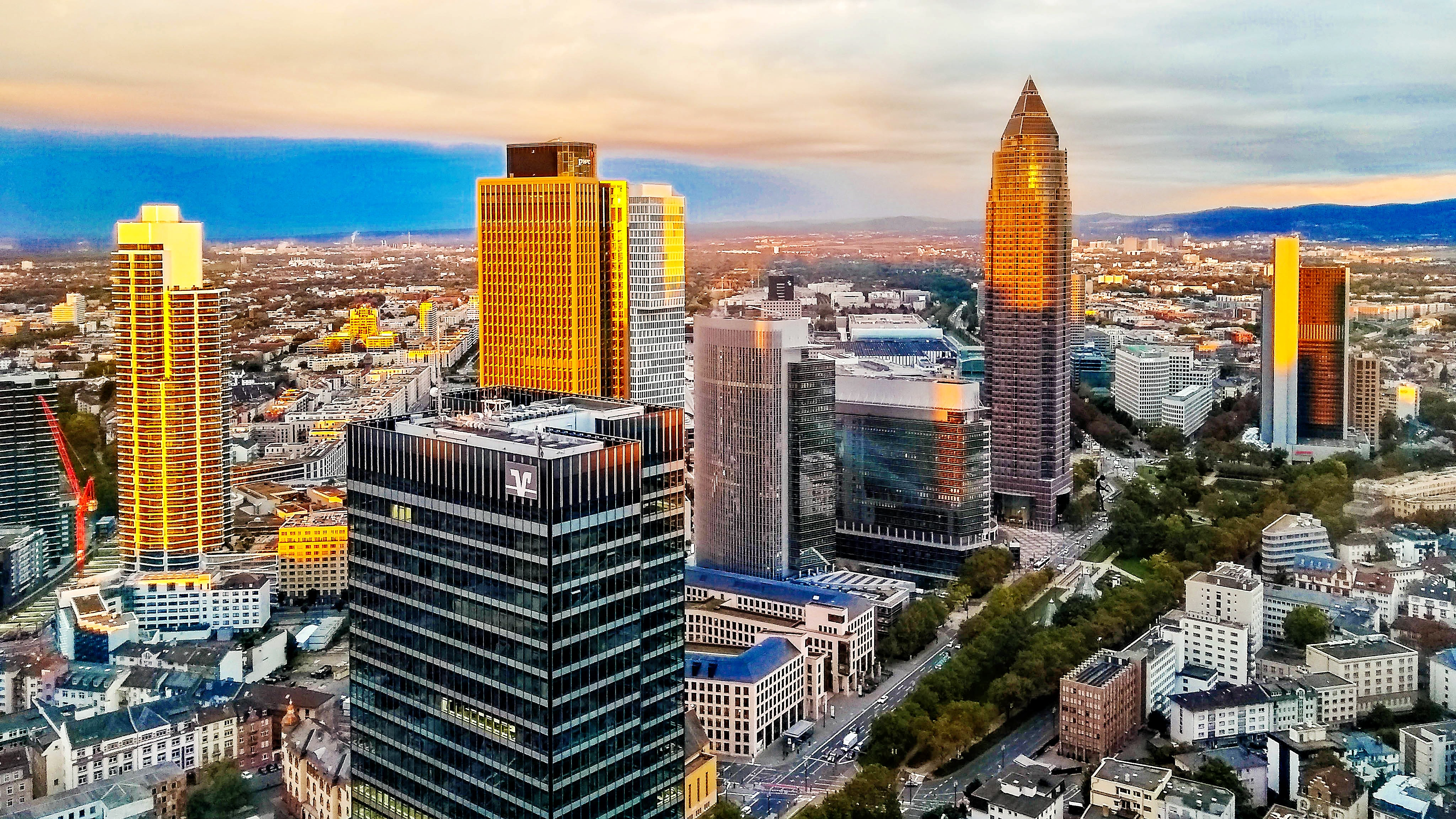
Europaviertel West at sunrise

By mid-2010, Aurelis had cleared the 66.7-hectare part of the development area west of the Emser Bridge of old tracks, disposed of any contamination and made it accessible. In the course of 18 months of work, around 300,000 cubic metres of material were moved and reinstalled. Aurelis began marketing its site in the Europaviertel West in September 2008. Two open residential quarters are to be built to the north-west. One is the "Helenenhöfe" and the other is the "Parkend", where 18 high-quality properties will be named after well-known European parks. The Helenenhöfe will largely be publicly subsidised housing; overall, the Europaviertel will offer 30 percent of subsidised housing. In addition, two mixed-use quarters, "Boulevard Mitte" and "Boulevard West", are to be built in a central location (directly on Europaallee), which will reflect the full diversity of an urban district with offices, restaurants and social facilities. The old signal box of the former freight station was located directly on the route of Boulevard Mitte. Although well-preserved, original and worthy of preservation, it had to be demolished in July 2014. Boulevard West will also see the revival of a long-despised building type: with Axis (60 metres high) and Westside Tower (66 metres), Frankfurt will once again have two purely-residential high-rises after a long absence, and more will follow in Boulevard Mitte. For the 4,000 to 5,000 residents expected in the West area, three day-care centres and a primary school, a supermarket, local shops, restaurants, a pharmacy and doctor's offices as well as the central Tel-Aviv-Platz are planned. Boulevard Mitte will be the focus of the office and service buildings, as well as smaller commercial premises and condominiums. Its entrances will be marked by two high-rise buildings at the Emser Brücke and at the Europagarten.

The focal point and connecting element of these quarters will be the 6-hectare "Europagarten" park with a representative fountain, under which the otherwise 60-meter-wide, boulevard-like Europa-Allee will be led in a three-cell tunnel approximately 400 meters long. The shell of the tunnel was completed in June 2016, and its road function was opened at the beginning of December 2016. The first section of the Europagarten has been completed since January 2011, also with the intention of giving potential property buyers a visual idea of the future appearance of the area. The previously completely flat Gleisfeld was partially modeled as slightly hilly, and with a third of planned green space it is intended to form a natural urban space. According to the current planning status, the Europaviertel West is to develop quietly and harmoniously, with the target date for development being around 2020.

In spring 2013, the Europagarten received a continuous green connection with the new Rebstockpark from a small "Gleisfeldpark", connected by a pedestrian bridge over the lower "Straße der Nationen" and the new triangular "Zeppelinpark". The " Lotte-Specht-Park " was created in autumn 2014 as a connection to the old buildings on Idsteiner Straße in the southeast. These smaller green spaces, which have been laid out with recreational and play areas, increase the value of the adjacent residential buildings currently being built. Around 40 percent of the purely residential buildings can thus advertise themselves as "right next to the park". The condominiums offered so far in the upper price segment are often largely sold off the plan, or at the latest by the time construction begins.

The Europaallee has been expanded to its full width in the middle section since summer 2014. This central axis will be led into the tunnel under the Eurogarten. The Europagarten was completed in 2018, but was not allowed to be used for a long time due to structural defects and was closed to the public until it was finally opened in December 2022.

The Solid Home building, designed by KSP Jürgen Engel Architekten, with its 200 condominiums units, is part of a new and next generation of residential high-rises in the west of Frankfurt.

== Transport connections ==
The S-Bahn lines S3 to S6 run through the east of the Europaviertel with the adjacent Galluswarte and Messe stations. The eastern part of the Europaviertel can also be reached via the U-Bahn line U4 (Festhalle/Messe station). Trams numbers 16 and 17, and buses number 50 and night buses N4 and N16 also stop here. A little further south, Frankfurt am Main tram lines 11, 14 and 21 run via Güterplatz station. The M46 metro bus runs from the main station to the Römerhof terminus. It serves the Güterplatz, Platz der Einheit, Den Haager Straße and Dubliner Straße stops in the eastern Europaviertel, and Stephensonstraße, Europagarten/Messe West, Römischer Ring, Maastrichter Ring and Europaviertel West stops in the western Europaviertel. The next stop is Messeparkhaus.

The original resolution envisaged that the entire Europaviertel would be more centrally and efficiently served in the medium term by way of an underground extension of the U5 subway line to the Messepark garage (at least as far as the Europagarten). The currently-planned route branches off from line B after the Hauptbahnhof station at the level of Mainzer Landstraße, runs through the current turning facility and then reaches the southeastern Europaviertel at the Güterplatz subway station. This route, estimated at a cost of €281 million (as of June 2015), then follows the central Europa-Allee and has further relatively close-lying above-ground stations at the Emser Brücke, at the Europagarten (east) and, to the west of the Europagarten, the terminus at Wohnpark. This route is also intended to provide access to the densely populated northern part of the Gallusviertel. The investor groups had urged that the subway should not be built entirely above ground — as the city had already suggested for cost reasons — because cutting through the main Europaallee axis would devalue the character of the entire neighborhood. They cited, in particular, the negative experiences with the above-ground subway line on the northern side of Eschersheimer Landstraße, which has divided a mature neighborhood since 1968 and led to frequent accidents.

Due to the high costs of the predominantly-underground route, the state of Hesse and the federal government refused to contribute their funding at the beginning of 2012. For cost reasons, the route will now be approximately half above ground, contrary to the previous plan. The new plans envisage, as a compromise, bringing the tunneled route back to the surface before the Emser Brücke station. This and the other two stations would be built above ground and barrier-free in the middle of Europa-Allee. In the Europagarten area, the railway line, together with the car lanes, will once again run in a three-cell tunnel (an enclosure). The city council decided this on 1 March 2012, and the magistrate approved this plan on 3 May 2013. Construction of the subway is now scheduled to begin in 2017, following the selection of the more expensive mining tunneling method due to subsoil conditions. The approximately-550-meter-long shared tunnel section beneath the Europagarten began in February 2015 using cut-and-cover construction and is scheduled to be open to road vehicles in 2017, allowing the central park to be completed in 2017. The City of Frankfurt aimed to complete the approximately-2.7-kilometer-long subway line by 2024. However, this deadline, postponed by five years, failed to meet the original target of completion by 2019 stipulated in the Municipal Transport Financing Act. Following a defect in the tunnel boring machine, the planned completion was postponed to 2025.

== Criticism ==
The Süddeutsche Zeitung described the Europaviertel as a "drawing-board district" from which one would flee after an hour; and the Europaallee as a "terrifying, kilometer-long street corridor". The Frankfurter Allgemeine Zeitung, on its front page, illustrated with a photo from the Europaviertel, posed the questions "This is supposed to be urban?" and "Why can't we build any more livable cities?", and criticized the uniformity of the "perforated facades that stare at the viewer". The sense of a public space that was not conceived in a technocratic way had been lost, which was being left to a street corridor. The Frankfurt architect Christoph Mäckler published a comprehensive critique of modern urban planning in the Frankfurter Allgemeine Zeitung, focusing on Frankfurt's Europaviertel, but also on comparable projects of the same name: "And when we walk through the new urban districts behind the train stations of Stuttgart, Zurich, or Frankfurt, which are being touted by planners and which believe their urbanity and sustainability can be demonstrated simply by their name 'Europaviertel', we shiver in the face of the repulsive cold and boredom that confronts us in the undefined urban spaces." For this reason, popular parlance is said to have already given the Europaallee the name "Stalinallee". The musician Elias Gottstein, part of the duo Guaia Guaia, sings "das Europaviertel - total missglückt" ("The Europaviertel - totally failed") in the lyrics of his song "Geilste Stadt".

Further criticism of the development of the Europaviertel comes from former Frankfurt urban planner Martin Wentz. He praises the mix of modern and traditional architecture, but criticizes the lack of a central meeting place and the isolation of the district. Wentz emphasizes the importance of green spaces and criticizes their reduction in the district.

Apart from the criticism of the general architecture of the Europaviertel, it was also objected that, contrary to the announcements and the legal requirements in force in Frankfurt since 2014, not 30% but a maximum of 20% of subsidised housing was built, and the fear was expressed that rising rents would subsequently lead to a gentrification of the classic “working-class district” of Gallus.
