= Mainzer Landstraße =

One of the main arterial roads in Frankfurt am Main, Hesse, Germany

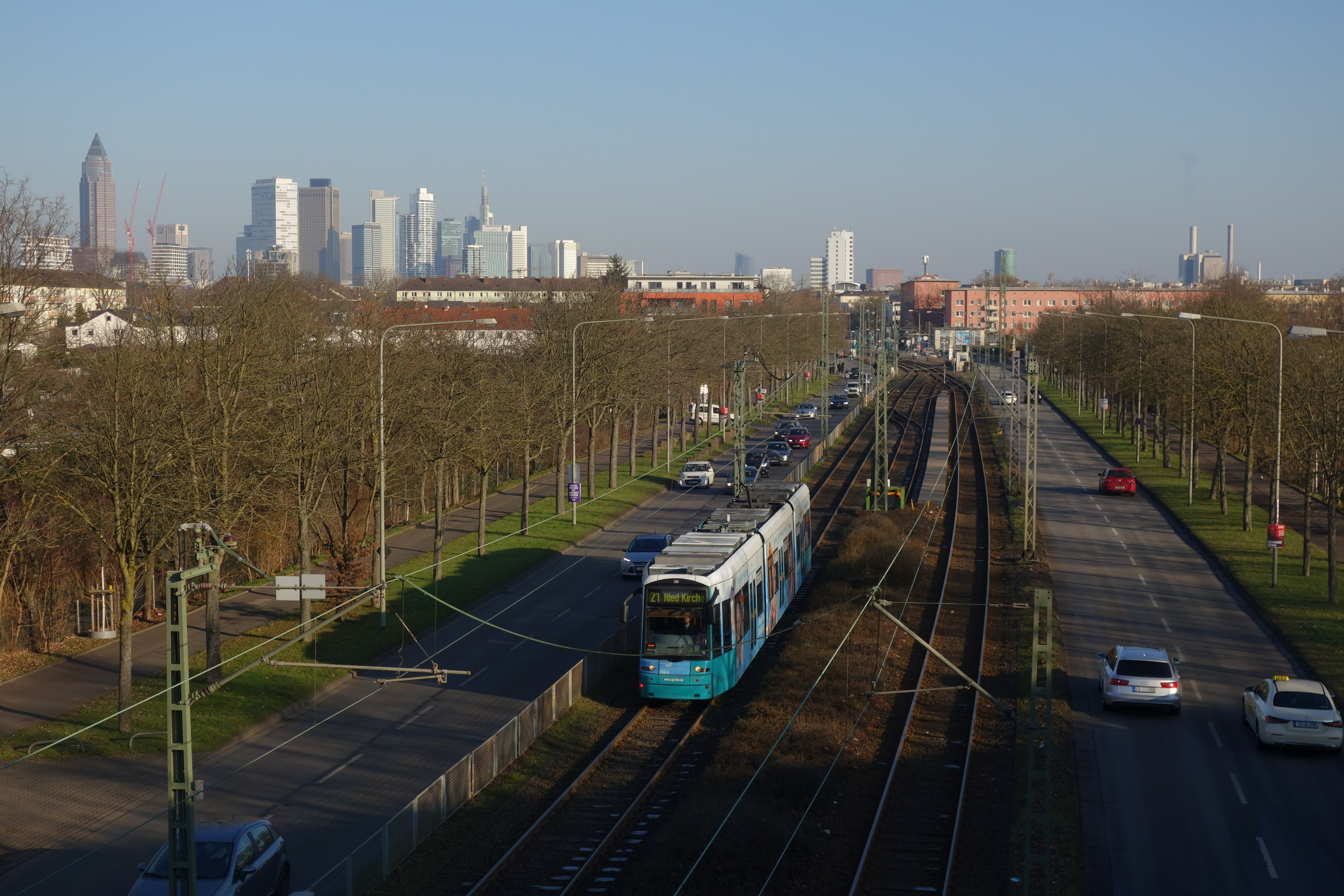
- Mainzer Landstraße at the western part of Gallus district, view facing east, with tramway heading for Frankfurt-Nied
- Length: 8.3 km (5.2 mi)
- East end: Taunusanlage, Frankfurt Innenstadt
- West end: Höchst

Construction
- Inauguration: 1750

The Mainzer Landstraße is one of the main arterial roads in Frankfurt am Main, running west from the city centre to the outlying suburbs of the city. The road runs largely parallel with the River Main along its northern bank, and at 8.3 kilometres (5.2 mi) in length is Frankfurt's second longest road.

== History ==
The road was built between 1746 and 1750 as part of the longer route between Frankfurt and Mainz. As one of the most heavily used roads in Frankfurt, factories soon sprang up along its length as Germany industrialised in the 19th century, including the headquarters of Adler and Tenovis. A tramway, the modern day lines 11 and 21, soon followed, supported by the industries along its length. By the outbreak of World War I, there were around 40 factories along the length of the road, with more along the many side roads that branch off it.

With the opening of Bundesautobahn 66, Mainzer Landstraße has become less important for long distance travel and now mostly facilitates travel around the west end of the city. Accordingly, it was downgraded from a regional road (Landesstraße) to a district road (Kreisstraße).

== Route ==
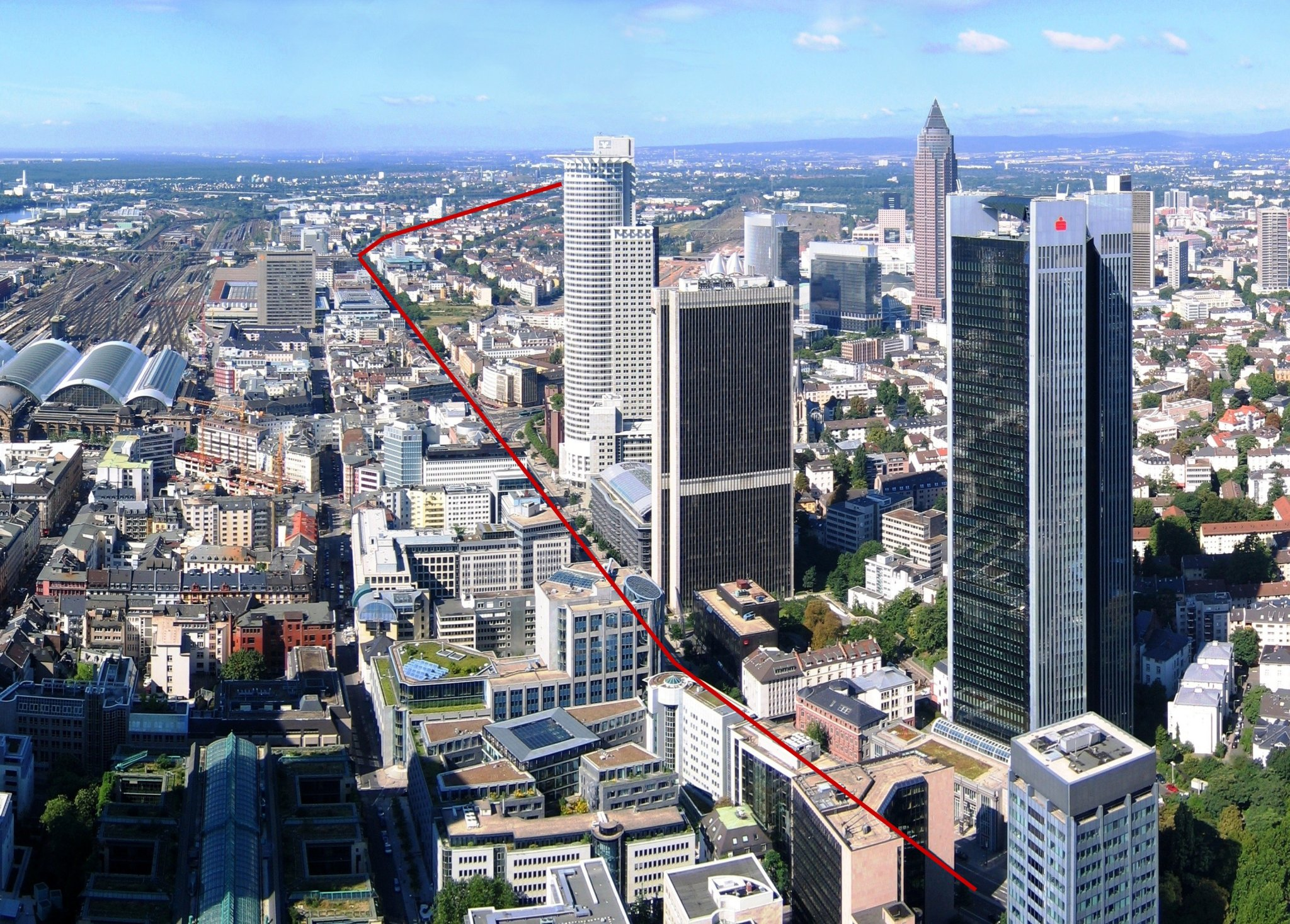
Overview from city to the west

From the Innenstadt, Mainzer Landstraße runs through Westend, Bahnhofsviertel, Gallus, Griesheim and Nied on the way to Höchst.

The road begins at Taunusanlage station, close to the Deutsche Bank Twin Towers. Between Taunusanlage and the crossroads at Platz der Republik, it passes the Westend Tower, the Frankfurter Büro Center and the City-Haus. The tramlines join Mainzer Landstraße at Platz der Republik, and the road then continues into Gallus, where it passes under Galluswarte S-Bahn station and past the Galluswarte watch tower, which marks the historic walls of Frankfurt. The section of the road in Gallus is known for its high concentration of car dealerships and garages. An alternative tram route to the south lets trams bypass part of Mainzer Landstraße around Galluswarte and a headshunt tram siding at Mönchhofstraße on the outskirts of Gallus let trams stop and reverse there at off-peak times.

At the border between Gallus and Griesheim, the road passes under Bundesautobahn 5 before it meets Bundesstraße 40, which connects Frankfurt Airport with the city centre and Bundesautobahn 66, near Nied. The tramway runs on a special overpass above the junction, and a balloon loop at Nied Kirche (Nied Church) allows the 21 line to terminate there.

The road then crosses the River Nidda, and terminates in Höchst where it meets Bolongarostraße. This road, and its continuation Brüningstraße, runs through the old town and Industriepark Höchst, the headquarters of Hoechst AG.
