= Bahnhofsviertel =

Quarter of Frankfurt am Main, Germany

- Quarter of Frankfurt am Main
- Location of the Bahnhofsviertel (red) and the Ortsbezirk Innenstadt I (light red) within Frankfurt am Main
- Interactive map of Bahnhofsviertel
- Location within Germany Location within Hesse
- Coordinates: 50°06′06″N 08°39′34″E
- Country: Germany
- State: Hesse
- Admin. region: Darmstadt
- District: Urban district
- City: Frankfurt am Main

Area
  - Total: 0.525 km^{2} (0.203 sq mi)

Population (2020-12-31)
  - Total: 3,703
  - Density: 7,050/km^{2} (18,300/sq mi)
- Time zone: UTC+01:00 (CET)
  - Summer (DST): UTC+02:00 (CEST)
- Postal codes: 60329
- Dialling codes: 069
- Vehicle registration: F
- Website: www.bahnhofsviertel.de

The Bahnhofsviertel (German pronunciation: [ˈbaːnhoːfsˌfɪʁtl̩], lit. 'train station quarter') is a quarter of Frankfurt am Main, Germany. It is part of the Ortsbezirk Innenstadt I.

The Bahnhofsviertel was developed between 1891 and 1915. Along with the Westend, the Nordend and the Ostend, it is part of Frankfurt's dense inner city districts. The Bahnhofsviertel is known as one of Frankfurt's main entertainment and red-light districts (the latter especially around Taunusstrasse), along with Alt-Sachsenhausen south of the river Main.

== Geography ==
The Bahnhofsviertel is scarcely half a square kilometre larger than the Altstadt, making it the second smallest district of the city. The longest border line is just short of a kilometre long. Almost trapeze shaped, this district lies between the Alleenring to the west, Mainzer Landstraße in the north and the Anlagenring to the east. The Main river forms a natural border in the south. Adjacent districts to the west are the Gutleutviertel and the Gallus around Frankfurt Central Station, the Westend in the north and the Innenstadt in the east. To the south, on the opposite side of the Main, lies Sachsenhausen.

== History ==
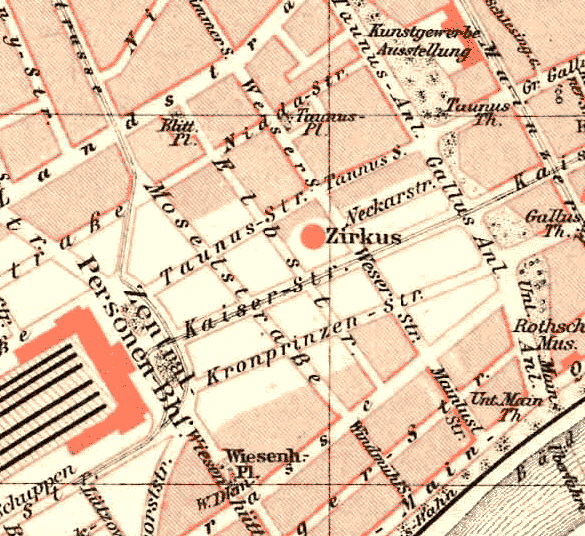
The developing Bahnhofsviertel, 1893. The unbuilt area shows the grounds of the western stations of five years previously. The new street network is already finished.

The area between the Frankfurt city wall and field of the gallows had hardly been constructed by the early nineteenth century. Only farming estates were to be found in this area. Near to the city gallows and as an unprotected site outside the city walls, it was left alone for a long time. As industrialisation came in, the city walls and its gallows were torn down to be replaced initially by villas with large gardens. The technical advances were especially noticeable here. When in 1839 the Taunus Railway was built to the town of Höchst, still part of the Duchy of Nassau, the original Taunus station (Taunusbahnhof) was constructed on the Anlagenring. The track of the Taunus station ran through the middle of the district of today's station quarter. Later the stations of the Main-Neckar and Main-Weser lines were added to that. The western stations were grouped together until 1888, after which time they were replaced by the new Frankfurt central station, which was situated another 500m further west. Thus the railway tracks also became redundant, and the year 1889 was able to begin with a dividing up of the area. As there was still no significant residential zone existing in 1891, the area became the central site of the International Electro-Technical Exhibition led by Oskar von Miller. In the meantime, the large civil land development in the style of the Wilhelminian period was placed under monument protection. In the Second World War the quarter was not so strongly bombed as the inner city, but nevertheless many buildings were destroyed, particularly in the north. In the time of the occupation by the American armed forces the district developed an active nightlife, allowed soldiers free rein to endless brothels.

== Infrastructure ==
The Bahnhofsviertel is well connected to the public transport system because of its central location. The Hauptbahnhof, which borders the borough, offers connection to regional and long distance trains. Two tram lines (11 and 12) cross the Bahnhofsviertel on Münchner Straße. The Willy-Brandt-Platz U-Bahn station and Taunusanlage S-Bahn station are also easily reachable. The well-known meaning of Kaiserstraße has been lost among the street traffic, travel from the Alleenring to the Hauptbahnhof is no longer possible through the Kaisersack. Instead the main traffic vein today is Gutleutstraße, which flows into the theatre tunnel and offers a connection to the old part of town. The roads arrange in a chessboard-like fashion and make orientation easy. The wide east-west streets are constructed like boulevards and communicate the charm of a big city. Numerous nineteenth century buildings have survived through World War II and became chaste residential houses in the 1950s and 1960s, whilst several supplemented skyscrapers. Best known are the Silvertower and the Gallileo at Jürgen-Ponto-Platz (named after the murdered president of Dresdner Bank), the Skyper and the Gewerkschaftshaus in Wilhelm-Leuschner-Straße. The latter was built in 1931, (the architect was Max Taut), and was then the biggest skyscraper in the city. The best known of many hotels in the Bahnhofsviertel, the InterContinental, is also in Wilhelm-Leuschner-Straße.

There are no large parks but in the south of the district lies the Main Riverbank, one of the most popular green areas in Frankfurt. In 1860 a silted branch of the Main, the Kleine Main, was filled up and the offshore island Mainlust was connected to the main bank. On this land Sebastian Rinz, the city gardener, laid out a green area with Mediterranean vegetation which was soon named Nizza in common speech. The Frankfurt families Guaita and Loeen had already possessed large landscaped gardens in the climatically favoured area of the river west of the old city walls since the seventeenth century.

== Red-light district ==
Frankfurt's red-light district is in Bahnhofsviertel. The core of the district consists of Elbestraße, Moselstraße and Taunusstraße. The district was more and more dominated by prostitution, especially after 1945. The reason being that during World War II, the area was only slightly damaged by bombs, and that many of the hotels located there were used by the US occupation forces for the accommodation of military personnel. The great poverty of the German population and the in comparison very wealthy US soldiers formed the sociocultural background for the emergence of the red light district at this point. During the Cold War era, American soldiers referred to it as Kaiserstraße, or K-Street.

There are a number of brothels in Frankfurt's Bahnhofsviertel. In 1969, the Frankfurt contractors received Willi Schütz's approval for the opening of the first large brothel at 49-53 Elbestraße. The project was supported by the then Frankfurt police chief Gerhard Littmann, who saw in the creation of an Eros Center in the vicinity of the city the only way to deal with the numerous complaints about "commercial malnutrition" in residential areas. The 180-room establishment now bears the name Crazy Sexy and is the largest brothel in Germany. In 2013, five percent of prostitutes came from Germany; most came from Eastern Europe, Latin America or Asia. The Rote Haus at 34 Taunusstrasse has six floors and 67 rooms. There are 14 brothels in the station district.

In the neighborhood there are occasionally large raids by the police. Counseling centers include the Diakonisches Werk operated Tamara project under the guidance of Doña Carmen.

== Economy ==
Air China and Syrian Arab Airlines operate their Frankfurt offices in a facility in Bahnhofsviertel. Other airlines with Frankfurt offices in Bahnhofsviertel include Aeroflot, China Airlines, and Iran Air.

== Gallery ==
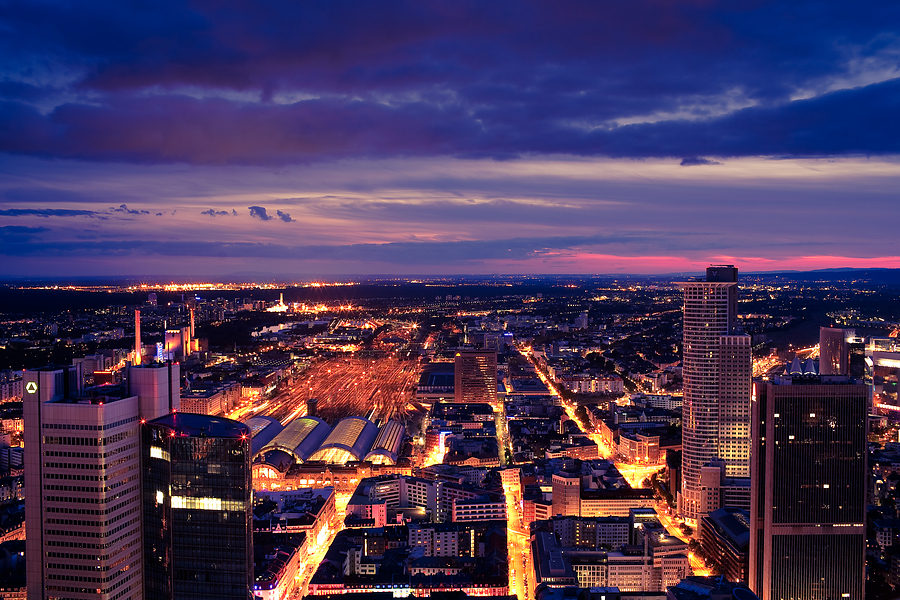
Bahnhofsviertel as seen from the Main Tower

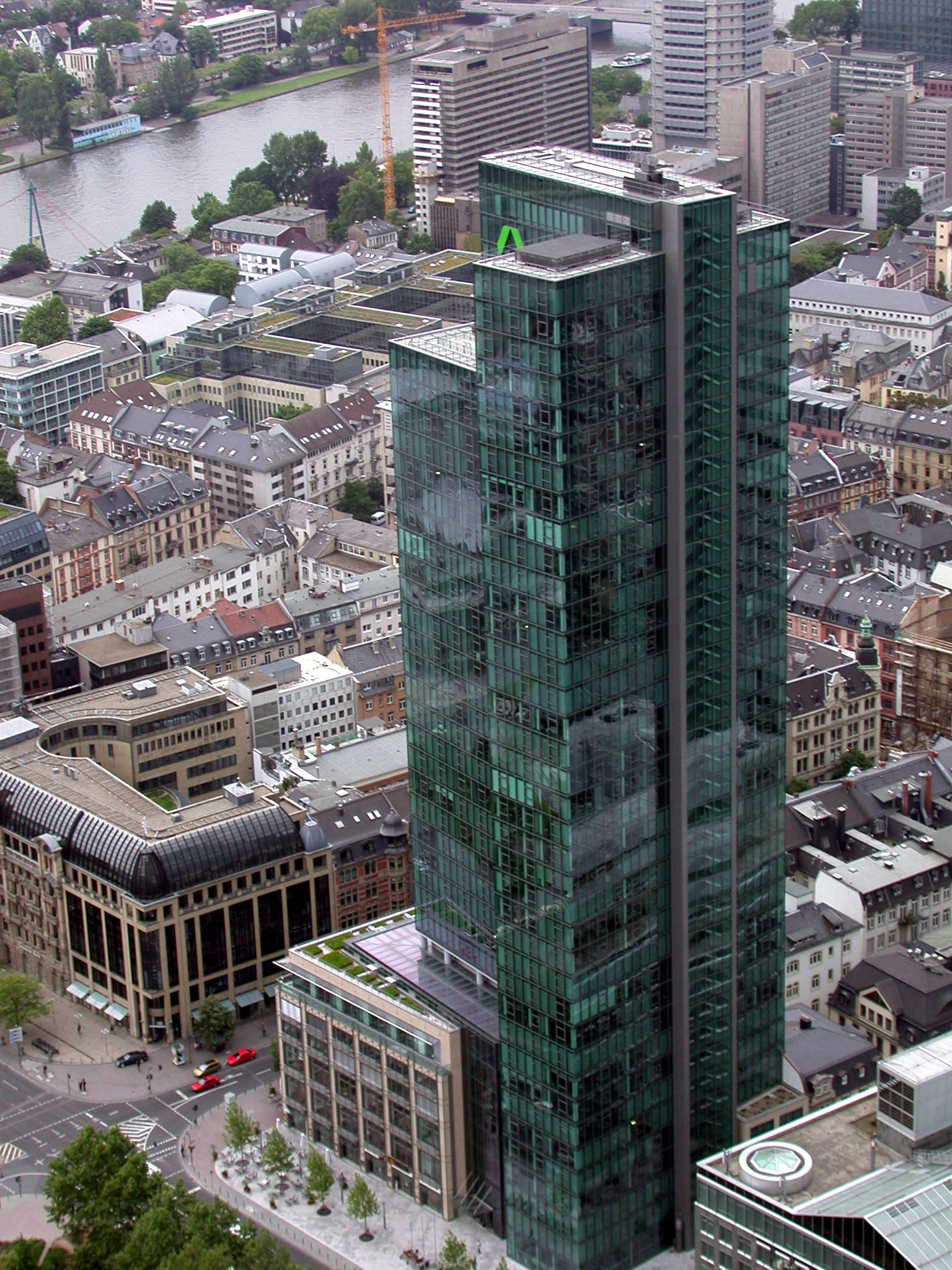
Bird's eye view of the Bahnhofsviertel

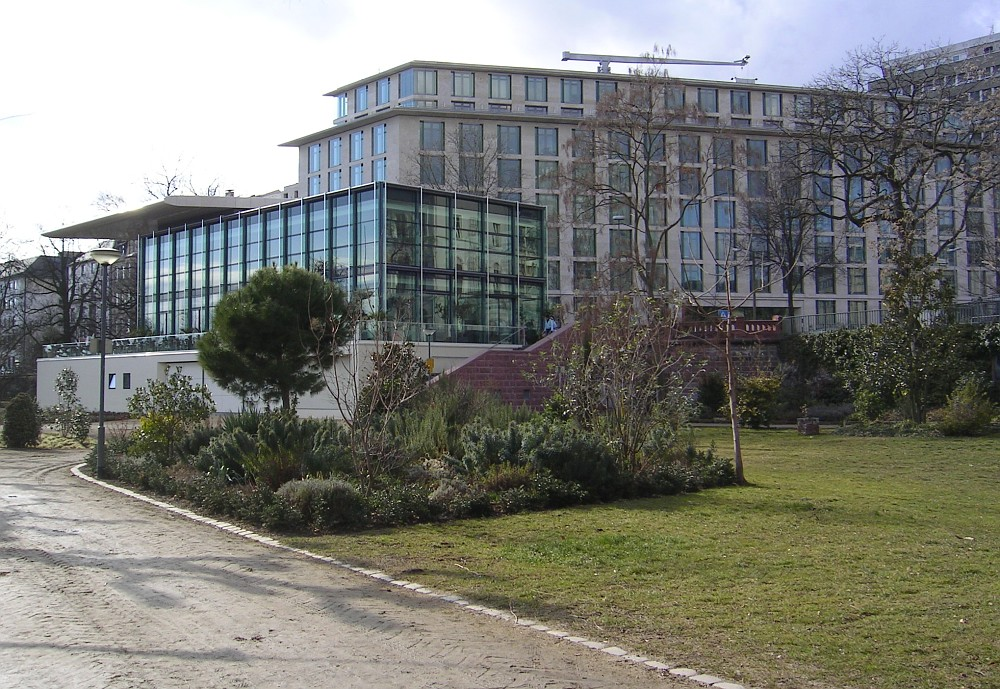
The Nizza on the banks of the Main

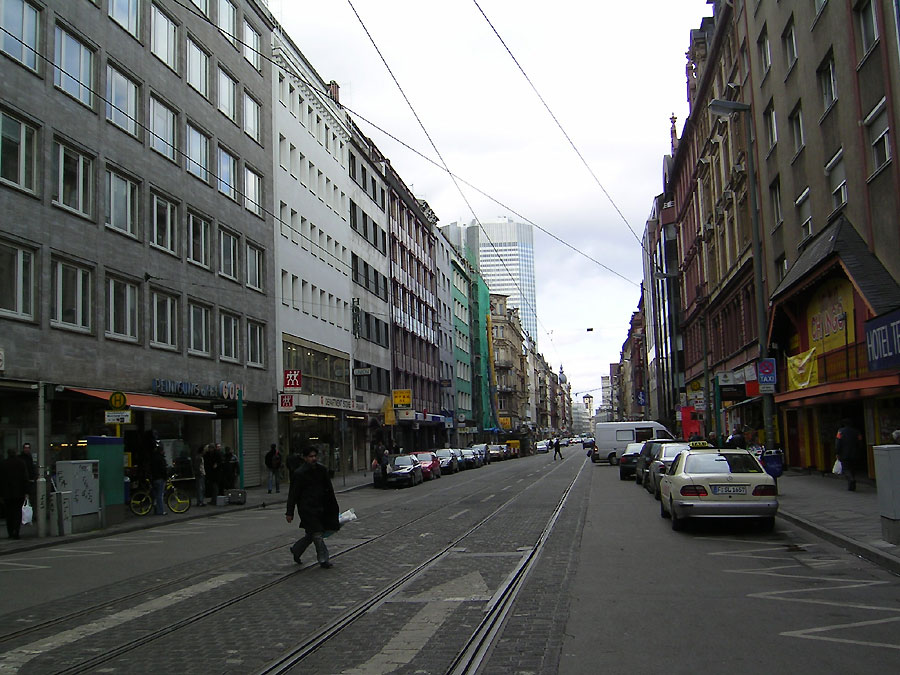
Münchener Straße, a view in the direction of Willy-Brandt-Platz

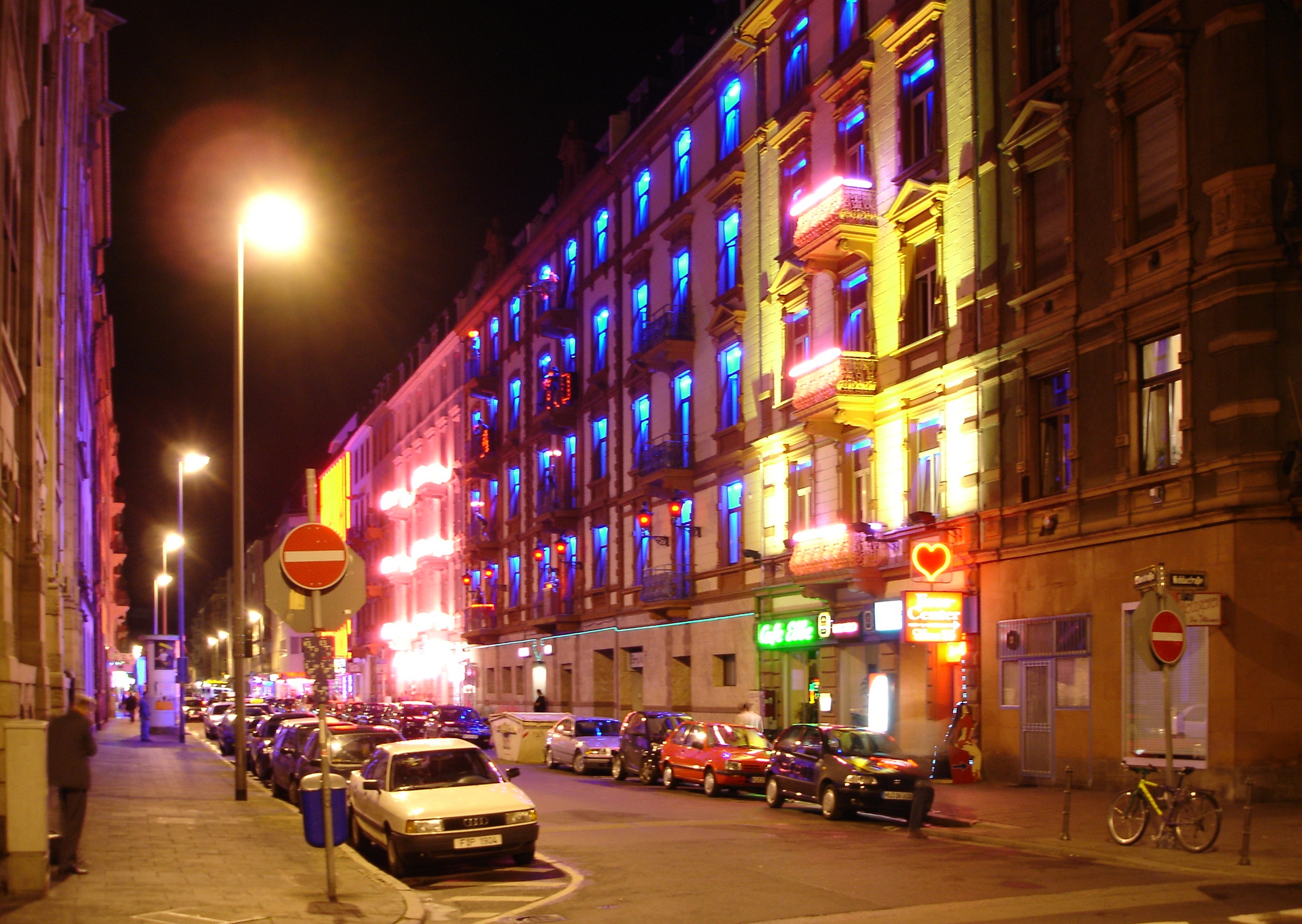
The red light district of Frankfurt at night
