= Trams in Frankfurt am Main =

Tram system of Frankfurt am Main, Hesse, Germany

Coordinates: 50°06′28″N 08°39′53″E

Frankfurt am Main tramway network
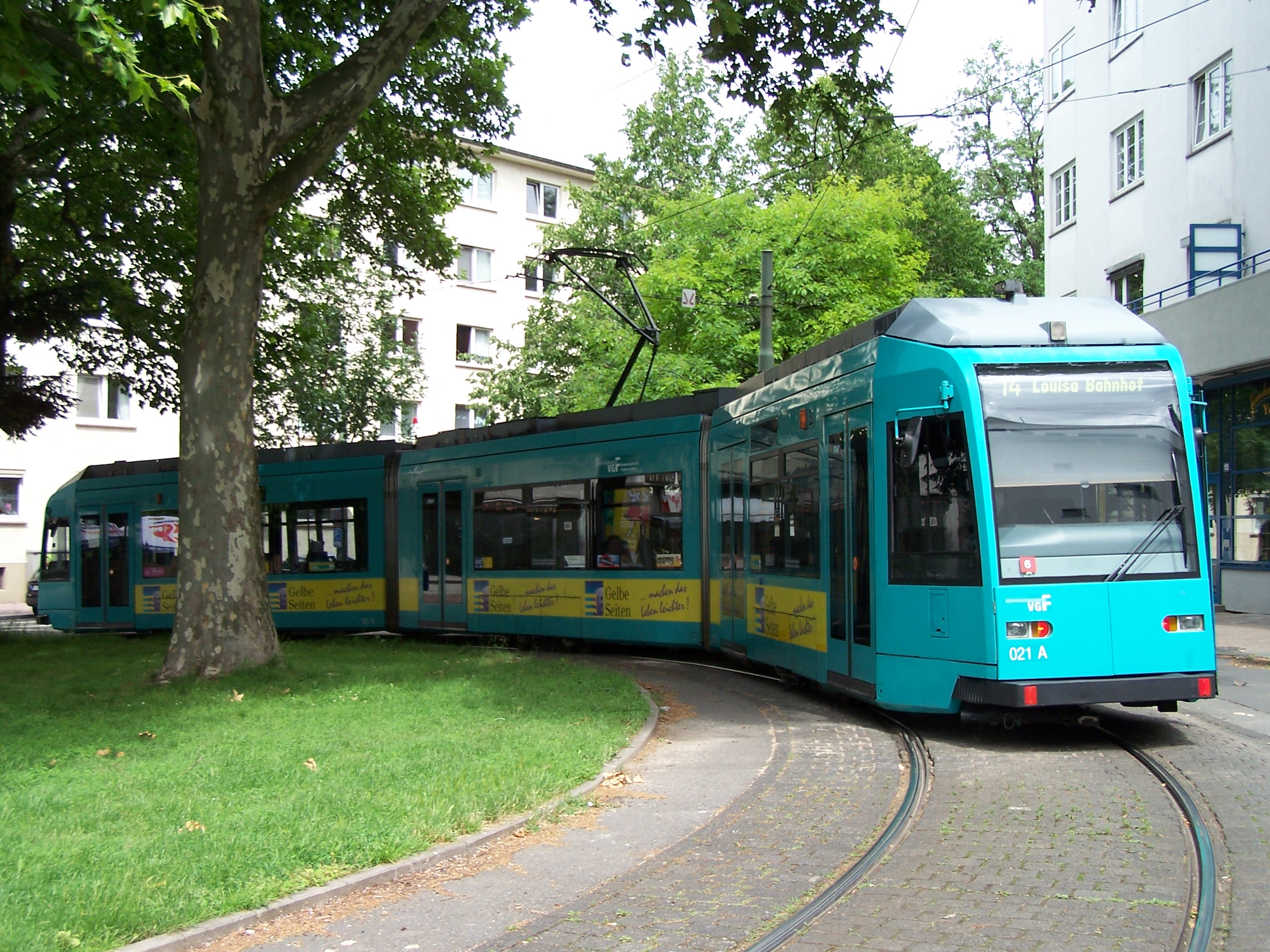
- Frankfurt am Main type R tram no. 021 at Ernst-May-Platz, Bornheim, 2007

Operation
- Locale: Frankfurt am Main, Hesse, Germany

Statistics
Horse tram era: 1872–1904
- Operators: Frankfurter Trambahn-Gesellschaft; (1872–1897); Frankfurter Lokalbahn; (1888); City of Frankfurt; (1898–1904)
- Track gauge: 1,435 mm (4 ft 8 1/2 in) standard gauge
- Propulsion system: Horses
Steam tram era: 1888–1929
- Operators: Frankfurter Lokalbahn; (1888–1901); Frankfurter Waldbahn; (1889–1898); City of Frankfurt; (1899–1929)
- Track gauge: 1,435 mm (4 ft 8 1/2 in)
- Propulsion system: Steam trams
Electric tram era: since 1884
- Status: Operational
- Routes: 10 & 1 heritage streetcar line
- Operators: Frankfurt-Offenbacher Trambahn-Gesellschaft; (1884–1905); City of Frankfurt; (1898–2009); Stadtwerke Verkehrsgesellschaft Frankfurt am Main; (since 2009)
- Track gauge: 1,000 mm (3 ft 3 3/8 in); (1884–1905/06); 1,435 mm (4 ft 8 1/2 in); (since 1905/06)
- Propulsion system: Electricity
- Electrification: 600 V DC
- Stock: 124 trams; 12 heritage trams; 8 trailers
- Route length: 68.67 km (42.7 mi)
- Stops: 141
- 66.9 million (2023)
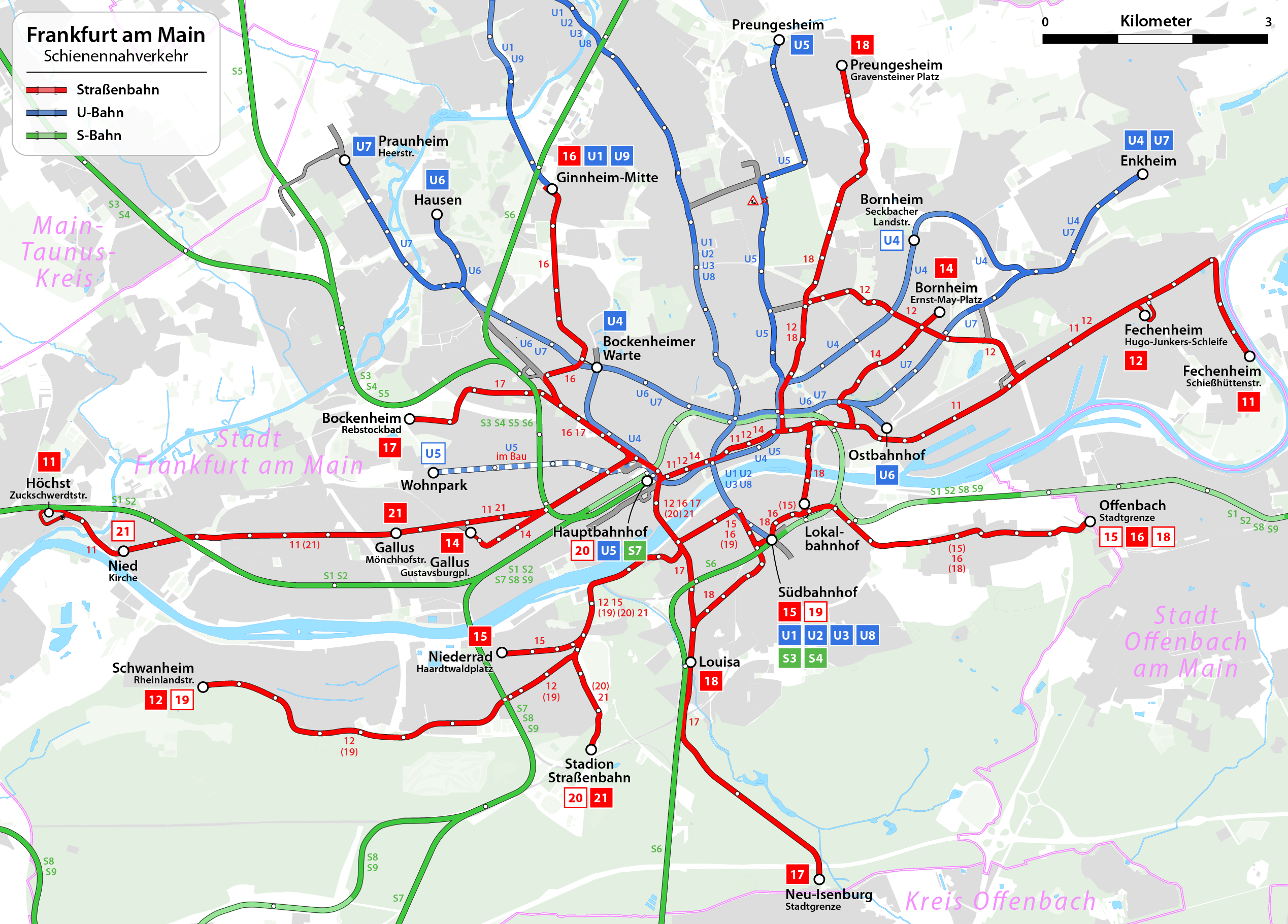
- Frankfurt am Main tramway network, 2011
- Website: http://www.vgf-ffm.de/en/home/ VerkehrsGesellschaft Frankfurt am Main (in English)

The Frankfurt am Main tramway network is a network of tramways forming a major part of the public transport system in Frankfurt am Main, a city in the federal state of Hesse, Germany.

As of 2023, there were 10 tram lines, along with two special lines and one heritage tourist tramline. The network had 141 stops, and a total route length of 68.67 kilometres (42.67 mi). In the same year, the network carried 66.9 million passengers.

== History ==
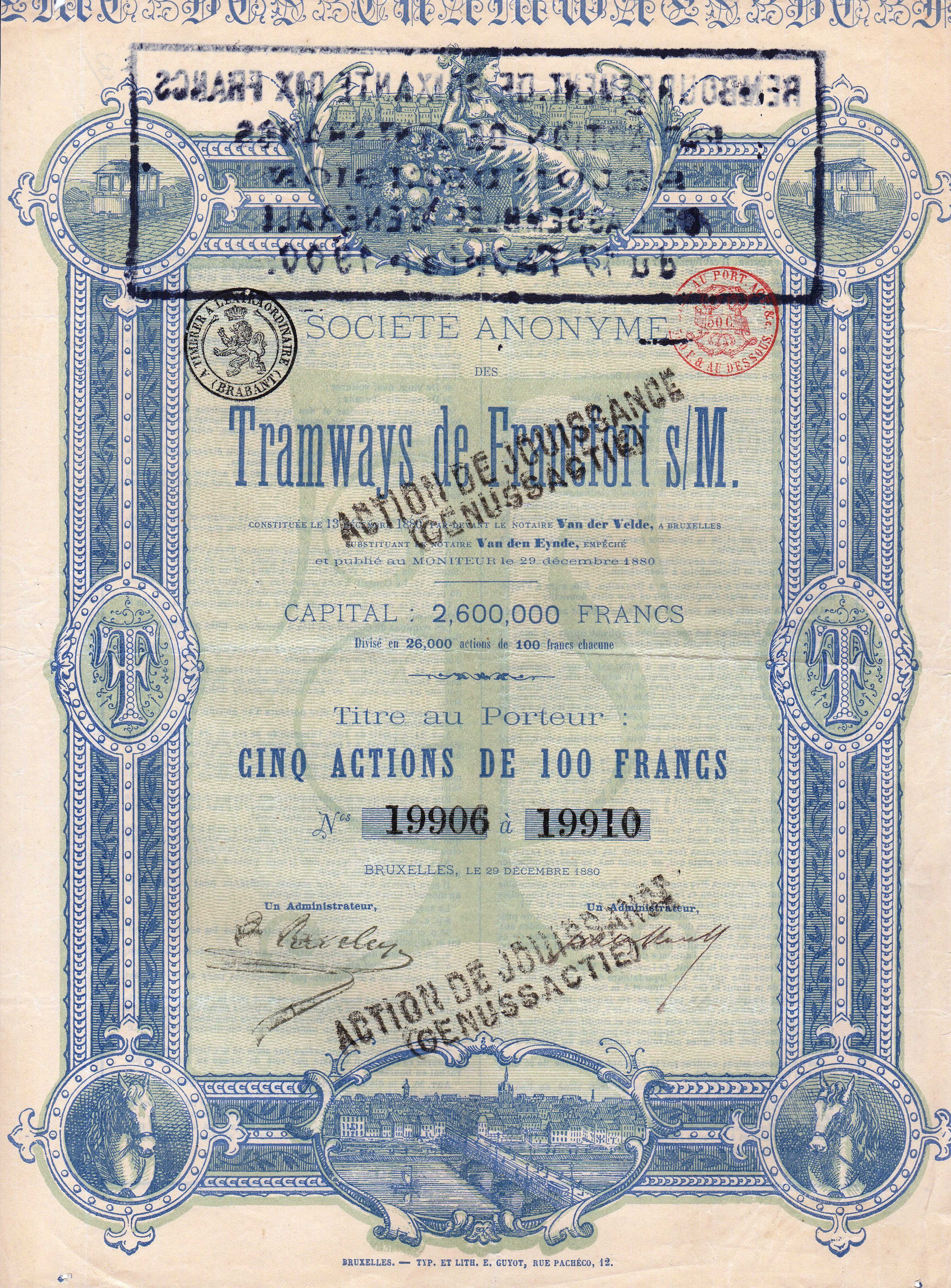
Belgian share of the Frankfurter Trambahn-Gesellschaft, issued 1880

The network is the oldest light rail system in the city, the first horse tram lines having started operations on 19 May 1872. It includes one of the first electric tramways in the world, with the first electrified tram line starting in 1884.

=== Frankfurt Trambahn-Gesellschaft ===
The Frankfurt Trambahn-Gesellschaft (FTG), founded in 1872 as a subsidiary of the Brussels-based company F. de la Hault & Cie, introduced tram traffic with horse trams in Frankfurt. On 19 May 1872 they opened the first line with horses as draft animals from Schönhof in the northwestern neighboring town of Bockenheim on the Bockenheimer Warte, through the Westend on the Bockenheimer highway and today's Opernplatz to the Hauptwache.

The FTG opted for tracks in a gauge of 1,435 mm (4 ft 8 1/2 in), as it was then also common in the railway, the so-called standard gauge. The decision made at that time is still valid until today, all Frankfurt street and subway lines have this track, even if the draft horses were long ago displaced by electric railcars.

The first line was extended a short time later on the Zeil towards the east and reached in 1875 the Hanau station. From 1879, a second line from Bornheim (at the clock tower), which had been incorporated two years before, led over the Sandweg to Friedberger Anlage, and a year later to the Westbahnhof. This line was extended on 24 October 1881 to the Kirchner school at the Hohen Brunnen. Also in 1881 the first time horse trolleys drove across the river Main to Sachsenhausen, since 1882 trains have been going to the Nordend.

The city of Rödelheim, located northwest of Frankfurt, was connected to the horse tramway in 1889. However, the line led only to the Schönhof; at first there was no connection to the original line that began there, since the route of the Main-Weser-Bahn was there and the passenger-occupied horse-drawn carriages were not allowed to cross at ground level. Only with the construction of the Breitenbach Bridge in 1915 was a continuous line from Rödelheim to the city center created.

In the 1890s more routes followed through the city center and the fast-growing Wilhelminian era belt. From 1892, horse-drawn trams ran to the main cemetery, from 1895 to the Galluswarte.

In 1898, FTG had reached 30 km (19 mi) of the tram lines and had 16 tram lines in total.

=== The first electric trams ===
In 1882, an Offenbach consortium applied for permission to build an electric tram from Sachsenhausen to Offenbach. It was a real pioneer project as it was to become one of the first electric trams ever. Only a year earlier, on 16 May 1881, the world's first electrically operated test track in Lichterfelde near Berlin had opened for traffic, and on 1 May 1882 the second from Charlottenburg to the restaurant Spandauer Bock. Now, as in Berlin with the participation of Siemens & Halske, an electric tram under commercial conditions should prove its suitability commercially and transport passengers between Frankfurt and Offenbach. At the end of 1883, the concession was granted and soon after the consortium started construction and founded an operating company, the Frankfurt-Offenbach Tramway Society (FOTG). On 18 February and 10 April 1884 the 6.7 km (4.2 mi) long route was opened.

The route began at the Sachsenhaus side of the Old Bridge and ran on the Offenbacher road and through the community Oberrad to the Prussian-Hessian border. From there, the tram went through Offenbach, over Frankfurter Straße and the marketplace to Mathildenplatz. The depot with its own power plant and company office was located in Oberrad at the Buchrainplatz. The FOTG was the only tram operator in the Frankfurt area to opt for the narrower gauge of 1,000 mm (3 ft 3 3/8 in) metre gauge. The railways reached a respectable for that time conditions speed of about 20 km/h (12 mph).

Since there was still no public power supply, for the operation of the railway the construction of its own coal-fired power plant was necessary, which also delivered electricity for the first time to businesses and private households in Oberrad. The power plant was in operation during the entire period of operation of the FOTG from 1884 to 1906.

=== Eschersheimer Lokalbahn ===
On 12 May 1888 the Frankfurter Lokalbahn AG (FLAG) opened a horse tram line from Frankfurt city center to Eschersheim. The route led from the Eschenheimer Tor on the northern edge of the city center on the Eschersheimer road to the neighboring village about 5 km (3.1 mi) north. The single-track line ended at the former level crossing of the Main-Weser-Bahn, nearby in the street Im Wörth was the depot of the new operator. The FLAG also decided on a gauge of 1,435 mm (4 ft 8 1/2 in), although initially there was no track connection to the horse trams of the FTG. In the same year, the FLAG replaced the horses by more efficient steam locomotives, the Eschersheimer Lokalbahn was thus the first steam tram in Frankfurt.

=== Waldbahn ===
Another private company, Hostmann & Cie. from Hanover, received in 1887 the concession to build railway lines in the south of the city and to operate them for a period of 35 years. The tracks were opened on 5 February and 18 April 1889. It began at two starting points in Sachsenhausen, the Untermain Bridge and the Lokalbahnhof, led over the Mörfelder highway to the southwest and split into three branches that led to Niederrad, Neu-Isenburg and Schwanheim.

The Waldbahn was operated as a standard gauge steam tramway. The steam locomotives used caused displeasure among the residents of the streets in Sachsenhausen and were the reason why the line was not allowed to operate into Frankfurt city center. The routes were predominantly single track and were partly in the street, partly on its own railway body. The company had depots at the termini in Niederrad, Schwanheim and Neu-Isenburg, and in Textorstraße in Sachsenhausen. At night, a brisk freight traffic was operated on the routes.

=== Other occasions ===
On the occasion of the International Electricity Fair in 1891, the companies Schuckert & Co. on the route Kaiserstraße – Mainkai and the company Siemens & Halske on the route Hauptbahnhof – Opera Square demonstrated electric trams. While the Schuckert car was supplied with power from a sub-line and also from a catenary by means of a pantograph, the Siemens & Halske rail company drew its power from accumulators. From 1 May 1897 accumulator trams of the Frankfurt tramway company operated experimentally between the main train station and the Galluswarte. The main reason for these attempts were critical voices, which fought against the catenary of an electric tram because of the feared "blighting the cityscape", although the experience had already clearly demonstrated the technical superiority of the trolley system. For example, the heavy accumulator vehicles resulted in considerable damage to the tracks of the horse tram designed only for low axle load.

The spa town Bad Homburg vor der Höhe in the North of Frankfurt received an electric tram on 26 July 1899. Their gauge was 1,435 mm (4 ft 8 1/2 in), as in Frankfurt. The Frankfurt Lokalbahn AG led over their distance to Oberursel for years a continuous line.

The Frankfurt Lokalbahn AG was able to open in October 1899 in addition to its steam tram in the Eschersheimer highway a second route: the so-called mountain railway began at the station Oberursel the Homburger Bahn and ran over 4.5 km (2.8 mi) to the terminus Hohemark in the Taunus. The Oberurseler route was initially operated with steam.

=== Frankfurt trams ===
In view of the success of the private tram operators, the city administration also began to be interested in setting up its own tram network. The electrical drive, which reached the stage of technical efficiency at the end of the 1890s, caused an investment wave in many cities around the world. Everywhere it was necessary to convert the existing horse-drawn railway networks to the considerably more efficient electrical operation. The gauges selected by the horse tram decades ago were retained in most cases, so that a mixed operation of horse and electric trains was possible. The electric railways now in use everywhere, along with the impending turn of the century, provided many city dwellers with a boost of progress.

The city of Frankfurt received the concession for the operation of electric trams on 20 January 1898. Since the horse train network of FTG was already well developed, it was decided against the competing construction of its own network, but on 1 January 1898 without further ado they took over the private operator and his tram lines. Just one year later, the first line was switched to electric operation.

In 1899, the city also took over the Waldbahn, but initially continued to use steam traction on it. Only in 1929 the lines were electrified to Schwanheim and Neu-Isenburg and included in the urban tram network. The Niederräder line had already been replaced in 1907 by a new urban line.

In 1901, the city bought the Eschersheim local railway for 500,000 marks from the FLAG. In the same year, the tram line 13 was extended to Holzhausenstraße, but steam trains continued to drive the total distance between Eschersheimer Tor and Eschersheim. In 1908, the section Holzhausenstraße-Eschersheim was electrified and integrated into the urban network.

To electrify the tram network of the horse tram, the city of Frankfurt transferred the right to construction and operation until 1 April 1900 to the companies Siemens & Halske and Brown, Boveri & Cie, and to take care of the operation afterwards themselves. They decided on a system already proven in other cities with a single-pole electric catenary system made by Siemens. The DC with a driving voltage of 600 volts was generated in purpose built substations. The vehicles received Lyra pantographs, which were replaced only in the Second World War because of the lower sparking by pantograph collectors.

The first test drive of the electric tram in Frankfurt was carried out on 22 March 1899 from Sachsenhäuser Depot, the first own depot of the urban tram, to Bornheim and back, then on the Mörfelder highway to Palmengarten and from there back to Sachsenhausen.

A few days later, on 10 April 1899, the first electrified line of the urban tram was put into operation. The starting point was the eastern entrance of the Palmengarten on the Siesmayerstraße, from there it went over the Feldbergstraße, the Grüneburgweg and the Reuterweg to the Opernplatz, then over the Neue Mainzer Straße and the Untermainbrücke to the Schweizer Platz. From there, first the Mörfelder Landstraße, then the Darmstädter Landstraße was used to local railway station, then to cross the Main via Obermainbrücke (now Ignatz-Bubis-bridge) and the Lange Straße, the Zeil, the Sandweg, the Arnsburger Straße and the Berger road to reach the destination Bornheim school. Since the entire route had a length of 11 kilometres (6.8 mi), established two lines whose endpoints were at the local station.

From 25 July 1899, the second route in Frankfurt could be driven by electric railcar; the line led from the Glauburgstraße to the Lokalbahnhof. The central Bockenheimer Depot was built at the Bockenheimer Warte. Towards the end of the year 1900, 15 lines had already been converted to electrical operation, at the end of 1901 it was 17. The last three horse-drawn railway lines, the routes from Bockenheimer Warte to Bockenheimer Bahnhof, Schönhof and Rödelheim were electrified on 18 June 1904.

In 1906, the cities of Frankfurt and Offenbach took over the line of the FOTG, which remained a foreign body in the network due to their deviating gauge and their exotic drive technology. The track was umgespurt on standard gauge, provided with modern overhead lines and went as a jointly operated line 16 in the network of electric trams.

In addition to the regular lines in Frankfurt on 1 March 1901 was the first major German city, an electric postal streetcars of the Reich Post established that until 31 December 1951, the transport of parcels and letters between the Post Office 9 at the main station and the main post office on the Zeil, at times also with the post office at the Ostbahnhof worried.

Also in the neighboring town of Offenbach, the city administration was now involved in tram traffic. In addition to the redrawn FOTG route, Offenbach also built two inner-city lines: from line 190, line 26 operated from the market square to Bürgel, the 27 from 1908 from Goethestrasse to the main station. The community line 16 was extended to Offenbach cemetery. For about 60 years there was an independent electric tram network in Offenbach.

The FLAG, which had sold its Eschersheimer Lokalbahn to the city in 1901, now saw its task in the creation of a connection between the freshly electrified Frankfurt tram network and the isolated routes in Bad Homburg and Oberursel. Complicated negotiations and approval procedures delayed the start of construction by several years. In May 1910, the two routes were finally put into operation. They were not licensed as a tram but as a tram-like narrow-gauge railway, and indeed ran over long distances like a railroad off the roads. The starting point of both lines was Heddernheim station, where the city had meanwhile extended the Eschersheimer line. The FLAG was able to use the now urban tracks in the Eschersheimer Landstraße and thus created direct connections from Oberursel and Homburg to Frankfurt city center. The terminus was at the Schauspielhaus. Also in Homburg, the tracks of the local tram were shared, the Homburger endpoint was in the center of the small town, on the market square. The Oberurseler mountain railway was electrified and part of the new connection. The lines of the FLAG wore the numbers 24 (Oberursel) and 25 (Bad Homburg). In Bommersheim near Oberursel a new depot was created. The FLAG was acquired by Lahmeyer in 1912 and has since belonged to the same owner as the Homburger Straßenbahn. After the decommissioning of the Homburg network and the Saalburgbahn 1935 the FLAG operated another 20 years of tram traffic in Bad Homburg.

After the electrification of all tram routes to 1904, the tram network continued to grow rapidly: In the growing inner city itself, numerous new connections were created until 1910, incorporated suburbs received in the subsequent period until the early 1930s, a tram connection. In 1929, the lines of the Frankfurt forest railway were electrified and incorporated into the tram network. In 1931, the new Ernst May settlement was connected to Bornheimer Hang. In 1938, the number of Frankfurt tram lines reached its peak at 32, the network had reached at this time an extension of about 125 km.

Towards the end of the 1920s, the first experiments began to make tram operation more attractive. From Milan, in 1929, a Peter Witt open-top car was lent by the Azienda Trasporti Milanesi and extensively tested on the line 23, but he could not fully satisfy because of the constructive differences to the biaxial cars. In particular, the principle of passenger flow (get in the back, go through, get off the front) was still foreign to the Frankfurters, it could only prevail in the 50s with the delivery of the large-capacity cars of the L series. From the experience with this exotene resulted in further attempts to make the operation more economical. A D-railcar was firmly connected in 1930 with a d-sidecar to save a conductor per train can, to speed up the passenger change and electropneumatic remote controllable doors were installed. However, the concept could not prevail, so that the designated Dd vehicle remained a unique piece and was used until the outbreak of World War II mainly for city tours. Also in 1931 a D-railcar with another D-railcar were connected (type DD) to receive a four-axle twin-rail car. He was used until the beginning of the war on the lines 0, 1, 6 and 17.

=== 20th century ===
The World War II was also noticeable for the tram. Most of the crew were drafted into military service from 1940 onwards. The use of foreign workers from occupied Western European countries and high-speed students helped offset this temporarily, while urban bus transport came to a virtual standstill due to fuel and vehicle shortages. With the beginning of the Allied air raids on Frankfurt am Main around 1943, the tram traffic was increasingly impaired. In the heavy air raids in 1944, a medium-sized part of the rolling stock and almost all depots in the city center was destroyed, the damaged vehicles received could mostly only be makeshift driven due to the lack of spare parts. To lessen the biggest deficiencies, Frankfurt received 1944 20 Kriegsstraßenbahnwagen of the wagon factory Fuchs.

A special episode during World War II represented the freight traffic, which was established by the Frankfurter and Offenbacher tram to maintain the supply of the population with food and later also heating material (coke) in addition to passenger transport. Goods to be transported were transported in converted side wagons of the types cu and du, for the loading of food were laid specifically on the yard of the Frankfurt wholesale market tram tracks. In contrast, the goods line 26, which runs between the Frankfurt Theaterplatz and the Offenbacher Alte Friedhof, could be used by anyone with luggage or freight. The cargo found place in converted sidecar, while their owners in the railcar could participate in the ride.

With the conquest of Frankfurt by the United States Army on 25 March 1945, the tram traffic came to a complete halt. The demolition of all Mainbrücken by the Wehrmacht shortly before the end of the war had divided the network in two, the use of steel trams of types F and H as anti-tank devices, as it had happened in Berlin and other cities, but could be prevented by the tram personnel.

Already on 24 May 1945 reversed two tram lines between Nied and Bornheim. After the clearing of the city center and the restoration of tracks and overhead line was already in 1946 on most routes a modest tram traffic to be carried out, which, however, was still affected by the blown Main bridges and a chronic vehicle shortage. Only on the not completely blown up Wilhelmsbrücke (today's peace bridge) a single track was available, on which because of the strong military traffic exclusively at night cars could change the Mainseite.

Between summer 1945 and the end of 1950, there were also two special lines, the use of which was reserved exclusively for members of the Allied armed forces. The designated as "Roundup" lines 13 and 39 connected the housed in the IG Farben Building American headquarters with the central station and Heddernheim (line 13) and Preungesheim (line 39). On both lines only the comfortable pre-war series F, G and H were used, which – in contrast to the remaining vehicles – were also in optimal state of preservation. At times, the vehicles had even been painted olive green with colors from army remnants to make them more easily distinguishable from conventional streetcars. The trains of the Roundup Lines were the only trams that were allowed to pass through the restricted area around the I.G. Farben House on the Eschersheimer Landstraße and the Reuterweg. The lines 23, 24 and 25 from the city center in the direction of Heddernheim and Taunus had until June 1948 bypass the restricted area on the Eckenheimer highway and built in 1945 track on the Marbachweg.

The last reconstruction measures included the restoration of the main bridges in the city center. After 1949 the upper and Untermainbrücke were again drivable for streetcars, followed in 1951 instead of the former Wilhelmsbrücke the newly built Friedensbrücke.

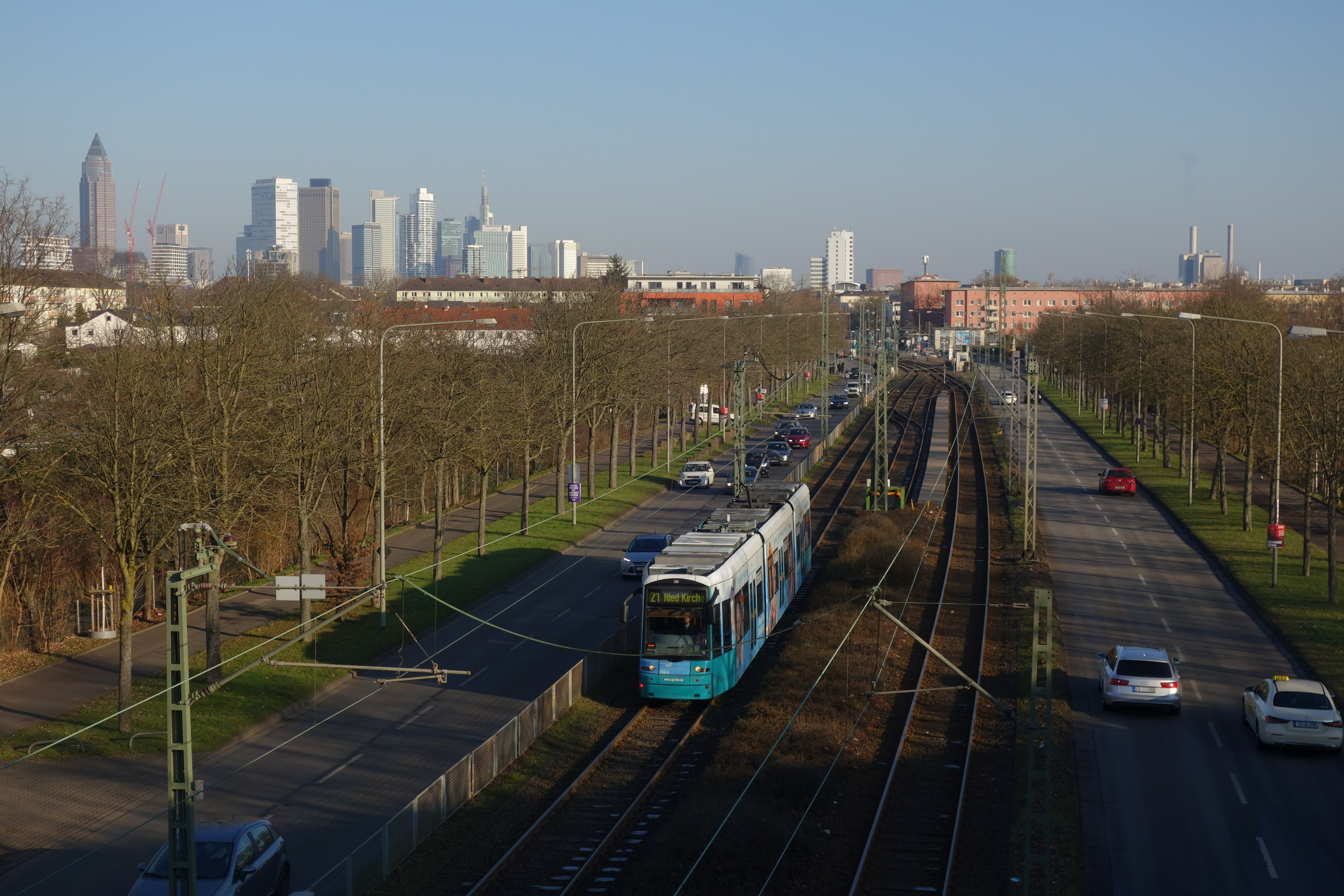
S-type wagon as line 21 heading westward for Nied on Mainzer Landstraße in Gallus

The 1950s, finally, were characterized by recent gaps and extensions. On 22 January 1953 the extension that was planned before the war from Nied to Höchst and a connection from Bornheim to Riederwald (today's line 12) was opened on 31 March 1957 finally followed the commissioning of the route in the then still independent Enkheim – it should remain for over 40 years, the last network expansion of the tram. 1955 was also the first major decommissioning, the routes to the South Cemetery and the Palm Garden were set on 21 May 1955.

At the same time, the urgently needed modernization of the vehicle park took place. In 1955, the first two Düwag class L large-capacity vehicles went into operation. In 1959, the first articulated railcars of the M series followed.

For many decades in the mid-20th century, it was the firm policy that Frankfurt's trams would eventually be phased out and replaced by buses and extensions of the U-Bahn.

=== Closure ===
With the start of construction of the Frankfurt U-Bahn, closures began in 1963 on the tram network. Underground and S-Bahn would replace the trams in the medium completely. The first metro line was opened in 1968, the second in 1974, the central S-Bahn tunnel 1978. Any progress in the rail network led to the closure of tram lines in order to avoid inefficient parallel traffic. With the opening of the third metro line in 1986, the "rail-free city" should be created: The tram should – to a predominant part replacement – completely disappear from the city center, the previous track surfaces for "appreciation" of the streets and places are used. This led to increasing criticism of this concept, culminating in public protests. Within a year, nearly 60,000 people signed for the preservation of the tram lines. Newspapers, radio and television devoted to the conflict. Even personalities like Professor Bernhard Grzimek and the subsequent DGB regional chairman Dieter Hooge expressed public criticism of the concept. As a result of citizen protests, the Regierungspräsidium Darmstadt rejected on 27 May 1986, the decommissioning of the old town stretch from. The Frankfurt Mayor Wolfram Brück criticized this decision and threatened with the withdrawal of Frankfurt from the Frankfurter Verkehrsverbund (FVV). Two days before the scheduled opening of the new subway route shifted bridge the opening of the underground indefinitely and banned all opening ceremonies. Only a few weeks later signaled the CDU's willingness to get the old town route bus No. 11. In turn, the provincial government Hartmut Wierscher renounced the maintenance of three additional lines. The preservation of the old town route finally ushered in a turning point in urban transport policy.

Almost simultaneously with the decision to build the subway began in the 60s, the plans for the construction of a rapid-transit railway, which should connect cities and municipalities within a radius of 30 km to the city. The centerpiece of the S-Bahn was a 6-kilometer-long tunnel under Frankfurt's city center, which was to accommodate the then 14 regional railways, which had previously ended at the main station. In 1962, the construction of this then V-Bahn route was decided as a joint project by the city of Frankfurt am Main and the Deutsche Bundesbahn.

In 1969, the construction began, which brought another major cut in the tram network from 1971 with: The entire square in front of the main station gave way to a huge excavation, which divided the network in the western part of the city in half and an elaborate rail replacement traffic between the square the Republic and the south entrance of the central station. In 1970, it began the construction of the underground under the Berger road in the direction of Bornheim. Therefore, the leading via Bornheim to Seckbach tram line 2 was set and replaced between Bornheim and Seckbach by a bus line.

An important prerequisite for the operation of the rapid-transit railway was the establishment of the Frankfurt transport association (FVV) in 1974, through which the tariff structure of Stadtwerke Frankfurt (as operator of trams, subways and city buses) and the German Federal Railways, which the regional railways operation, has been standardized. From the timetable change on 26 May 1974, passengers were able to use both public transport networks with a common ticket.

The shareholders of the FVV had agreed to operate for economic reasons, no parallel traffic of different means of transport, but in particular to stop the tram traffic in the course of the expansion of the high-speed rail lines gradually. As a result, the tram route from Berkersheim to the main station (line 13) was shut down on 25 February 1978 because it ran between Preungesheim and central station parallel to the new urban railway line U5. Against decommissioning formed a citizens' initiative Save the 13, which began years without success for the resumption of the operation. A short time later, on 11 March 1978, the solemn farewell of the last two-axle railcar from the line operation took place.

With the opening of the Frankfurt S-Bahn on 27 May 1978, the routes to Griesheim (line 14) and Rödelheim (line 23) and the above-ground light rail connection between Hauptwache and central station (lines A3 and A4) were set. At the same time, the Zeilstrecke was shut down due to the construction of the S-Bahn tunnel and redirected traffic in neighboring streets.

After completion of the three subway and the S-Bahn tunnels, all tram routes in the city center should be shut down. The municipal change of government in 1977 did not alter this plan, which took concrete shape under the new Lord Mayor Walter Wallmann in the form of the development concept "Rail-free city center".

Due to the decommissioning of "parallel" trams it was accepted that this meant that many passengers had direct connections. Despite changing trains, they should have shorter travel times than before. However, it should prove that the "avoidance of parallel traffic" and the "rail-free city center" met with resistance.

=== Schienenfreie Innenstadt ===
With the opening of the subway route Bockenheim-Zoo (C-Line) planned for 27 September 1986, all tram routes in the inner city were to be shut down and the relevant streets upgraded in terms of urban development. Only a branch line to Konstablerwache should be temporarily preserved as a feeder for S-Bahn and subway.

Against these plans formed a citizens' initiative, which collected nearly 60,000 signatures for the maintenance of the tram routes within one year. The competent government president then rejected the end of August 1986 from the decommissioning and demanded the receipt of three lines on the Old Town route.

The new Lord Mayor Wolfram Brück, who was elected on 14 August 1986, escalated the conflict in a manner he later acknowledged as a grave political mistake. He canceled the opening of the new subway line two days before the scheduled date and prohibited all public and private celebrations planned for the occasion. At the same time he threatened with the withdrawal of Frankfurt from the Frankfurt Transport Association (FVV), whose new winter timetable already no longer contained the tram lines to be decommissioned. The dispute over the completed, but currently unused subway line made headlines nationwide.

At the beginning of October, the parties to the conflict got involved. The compromise was to maintain the old city route with the line 11, but to shut down all other inner city lines as planned. As a concession to the concept, to receive the tram only as a feeder to the high-speed railway, the line 11 was given its final stop on the south side of the main station and drove through a loop to the subway station Zoo. With three weeks delay, the new subway was opened on 12 October 1986 without a party. The streetcar line 12 ended now in the large Friedberger road at the Konstablerwache, for which a route section disused since 1978 was reactivated. The new line 11 had daily between 5,000 and 10,000 passengers, despite a cumbersome lines and recurring decommissioning discussions.

=== Modern history ===
When the S-Bahn was opened from Frankfurt to Offenbach in 1995, this should mean the closure of the Offenbacher road segment, which, however, by citizen protests from Oberrad and transport initiatives (including Pro Bahn and the civic association "DALLES"), the attempted with special tours, to make the population aware of the tradition of the compound, could be prevented. In the follow-up period the tram by Offenbach always more than was "unwanted" viewed. To monitor the speed limit of 7 km/h (4.3 mph) in the pedestrian area of Offenbach Marktplatz, a speed measuring system was set up specifically for the tram by Offenbach. It was finally closed on 1 June 1996 to Offenbach Marktplatz.

But since the beginning of the 1990s, the direction of Frankfurt's urban traffic policy has changed and its tramways have been renovated and expanded, with a new route, Line 18, opening in 2011. Although the various lines were founded by a number of private and public operators, all trams are now operated by Verkehrsgesellschaft Frankfurt (VGF, English: Frankfurt Transport Company), and the system is part of the Rhein-Main-Verkehrsverbund (RMV, English: Rhine-Main transport network).

In December 2014, the opening of the new line through the Stresemannallee closed a gap in the southern Mainz network. The approximately one kilometer long route created a direct connection between the stops Stresemannallee / Garden Street and Stresemannallee / Mörfelder highway under construction of a new stop at the S-Bahn station Stresemannallee. On the new line was the line 17, which previously ended at the main station, extended to the city limits of Neu-Isenburg, resulting in a commuter attractive direct connection from the neighboring city to Frankfurt Central Station.

== Future ==
The future for the trams in Frankfurt are under discussion. These include:

- An extension of line 11 from "Zuckschwerdtstraße" to Höchst station
- A new line from central station through "Gutleutstraße" to "Briefzentrum" replacing bus route 37
- A relocation of the former "Waldbahn" line (today's line 12) in Goldstein from the southern outskirts into "Straßburger Straße"
- An extension of line 12 to the Höchst Industrial Park
- A relocation of the old town route from the eastern part of "Battonnstraße" into "Allerheiligenstraße"
- A modernization of line 16 throughout Bockenheim and Ginnheim
- A third route crossing the river Main via "Alte Brücke" from Konstablerwache to Sachsenhausen

In 2005, the city's council was asked to examine whether a tram route to Uni Campus Westend could be built on Mainzer Landstrasse, Taunusanlage, Reuterweg and Bremer Platz, but this was denied in October 2006, because bus route 36 already serves this area in a sufficient way. Furthermore, on "Reuterweg" and "Mainzer Landstraße" two lanes in each direction are needed to cover the high amount of individual traffic and could not be dedicated as a tram line.

The establishment of a tram line to Bad Vilbel is no longer considered by the city council because the tram cars can not operate on gradients greater than 10%, which "Frankfurter Straße" – part of the planned route – includes. In addition, research revealed that a tram on this line would not be significantly quicker than the current bus service.

== Historical routes ==
=== Frankfurt Lokalbahn ===
The route of the Frankfurt local railway in the Eschersheimer highway opened in 1888 and extended to 1910 to Bad Homburg and Oberursel. The route branches north of Heddernheim were always a special feature of the tram network because they had a wider track profile due to the freight traffic there. In order to avoid derailment, only tramcars with widened tires could be used there, which was characterized by a "v" (for "suburban") in the series designation.

In 1968, the line went mostly into the network of the subway and has since been used by the U-Bahn lines U1 to Ginnheim, U2 to Bad Homburg-Gonzenheim and U3 to Oberursel Hohemark.

The extension of the light rail network in 1971 to Bad Homburg meant that the Homburger route "provisionally" had to be withdrawn in the district Gonzenheim, because the previous tram in Bad Homburg narrow city streets drove that were not passable for subway cars.

Until 1978, the tunnel of the Eschersheimer Landstrasse still operated tunnel-engined trams of the series Mt, since then it is used exclusively for subway operation of the lines U1 to U3.

=== Rödelheim ===
In 1889, a horse-drawn railway line was set up from Bockenheimer Schönhof via the Rödelheimer Landstraße to the Niddabruecke in Rödelheim. In 1904, this route was electrified as the last in Frankfurt. 1911 was followed by an extension of the Nidda to Rödelheimer station. Until 1915, it was separated from the rest of the tram network by the Main-Weser-Bahn, because for safety reasons only unoccupied tram cars were allowed to cross the railroad tracks at ground level. It was not until the construction of the Breitenbach Bridge at the Industriehof that it could be connected to the line to the Opernplatz. In 1978, it was shut down on the occasion of the opening of the S-Bahn and replaced by the bus 34.

=== Berkersheim, Eckenheim, Preungesheim ===
The route to Berkersheim went through the fierce disputes over their decommissioning in the city's history.

The first section was opened in 1911 and branched north of the main cemetery from the existing since 1907 route over the Eckenheimer highway. From there it led over then still undeveloped terrain to Marbachweg and shortly afterwards turned into today's Gießener Straße. The route changed there to the Homburger highway and drove them north to the level of Weilbrunnstraße in Preungesheim. 1919 followed by a single-track extension over undeveloped land to the Oberwiesenweg in the northeast of Preungesheim, only in 1925 Berkersheim received a tram connection. A continuation to Bad Vilbel was not realized because of the shortage of materials in the years before the Second World War.

Although incorporation into the Eckenheimer Stadtbahn line opened in 1974 had been considered, the idea was eventually dropped because of operational risks and the limited capacity of the mostly single-track route. The decommissioning of the line between Giessener Straße and Berkersheim took place on 25 February 1978. In Preungesheim the tram was replaced by the city railway line B1 (today's line U5), in Berkersheim they set up as a substitute bus line 39. The official reason for the decommissioning was the construction of the Federal Highway 661, for which a costly underpass should have been built. In fact, the decommissioning, however, was done by pressure of the Frankfurt Transport Association, in the popularly (based on the usual since 1951 line number) Wilde 13 line saw an inadmissible "parallel traffic" to the opened in the same year rapid-transit railway. The decommissioning led for the first time to significant protests by the affected population, years later, the citizens' initiative called "Save the 13" called for the resumption of operations. Only the complete disassembly of the remaining tracks in the early 1980s ended the discussion about the future of the track.

In the form of the new line 18 line in the newly developed Preungesheim housing estate Frankfurter Bogen the tram returned on December 11, 2011, in the area; a continuation to Berkersheim is not provided.

=== Bergen ===
The extension to the then still independent, northeast of Frankfurt lying mountains was taken on 15 October 1913 in operation. Previously, the lines ended at the Lahmeyerstraße in Riederwald. Before decommissioning, the line had been operated until the 1980s by the line 20 from Bornheim. After the line 12 had lost its diameter function in 1986 due to the opening of the C-Line of the subway and the associated decommissioning of the line through the Stephan- and Stiftstraße, she drove instead of ending in Bornheim at the "Prüfling" until Bergen and replaced the line 20. In February 1992, the regular service was closed and the old track laid idle, as the extension of the C-Line to Enkheim required a re-routing of the tracks on the Borsigallee. At the height of the former branch, the Stadtbahn station "Gwinnerstraße" was built. However, the route remained largely as it wanted to use parts of it for the planned extension of the line U4 from Bornheim to Bergen.

The tracks are located at the crossroads with the Gelastraße on the higher lane of private traffic to the north. From the former stop Leonhardsgasse, today's bus stop, the route runs through the Seckbacher Ried. A short time later, the former route crosses the Bitzweg and runs between it and the outskirts of Bergen to the intersection with Wilhelmshöher road, which, coming from Seckbach, crosses the route. From here, the tracks have been rebuilt or overgraded; the section is released today for pedestrians. Only the turning loop on the southwestern edge of Bergen is again preserved and serves today as stop of the bus line 43. Meanwhile, however, there is the intention to reactivate the still-preserved route, whether as a tram or Stadtbahn route is unclear. It would be possible to reactivate as a light rail line with a subsequent tunnel in the Berger old town. Since the superstructure has decayed during the years of decommissioning, a complete renewal of the route is required.

== Current network ==
As of 2022 there were eleven tram lines, among them eight main lines, two rush hour reinforcement lines and one special line in Frankfurt:

Line	Route
Tram 11	Höchst Zuckschwerdtstraße; Mainzer Landstraße – Bahnhofsviertel–/Altstadt – Hanauer Landstraße und Fechenheim; Fechenheim Schießhüttenstraße
Tram 12	Schwanheim Rheinlandstraße; Waldbahn – Bahnhofsviertel-/Altstadt – Kurt-Schumacher-Straße – Bornheim – Hanauer Landstraße; Hugo-Junkers-Straße
Tram 14	Gallus; Mainzer Landstraße – Bahnhofsviertel-/Altstadt – Wittelsbacherallee; Bornheim Ernst-May-Platz
Tram 15	Niederrad Haardtwaldplatz; Niederrad – Sachsenhausen – Offenbacher Landstraße; Offenbach Stadtgrenze (city limits)
Tram 16	Ginnheim; Ginnheim – Bockenheim – Sachsenhausen – Offenbacher Landstraße; Offenbach Stadtgrenze (city limits)
Tram 17	Rebstockbad; Rebstockstrecke – Hauptbahnhof – Waldbahn; Neu-Isenburg Stadtgrenze (city limits)
Tram 18	Preungesheim; Konstablerwache – Südbahnhof; Sachsenhausen Louisa station
Tram 19	Schwanheim Rheinlandstraße; Waldbahn – Niederrad – Sachsenhausen; Sachsenhausen Louisa station
Tram 20	Hauptbahnhof; Niederrad; Stadion
Tram 21	Nied Kirche (peak times) / Gallus Mönchhofstraße; Mainzer Landstraße – Abzweig Kleyerstraße – Niederrad; Stadion
EE	Sightseeing circular Ebbelwei-Expreß

Low-floor trams are being used since April 2007 on all regular lines. The Alstom Citadis SX05 is the latest addition to the fleet.

The Ebbelwei express is a special line running on a loop from "Zoo" to "Messe/Schleife" via Altstadt and Sachsenhausen. The Ebbelwei-Express is a sightseeing line which runs only on weekends. Historic "K-type" trams are in operation on this route. Lieschen was a special line which ran from "Riedhof" to "Oberforsthaus" occasionally, only during a public festival called "Wäldchestag". Wäldchestag is only once a year during Pentecost, so the Frankfurt transit company VGF dismissed this line and its tracks in 2013.

The Stadtbahn line U5 is partly street running and uses the tracks of a former tram line. Originally the street running part on "Eckenheimer Landstraße" should be replaced by a subway, but due to a lack of funding as well as protests from the residents in this area who feared years of construction, those plans were cancelled. Therefore, instead, the VGF used former "P-type" trams on this line that could serve both, subway and tram lines. Since April 2016 the stations in the street running part on "Eckenheimer Landstraße" are being conversed in to high-level platforms to fit the new "U5-25/U5-50-type" subway cars.

== Ebbelwei-Expreß ==
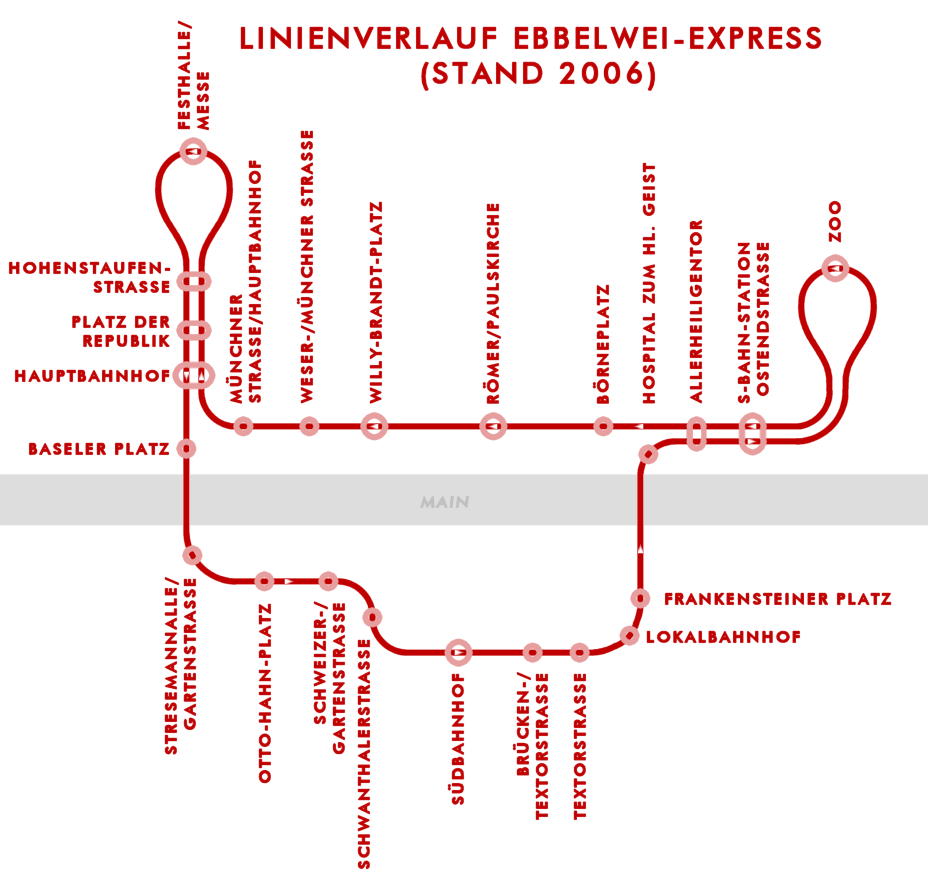
The Ebbelwei-Expreß line

This special line was started in 1977 on the occasion of the forthcoming decommission of the last two-truck trams and should have actually operated only for a short time. Owing to its enormous success, it remains in service to the present day.

== Fleet ==
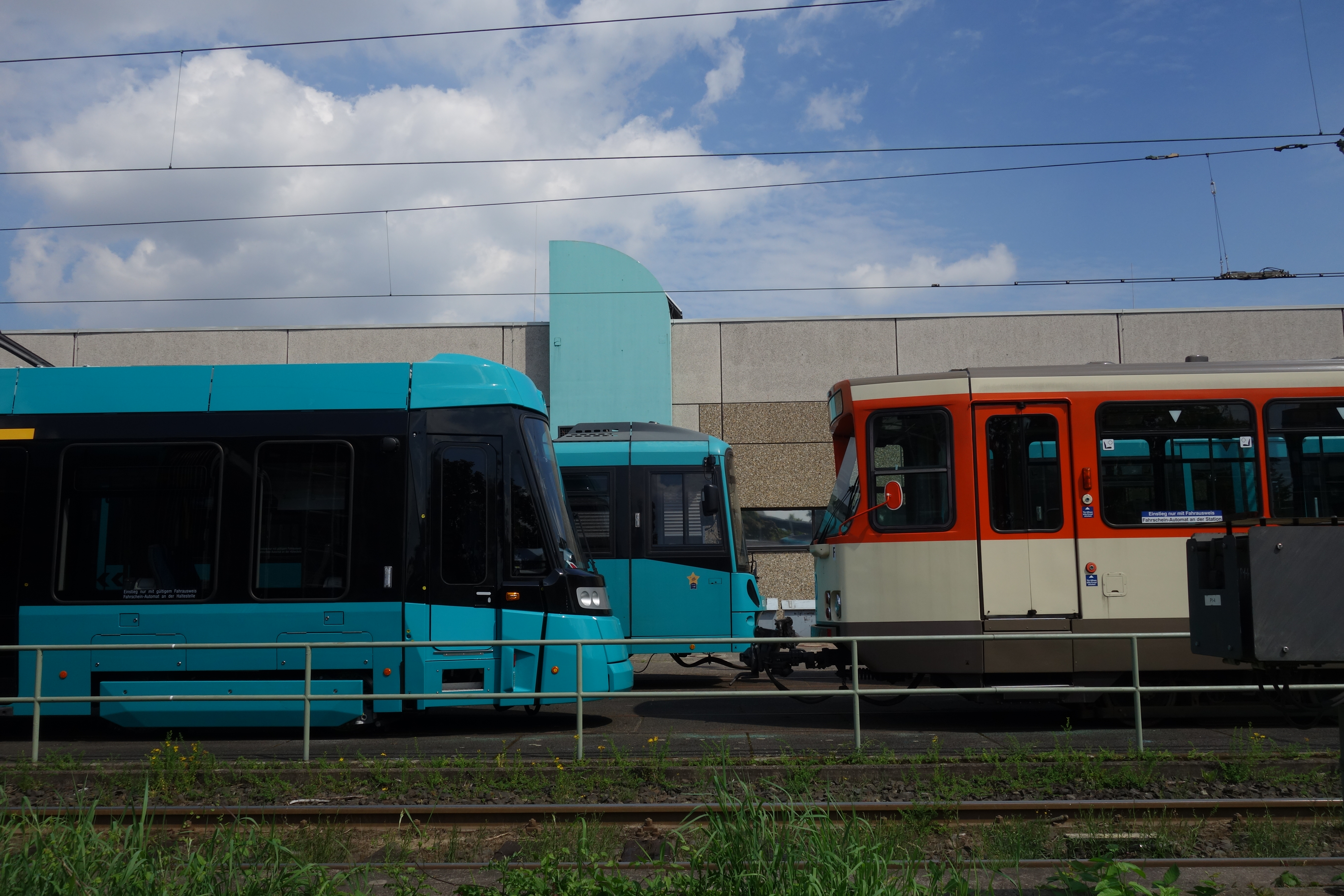
New and old: T- (left) and P-type (right) as well as U5 class (middle)

- "K-type": 1949 – 1977 (several cars; in use as "Ebbelwei-Express" and departmental vehicles)
- "L-type": 1955 – 1983 (two motor cars and two trailer cars remaining; one of each as historic streetcar)
- "M-type": 1957 – 1998 (one motor car and two trailers remaining as historic streetcar)
- "N-type": 1963 – 2004 (one remaining as historic streetcar)
- "O-type": 1969 – 2005 (two remaining; one of them as historic streetcar)
- "P-type": 1972 – 2016 (decommissioned, 3 cars will remain as historic streetcar)
- "R-type": 1993 – present (direct articulation design)
- "S-type": 2003 – present (suspended articulation design)
- "T-Type": 2022 – present (suspended articulation design)

== Frankfurt Transport Museum ==
The Frankfurt Transport Museum in Schwanheim shows the eventful history of Frankfurt's public transit. At least one of each type of streetcar (except types "E" and "G" and the ones that are still in operation) is preserved. In addition to that there is a small bus exhibition, showing two historic diesel buses and one trolleybus from Offenbach.

The "Historische Straßenbahn Frankfurt e.V." (Historic tramway organization) runs the museum on behalf of the Transport Company "VGF" and organizes shuttle services with old streetcars on special occasions.

== See also ==
- Frankfurt U-Bahn
- Rhine-Main S-Bahn
- Public transport in Frankfurt am Main
- Trams in Germany
