= Griesheim (Frankfurt am Main) =

- Quarter of Frankfurt am Main
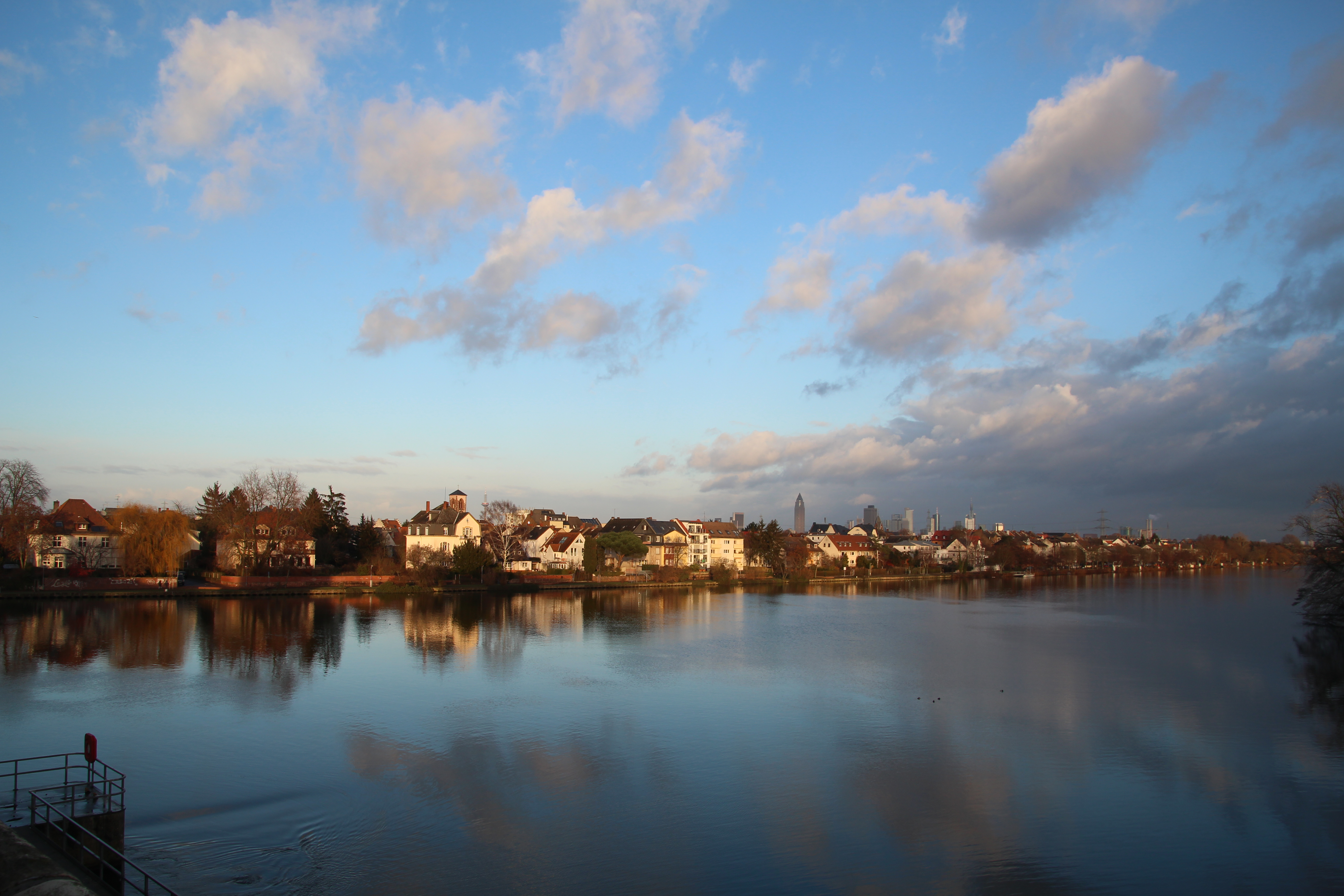

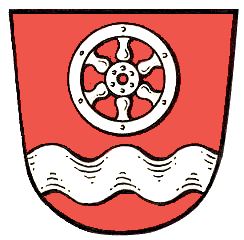
- Coat of arms

- Location of Griesheim (red) and the Ortsbezirk West (light red) within Frankfurt am Main
- Interactive map of Griesheim
- Location within Germany Location within Hesse
- Coordinates: 50°05′32″N 08°36′25″E
- Country: Germany
- State: Hesse
- Admin. region: Darmstadt
- District: Urban district
- City: Frankfurt am Main

Area
  - Total: 4.200 km^{2} (1.622 sq mi)

Population (2020-12-31)
  - Total: 23,569
  - Density: 5,612/km^{2} (14,530/sq mi)
- Time zone: UTC+01:00 (CET)
  - Summer (DST): UTC+02:00 (CEST)
- Postal codes: 65933
- Dialling codes: 069
- Vehicle registration: F
- Website: www.frankfurt.de

Griesheim (German pronunciation: [ˈɡʁiːsˌhaɪm]) is a quarter of Frankfurt am Main, Germany. It is part of the Ortsbezirk West.

Griesheim had been an independent town until 1928, the year of its incorporation. It is located between Nied, Sossenheim, Bockenheim, Gallus and Schwanheim.
