= Gallus (Frankfurt am Main) =

- Quarter of Frankfurt am Main
- Location of the Gallus (red) and the Ortsbezirk Innenstadt I (light red) within Frankfurt am Main
- Interactive map of Gallus
- Location within Germany Location within Hesse
- Coordinates: 50°06′13″N 08°38′44″E
- Country: Germany
- State: Hesse
- Admin. region: Darmstadt
- District: Urban district
- City: Frankfurt am Main

Area
  - Total: 4.301 km^{2} (1.661 sq mi)

Population (2020-12-31)
  - Total: 42,012
  - Density: 9,768/km^{2} (25,300/sq mi)
- Time zone: UTC+01:00 (CET)
  - Summer (DST): UTC+02:00 (CEST)
- Postal codes: 60326, 60487
- Dialling codes: 069
- Vehicle registration: F
- Website: www.frankfurt.de

Gallus (German pronunciation: [ˈɡalʊs]; known as the Gallusviertel until 2007) is a quarter of Frankfurt am Main, Germany. It is part of the Ortsbezirk Innenstadt I and the location of the Frankfurt train station.

The name Gallus originates from the German word "Galgen" (English: Gallows).

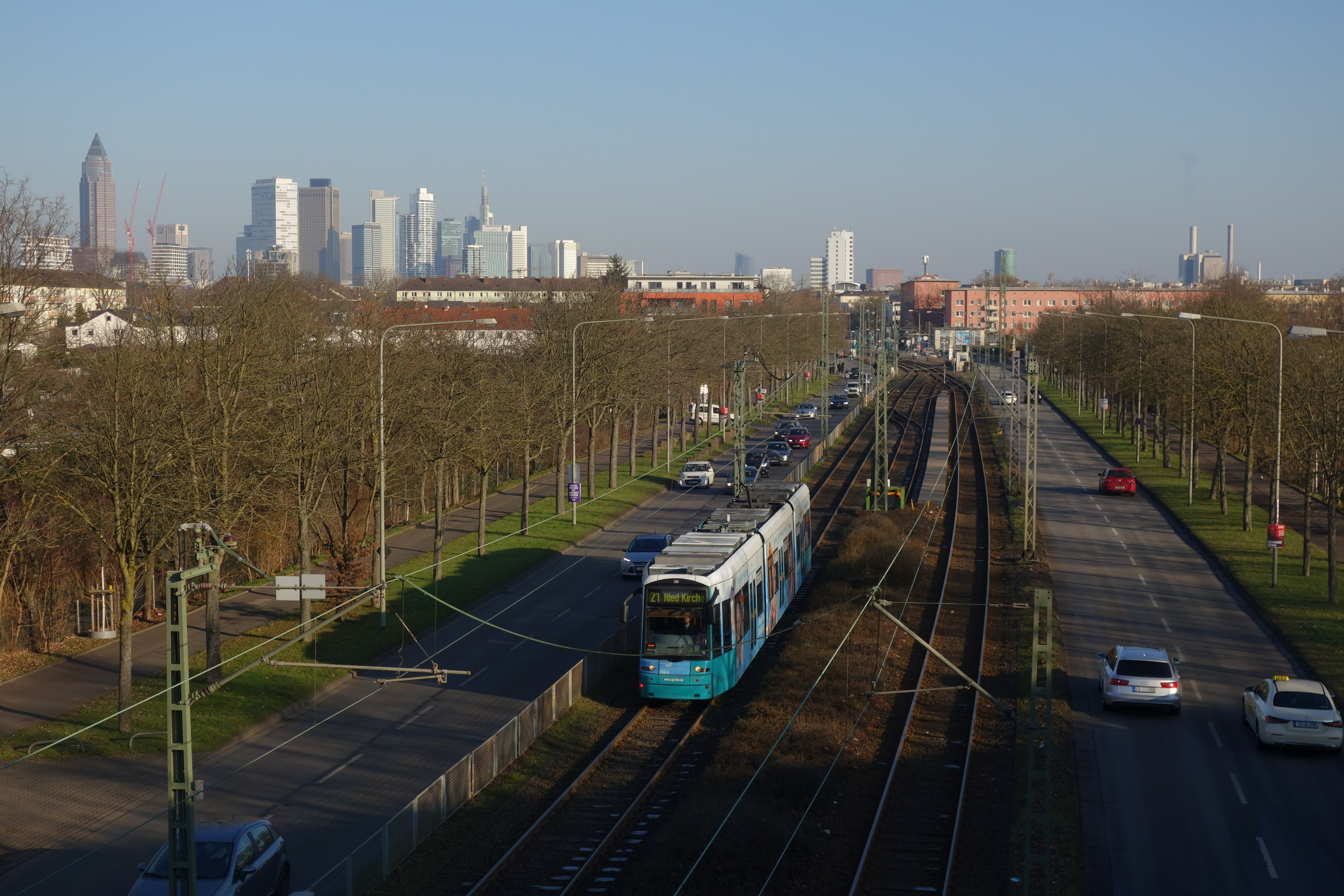
Mainzer Landstraße, view facing east from bridge of Autobahn A 5, which is the border to Frankfurt-Griesheim in the west (back of view); tramway line 21 heading for Frankfurt-Nied

Gallus extends in the west to Griesheim, while it is bordered in the north by the exhibition center and the Rebstockpark and in the south by the railway tracks. An important transport and business axis, Mainzer Landstraße, which is bordered by car dealers, gas stations and office buildings, cuts directly across the entire city section. On the grounds of the former freight depot and marshaling yard all around Den Haager Straße, a completely new residential and retail district is currently being developed, called the Europaviertel. During World War II, the Alderwerke factory was a concentration camp, using slave labour from the Natzweiler-Struthof concentration camp, and after the war the area was also host to the Frankfurt Auschwitz Trials during 1963–65. The Mövenpick Hotel Frankfurt City has been there since 2006 and further offices, stores and apartments were to be built on the 90 hectare site by 2019.
