= Nied (Frankfurt am Main) =

- Quarter of Frankfurt am Main
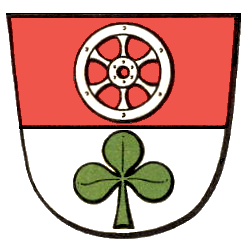
- Coat of arms

- Location of Nied (red) and the Ortsbezirk West (light red) within Frankfurt am Main
- Interactive map of Nied
- Location within Germany Location within Hesse
- Coordinates: 50°05′59″N 08°33′53″E
- Country: Germany
- State: Hesse
- Admin. region: Darmstadt
- District: Urban district
- City: Frankfurt am Main

Area
  - Total: 3.723 km^{2} (1.437 sq mi)

Population (2020-12-31)
  - Total: 19,785
  - Density: 5,314/km^{2} (13,760/sq mi)
- Time zone: UTC+01:00 (CET)
  - Summer (DST): UTC+02:00 (CEST)
- Postal codes: 65934
- Dialling codes: 069
- Vehicle registration: F
- Website: www.frankfurt.de

Nied (German pronunciation: [niːt]) is a quarter of Frankfurt am Main, Germany. It is part of the Ortsbezirk West and is subdivided into the Stadtbezirke Nied-Nord and Nied-Süd.
