= Frankfurt U-Bahn =

Stadtbahn system serving Frankfurt, Hessen, Germany

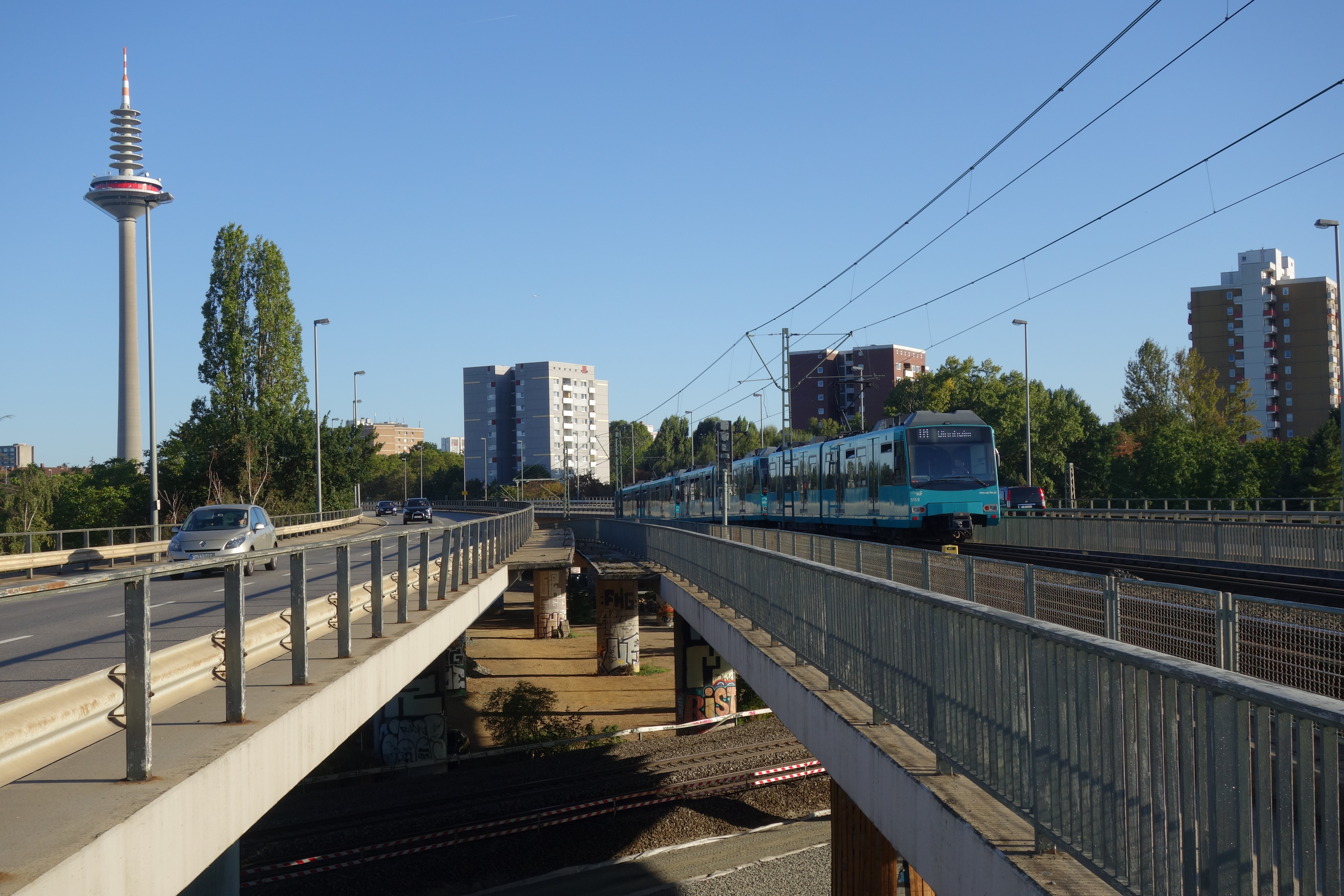
- Elevated route for motorway and subway at Rosa-Luxemburg-Straße, facing Ginnheim; Europaturm tower on the left

Overview
- Locale: Frankfurt, Hesse, Germany
- Transit type: Light rail (Stadtbahn), rapid transit
- Number of lines: 9
- Number of stations: 86
- Daily ridership: 360,000 (2023)
- Annual ridership: 123.6 million (2023)
- Website: VGF

Operation
- Began operation: 4 October 1968; 58 years ago
- Operator: Stadtwerke Verkehrsgesellschaft Frankfurt am Main (VGF)
- Character: Mostly underground, with significant sections at-grade (including at-grade intersections), with some street running (U5 line)
- Train length: 50–105 metres (164–344 ft)
- Headway: 2-15 minutes (daytime)

Technical
- System length: 64.85 km (40.3 mi)
- Track gauge: 1,435 mm (4 ft 8 1/2 in) standard gauge
- Electrification: 600 V DC from overhead catenary
- Top speed: 80 km/h (50 mph)
System map
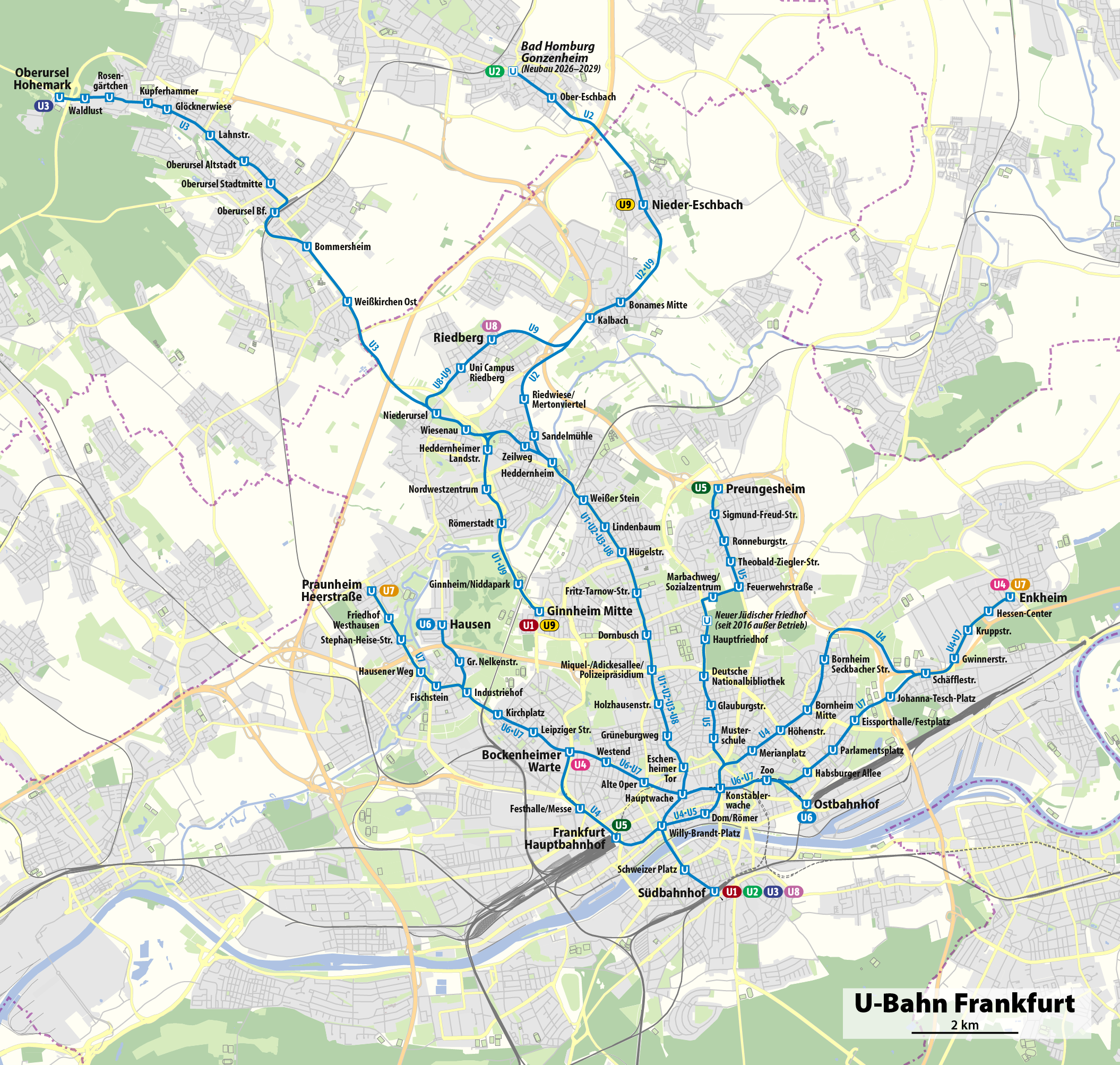
U-Bahnnetz Frankfurt

The Frankfurt U-Bahn is a Stadtbahn (premetro) system serving Frankfurt, Germany. Together with the Rhine-Main S-Bahn and the tram network, it forms the backbone of the public transport system in Frankfurt. Its name derives from the German term for underground railway, Untergrundbahn. Since 1996, the U-Bahn has been owned and operated by Stadtwerke Verkehrsgesellschaft Frankfurt am Main (VGF), the public transport company of Frankfurt, and is part of the Rhein-Main-Verkehrsverbund (RMV) transport association. The licence contract is up to 31 December 2031 and is renewable. The contracting authority of VGF is the municipal transport company traffiQ.

The U-Bahn opened in 1968, and has been expanded several times. It consists of three inner-city tunnels and above-ground lines in the suburbs. About 59% of the track length is underground. The network operates on a variety of right of ways typical of a light rail system, with core sections running underground in the inner city and some above-ground sections operating on street.

Like all public transport lines in Frankfurt, the system has been integrated in the Rhein-Main Verkehrsverbund (RMV) since 1995. From 1974 until the founding of the RMV, the Stadtwerke were shareholders in the predecessor group, the Frankfurter Verkehrsverbund (FVV; Frankfurt Transport Association).

The network consists of 84 stations on nine lines, with a total length of 64.85 kilometres (40.30 mi). Eight of the nine lines travel through the city center (line U9 being the exception). In 2023, the U-Bahn carried 123.6 million passengers, an average of approximately 338,600 passengers per day. The most recent expansion of the network was on 12 December 2010 when two new lines were added, the U8 and the U9 (both part of the long-planned but only partially completed fourth route), which opened up the university campus area and the new development area at Riedberg.

== History ==
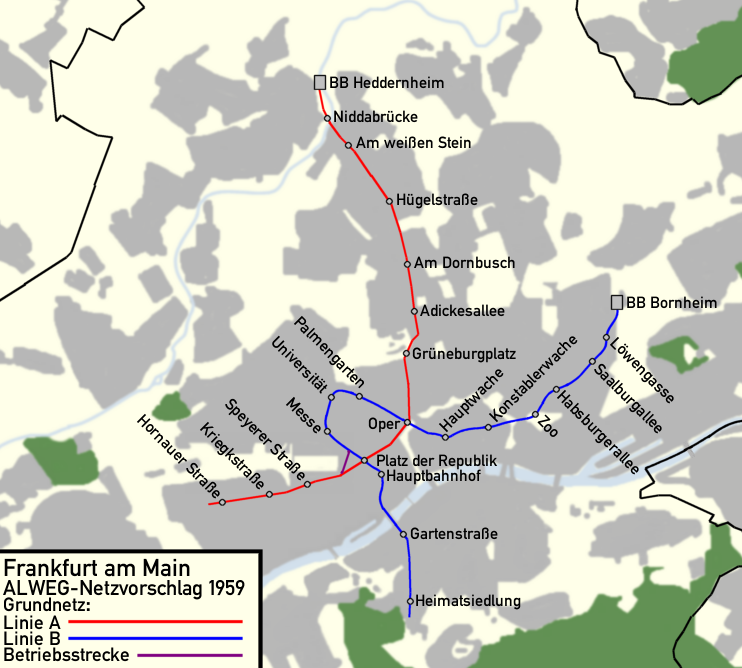
Diagram of the never-realised Frankfurt monorail system.

At the beginning of the 1950s, the first plans were made to relieve the then already overburdened tram. More than 100,000 motor vehicles were registered in Frankfurt in 1958, and more than 180,000 commuters used the transport infrastructure on a daily basis. Various alternatives to the construction of a modern high-speed traffic system and the separation of above-ground traffic flows were discussed. On 5 April 1960, the SPD faction requested that the city council might commit to a two-line straddle-beam monorail system designed by Alweg. Lord Mayor Werner Bockelmann, however, advocated from the outset the construction of a U-Bahn, which was however considered the most expensive option. On 7 July 1960, the city council therefore commissioned a city planner with the preparation of a general planning overview in order to compare the costs of the three systems: Alweg straddle-beam monorail, U-Bahn and Stadtbahn (premetro). Responsible for the planning was in October 1961 designated to the head of the Traffic Department Walter Möller. The decision was finally made in late 1961 in favour of a U-Bahn system, which was to be built in several sections initially using existing tram infrastructure. In the first construction phase, the tunnels of the inner city were to be built for the time being, which were to be connected via provisional ramps to the adjacent tram routes. It was not until the second construction phase that the tunnels were to be extended beyond the inner city and connected to suitable upgraded above-ground routes in the suburbs. In the third construction phase, the change from Stadtbahn to U-Bahn would have been completed, which was to operate completely independently of traffic in tunnels, cuts and dams.

On 28 June 1963 the first pile of rubble for the construction of the 3.2-kilometre (2.0 mi)-long tunnel under the Eschersheimer Landstraße. For the first stage of development until 1975 - approximately corresponding to today's main lines A and B - construction costs of 565 million DM were expected. The new Lord Mayor Willi Brundert compared the "boldly begun subway construction" in 1964 in its dimensions with the medieval cathedral building.

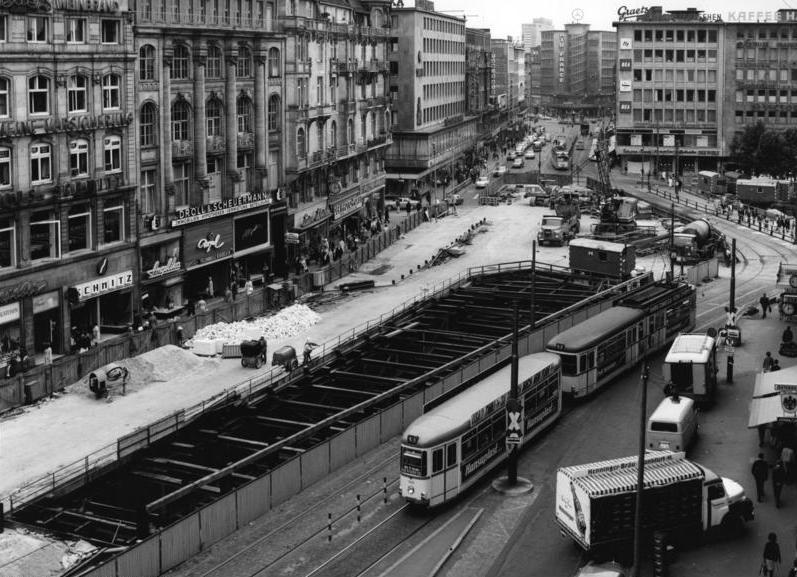
1966 near Hauptwache: Construction in progress under the street Roßmarkt up to Kaiserstraße.

After just one year, the ambitious mammoth project threatened to fail due to financing problems. Falling tax revenues and a tax policy geared towards federal and state governments drove the municipalities close to ruin in the mid-1960s. Frankfurt was 1.4 billion DM in debt in 1964, the most heavily indebted city in Germany, with a regular budget of 733 million DM. Under pressure to stabilize the budget deficit, the 1964–65 municipal assembly reduced long-term investment planning from 2.7 billion DM to 1.7 billion DM and even hinted that for some time that Eschersheimer Landstraße would be "impassable desert" after completion of the tunnelling work.

The U-Bahn opened on 4 October 1968, with the first route running from Hauptwache to Nordweststadt (now line U1). This first section ended up costing 344 million DM to construct, of which the federal government contributed 56 million DM and the state of Hesse contributed 129 million DM.

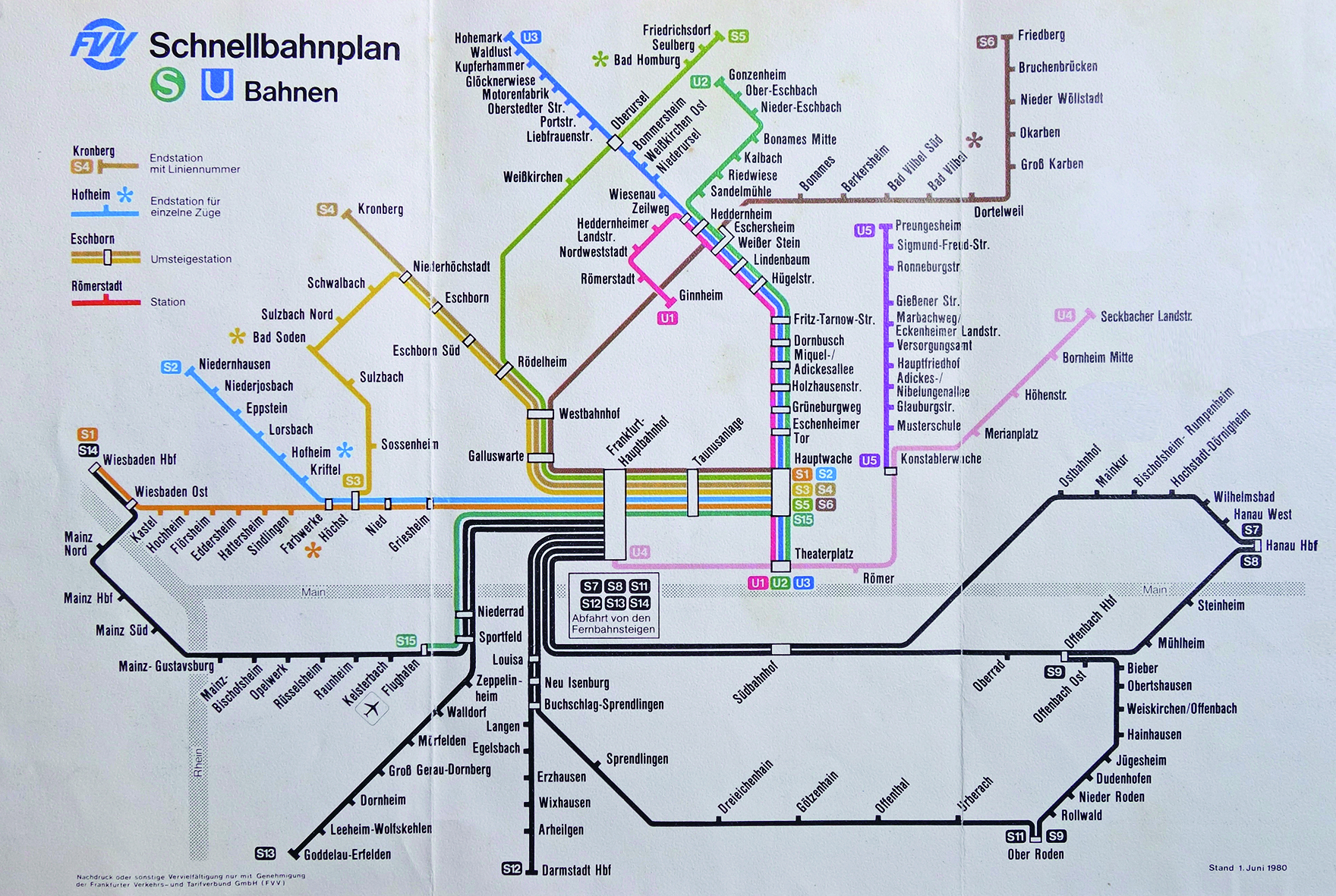
U-Bahn- and S-Bahn-lines in 1980 (still without Line C)

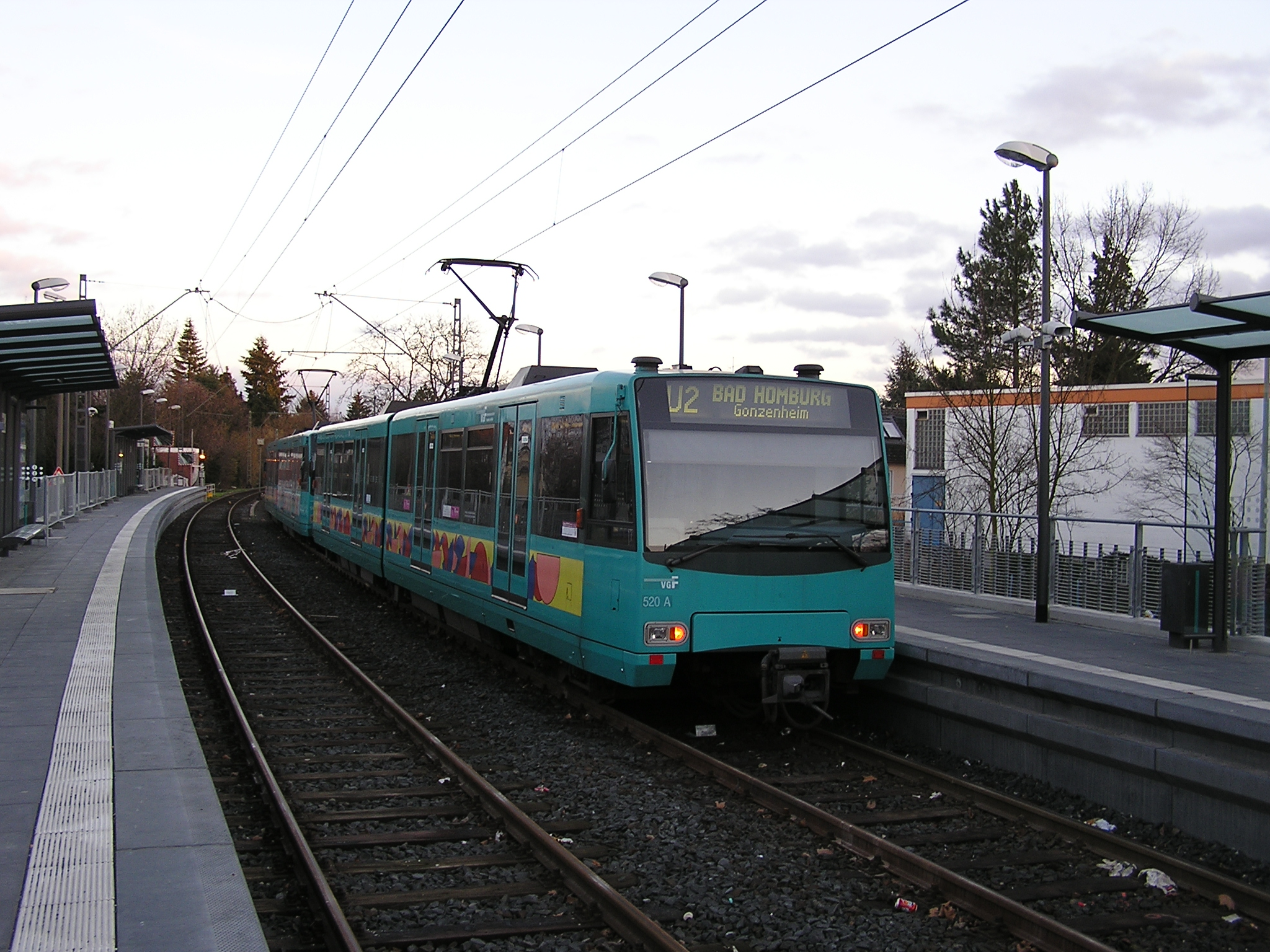
Train of U4 class cars at Bad Homburg Gonzenheim station

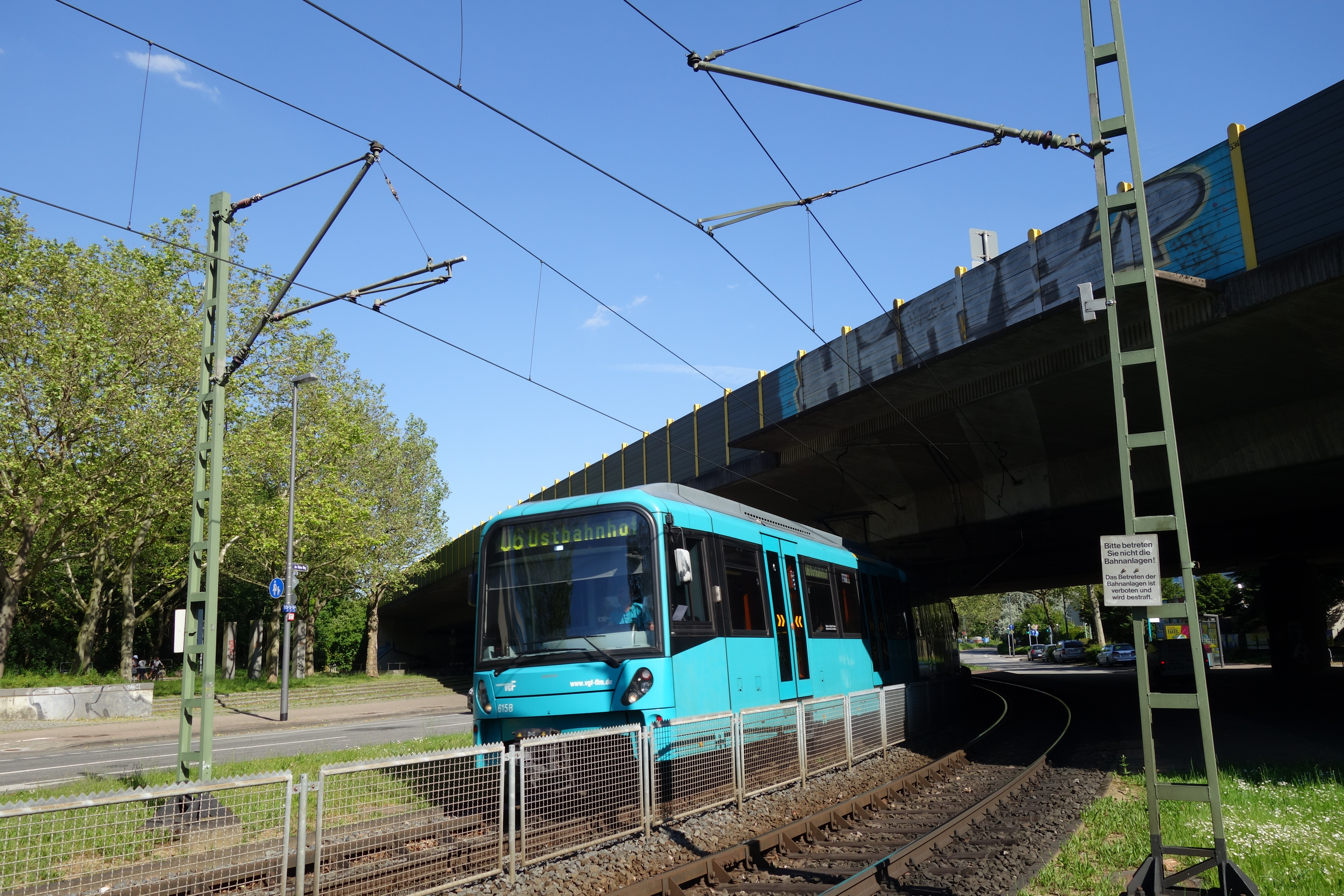
U5 class car as line U6 underneath Bundesautobahn 66 close to final station Hausen.

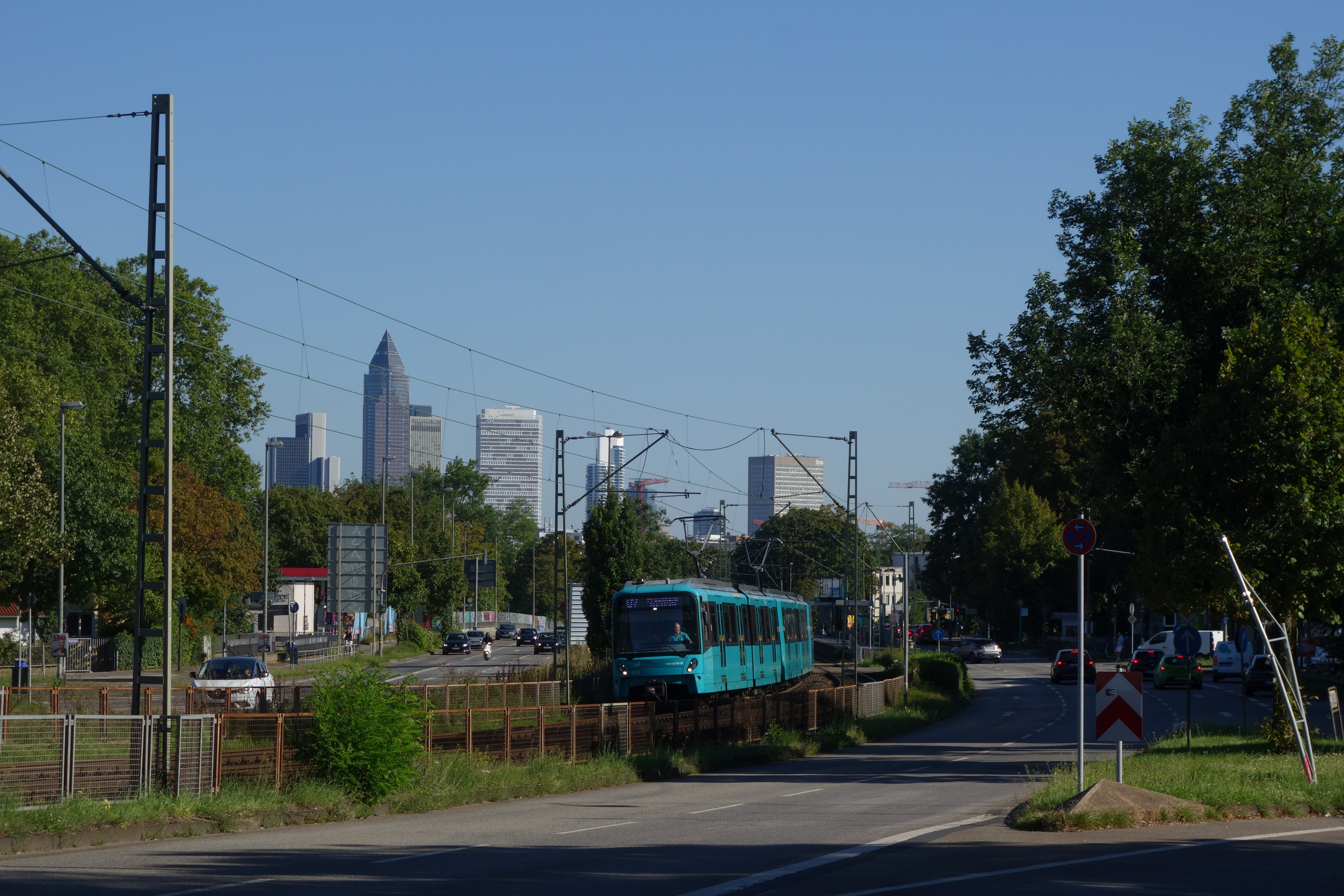
U7 amidst Ludwig-Landmann-Straße in Rödelheim

== Current lines ==
The route network consists of the four routes "A", "B", "C" and "D" used by a total of nine different services, U1 to U9. The total operating length of is 64.85 kilometres (40.30 mi). The first three routes ("A", "B" and "C") each have a separate tunnelled section under the city centre. The fourth, D, route is still only partially completed. Central sections of the routes, shared by multiple services, are called "basic route" or "trunk route"; these branch out into several "connecting lines", which are usually used by only one service and are sometimes referred to as "upgraded lines". The terms "basic section" and "connecting section" and their designations are based on the names of the construction sections. Sections of the legs were designated by the letter of the route and a Roman numerical suffix - sections of the connecting lines with an Arabic numeral. The designation of the connecting lines "A1", "A2", "A3" and "B1" was also used to designate the lines until 1978.

Like all light rail vehicles, trams and subways in Germany, the Frankfurt U-Bahn is subject to the BOStrab tram regulations. The tunnels and the above-ground section between Römerstadt and Ginnheim are completely separate from other traffic. Most of the other above-ground sections run on reserved track but have numerous level crossings for road traffic and pedestrians. The section of the U5 between Friedberger Anlage and Marbachweg operates in the largely on street.

Tunnels exist at -

- A Line: South of Dornbusch, into the city centre, Nordwestzentrum (small section)
- B Line: Scheffeleck and Seckbacher Landstraße to Bockenheimer Warte.
- C Line: Kirchplatz to Johanna-Tesch-Platz and Ostbahnhof

Route	Line	Path	Stations
A (and D)	U1	Ginnheim - Römerstadt - Nordwestzentrum - Hauptwache - Willy-Brandt-Platz - Südbahnhof	20
A	U2	Bad Homburg-Gonzenheim - Ober-Eschbach - Nieder-Eschbach - Bonames - Hauptwache - Willy-Brandt-Platz - Südbahnhof	21
A	U3	Oberursel-Hohemark - Oberursel - Niederursel - Hauptwache - Willy-Brandt-Platz - Südbahnhof	28
B (and C+D)	U4	Enkheim - Schäfflestraße - Seckbacher Landstraße - Bornheim - Konstablerwache - Willy-Brandt-Platz - Hauptbahnhof - Festhalle/Messe - Bockenheimer Warte	15
B	U5	Preungesheim - Eckenheim - Hauptfriedhof - Konstablerwache - Willy-Brandt-Platz - Hauptbahnhof	16
C	U6	Hausen - Bockenheimer Warte - Hauptwache - Konstablerwache - Ostbahnhof	12
C	U7	Heerstraße - Bockenheimer Warte - Hauptwache - Konstablerwache - Eissporthalle - Hessen-Center - Enkheim	20
A (and D)	U8	Riedberg - Niederursel - Hauptwache - Willy-Brandt-Platz - Südbahnhof	19
D (and A)	U9	Nieder-Eschbach - Riedberg - Niederursel - Nordwestzentrum - Römerstadt - Ginnheim	12

=== Routings ===
These are individual routings.

Stretch	Line	Routing	Opening	Stations	Frequency
A1	U1	Ginnheim ↔ Heddernheim; Hochbahn: Ginnheim – Römerstadt – Tunnel: Nordwestzentrum – Heddernh. Landstr. – Eisenbahn: Zeilweg – Heddernheim	1968–1978	6	7½	10	15
A2	U2	Bad Homburg-Gonzenheim ↔ Heddernheim; Eisenbahn: Gonzenheim – Ndr.-Eschb. – Bonames – Mertonviertel – Heddernheim	1971	7	7½	10	15
A3	U3	Oberursel-Hohemark ↔ Heddernheim; Eisenbahn: Hohemark – Oberursel – Weißkirchen – Niederursel – Heddernheim	1978	14	7½	15	15
B1	U5	Preungesheim ↔ Konstablerwache; Stadtbahn: Preungesheim – Gießener Straße – Eckenheim – Marbachweg – Straßenbahn: Hauptfriedhof – Eckenh. Landstr. – Nordend – Tunnel: Scheffeleck – Konstablerwache	1974–1978	12	5	7½	10–20
B2	U4	Bornheim Seckbacher Landstr. ↔ Konstablerwache; Tunnel: Bornheim – Berger Straße – Nordend – Konstablerwache; Stadtbahn: Bornheim Seckbacher Landstr. – Schäfflestraße – (Enkheim mit U7)	1980	4	5	7½	10–20
C1 (Note: The connecting line C1 between the stations Schäfflestraße and Enkheim is additionally driven by individual trains of the line U4. The data in the table refers only to line U7.)	U4 U7	Zoo ↔ Enkheim; Tunnel: Zoo – Ostend – Eissporthalle (U7 only) – Stadtbahn: Riederwald – Borsigallee – Enkheim (U4 und U7)	1992	9	7½	10	20
C4 (Note: The construction section C IV is actually a part of the basic section C. Since the section corresponds operatively to a connecting section, it is listed in this table.)	U6	Zoo ↔ Ostbahnhof; Tunnel: Zoo – Ostbahnhof	1999	1	7½	10	20
Hausen	U7	Hausen ↔ Industriehof; Stadtbahn: Hausen – Industriehof	1986	2	7½	10	20
Heerstr.	U6	Praunheim Heerstraße ↔ Industriehof; Stadtbahn: Praunheim – Ludwig-Landmann-Str. – Hausen – Industriehof	1986	5	7½	10	20
D4 (formerly known as A2)	U8 U9	Niederursel ↔ Abzweig Kalbach; Stadtbahn: – Niederursel – Riedberg – Bonames → Nieder-Eschbach	2010	4	15	15	30

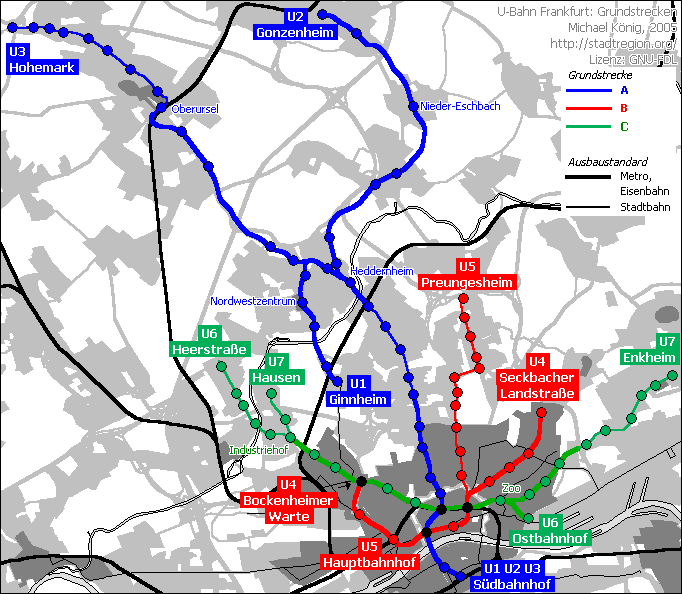
Frankfurt U-Bahn network map in 2005, showing Sections A, B, C.

== Future plans ==
As of 2024 extensions of the system in planning or under construction include:

- U5 Extension to the Europaviertel
- Closure of the Ginnheim–Bockenheimer Warte gap (currently served only by the ground-level tram system)

== Depots ==
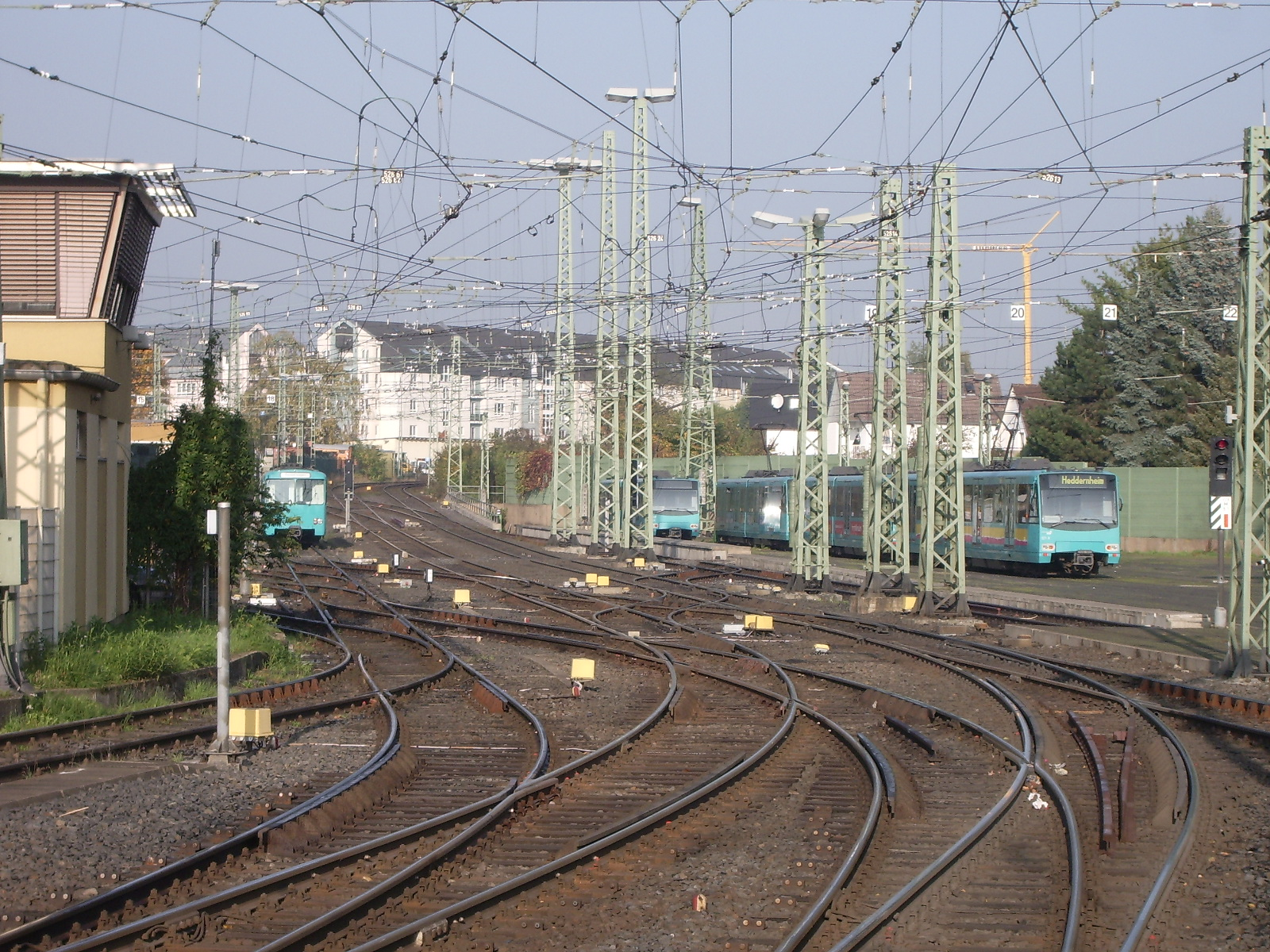
Tracks at Heddernheim Depot

There are two depots for U-Bahn trains:

- Heddernheim Depot (German: Betriebshof Heddernheim) is located to the north of Heddernheim station, next to the A Line, and is used by trains from services on the A Line and the northern section of the D Line (U1, U2, U3, U8 and U9). It opened in 1910 as a tram depot and became the first U-Bahn depot in 1968 when the network opened.
- The East Depot (German: Betriebshof Ost) in Riederwald opened in 2003, and since then has been the home for trains on the B and C Lines (U4-U7) as well as some trams. It is located on the connecting track from the B Line station at Seckbacher Landstraße to the C Line between Johanna-Tesch-Platz and Schäfflestraße.

== Rolling stock ==
=== U6/U1 Class ===
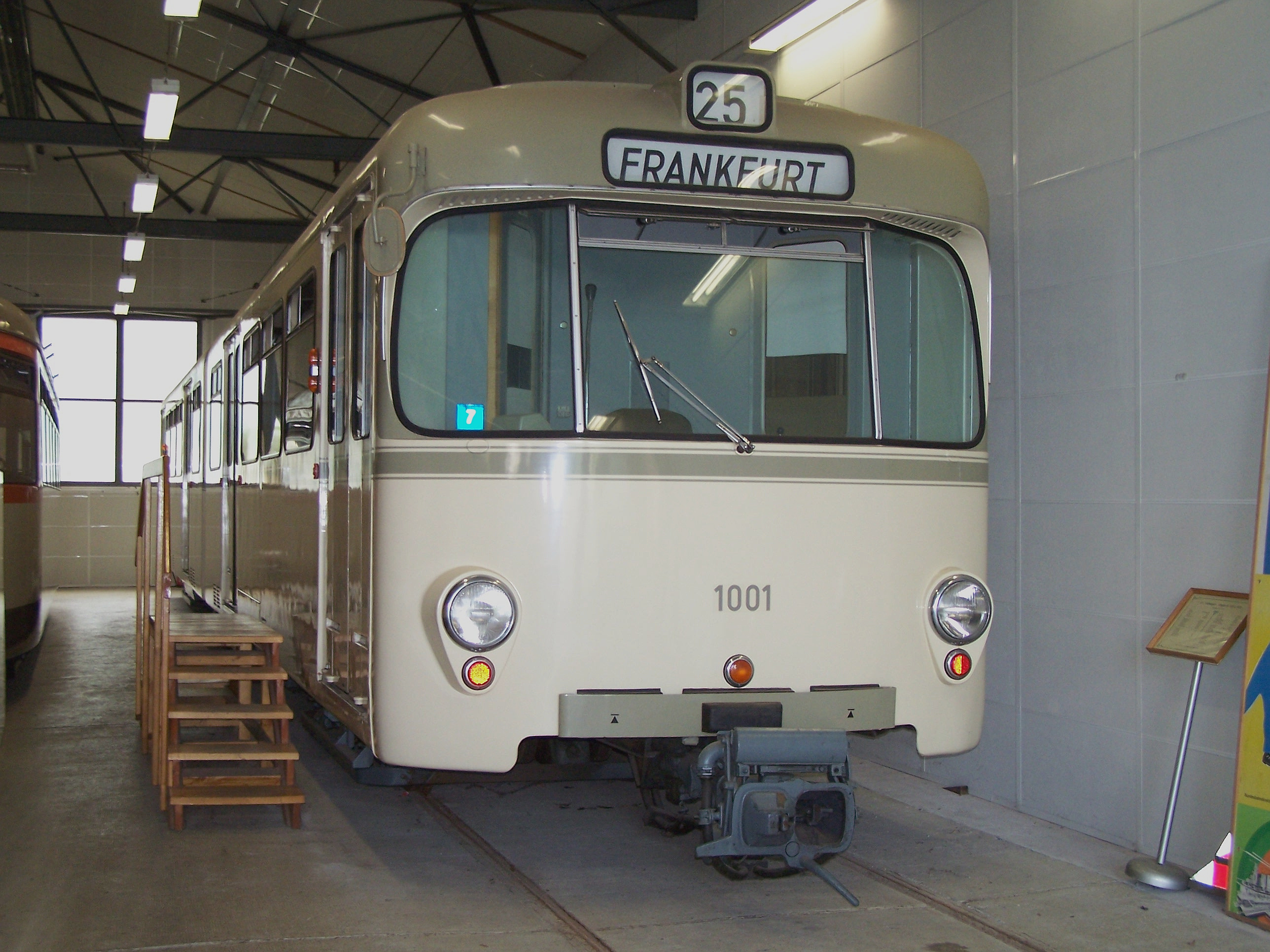
Prototype U1 vehicle 1001 in the Frankfurt Transport Museum

The U1 Class consists of two six-axle, two-section prototype vehicles built by Duewag in 1965, derived from the manufacturer's previous tramcars. The original designation was U6 (U-Bahn vehicle with 6 axles), but this was changed to U1 when the U2 Class were delivered. The first prototype was delivered in cream livery but both were painted red and white from 1968. The U1 Class were removed from service in 1976 because they were incompatible with newer vehicle types. One non-operational U1 Class is now in the collection of the Frankfurt Transport Museum.

=== P/Pt/Ptb Tram/LRV Hybrid ===
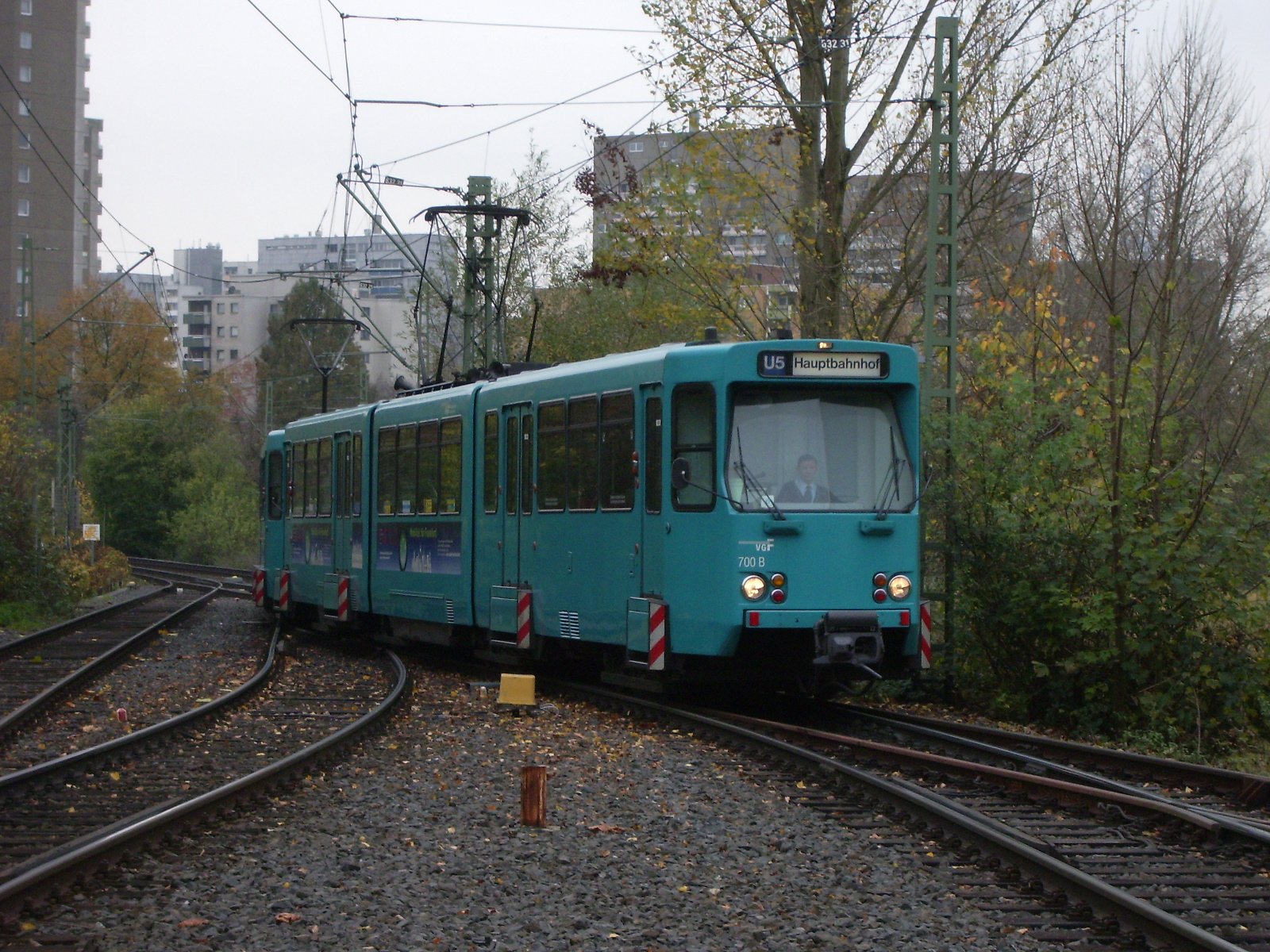
Ptb car 700 on line U5

A total of 100 P/Pt/Ptb Class vehicles were built by Duewag in three batches from 1972-1978 and used until 2016 on the U-Bahn network. While the first batch of 30 vehicles were fitted with folding steps, to facilitate access from street level in tram service or high platforms at U-Bahn stations, the second and third batches had fixed steps and thus was initially incompatible with the platforms on the U-Bahn lines. To differentiate the two subclasses, the batch with folding steps was designated Pt (t for tunnelgängig, operable in tunnels). Between 1984 and 1986 the third batch was rebuilt with folding steps in order to be operated on the C Line, and the second batch were also rebuilt as Pt Class in 1992 when the U7 was extended to Enkheim.

In order to accommodate the narrower body of the Pt, the U-Bahn platforms had to be modified and in order to allow mixed operation at the same platforms as the other light rail vehicles, which were 30 cm wider, some Pt vehicles were widened around the door area. The resulting subclass was then named Ptb (b for breit, wide). The aforementioned modifications to the platforms were reversed as well. Even after no other lines required the folding steps, the Ptb remained indispensable on the U5 service where on certain sections the stations did not have high platforms until 2016. Some Ptb class cars had their widened steps restored to regular width and were repurposed for a time on tram lines 15, 17 and 20 due to a tram stock shortage.

=== U2 Class ===
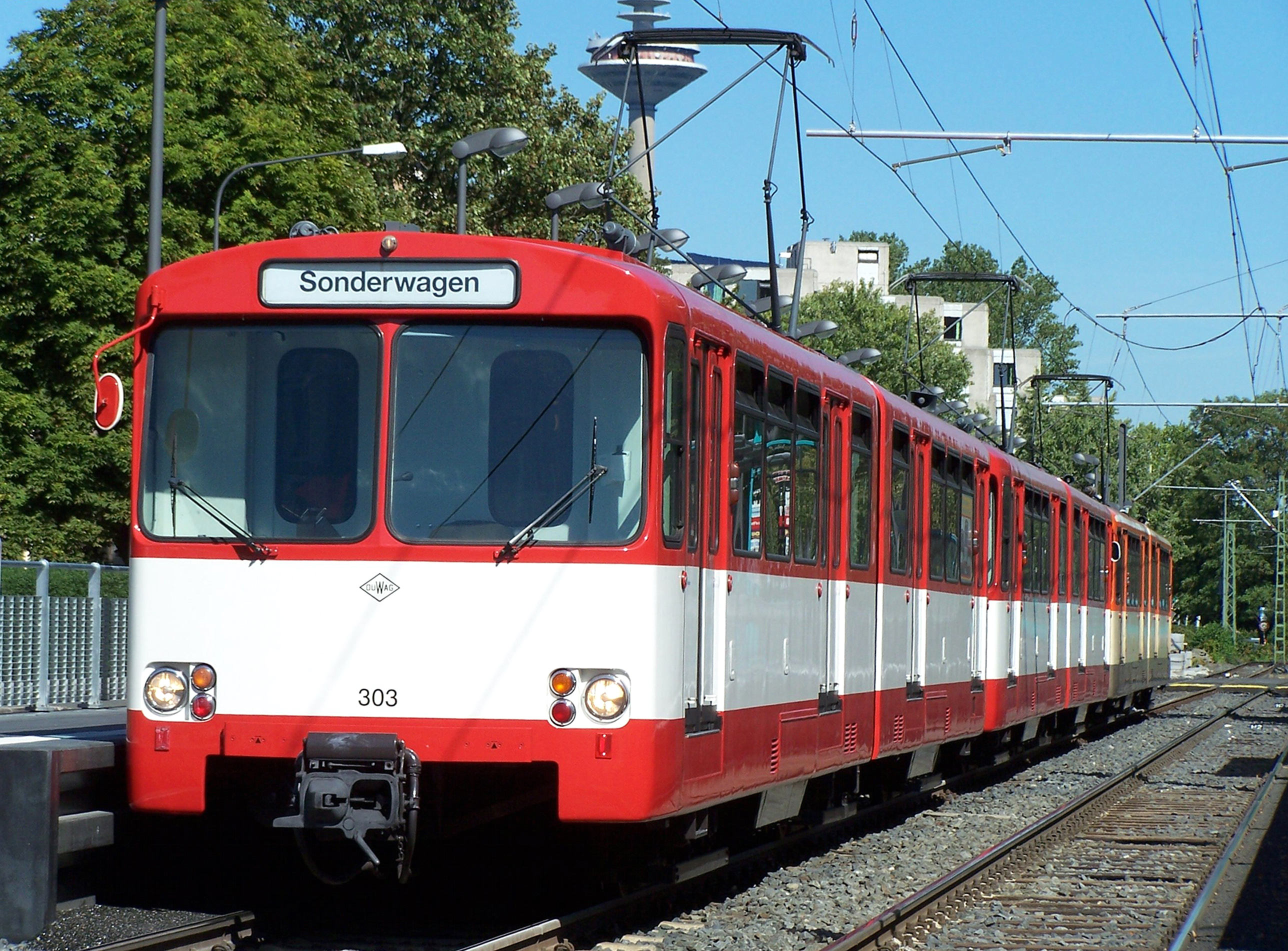
U2 car 303 in original livery

The U2 Class were the first production vehicles for the network. Duewag built 104 vehicles of this type in seven batches from 1968 to 1984. The final (seventh) batch of seven units was delivered after a fire at Heddernheim Depot in 1980 destroyed five sets. They were originally painted in a red and white livery, before being repainted in beige, ivory and grey from 1981 and finally from 1996 turquoise (officially known as subaru vista blue). Unlike the prototype vehicles the U2 Class did not have folding steps. Instead there were fixed steps inside the doors, level with the underground station platforms but a step up from the lower platforms at above-ground stations.

The U2 cars were all used on the A Line until 1998 when 32 vehicles were transferred to the C Line. This had slightly higher platforms (87 cm) and these vehicles were rebuilt as U2e with the steps in the door areas removed. The vehicles remaining on the A Line were also rebuilt from 1999, with the steps raised but not removed, becoming U2h.

The last U2 car was withdrawn after a farewell trip on 3 April 2016. Three examples have been preserved.

Siemens adapted the U2 design for the North American light rail market and similar vehicles were supplied to Edmonton, Calgary and San Diego.

=== U3 Class ===
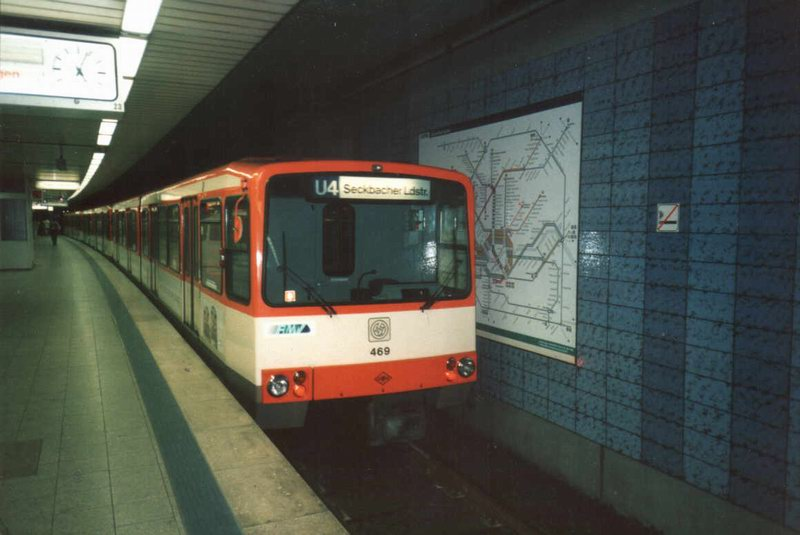
U3 car 469 in original livery

The U3 Class was based on the U2, but slightly longer (24.49 m), with a body made entirely of steel, and without any steps for access from low platforms. Duewag built 27 vehicles in 1979 and 1980, which were originally deployed on the U4 and transferred to the U6 in 2015.

In 2017 the last type U3 train was retired from service. After their withdrawal in Frankfurt 24 trains were refurbished and transferred to Monterrey Metro in Mexico. The other three have remained in Frankfurt as museum vehicles.

=== U4 Class ===
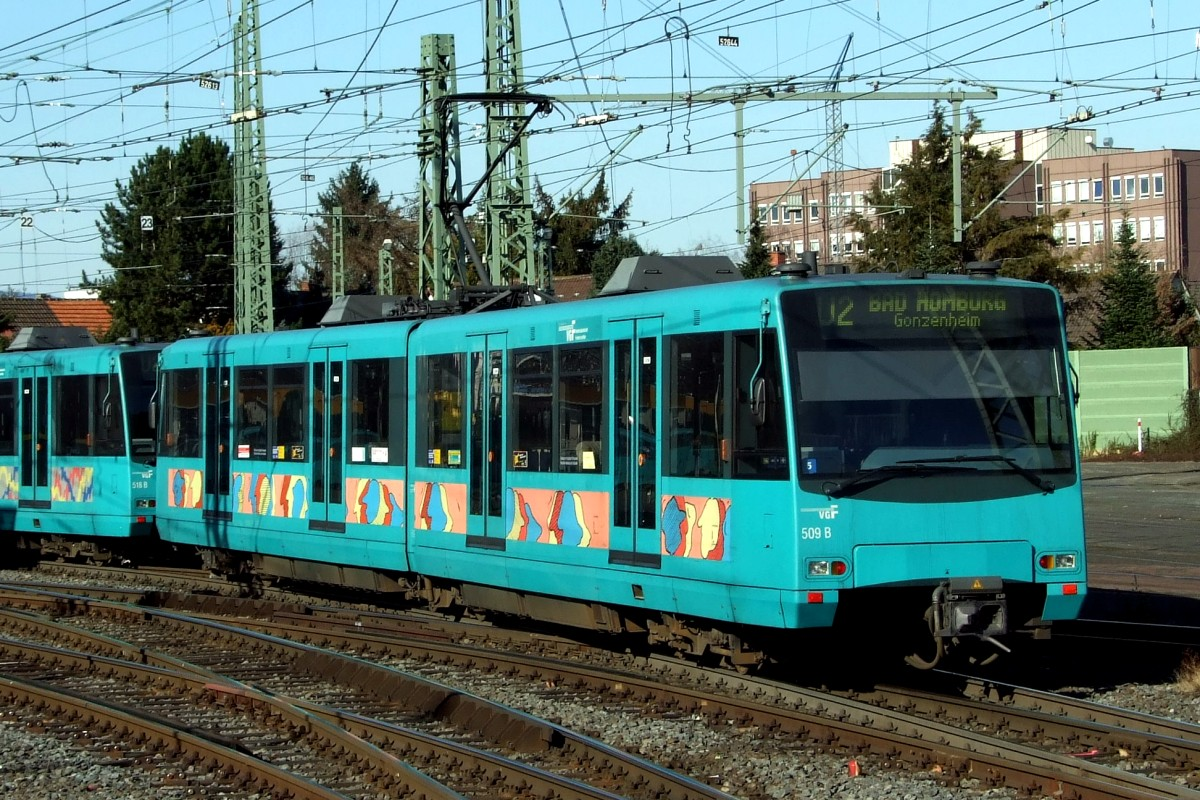
U4 car 509

The U4 class is developed from the U3 class, but with an appearance similar to the R type trams. Siemens-Duewag built 39 vehicles between 1994 and 1998, numbered 501–539. They were the first U-Bahn vehicles delivered in the current subaru vista blue livery. Originally the U4 vehicles were deployed on A Line services U1, U2 and U3, and later also on lines U8 and U9. An accident involving the two cars 517 and 532 on 28 February 2007 resulted in their early retirement from the fleet and being scrapped for spare parts. Between 2010 and 2017 all remaining U4 cars were refurbished. They were fitted with new yellow handrails and orange entrance areas to help visually impaired passengers orientate themselves in the train, and an air conditioning system for the driver's cab. The trains were also modified so they could run in multiple with the newer U5 Class.

=== U5 Class ===
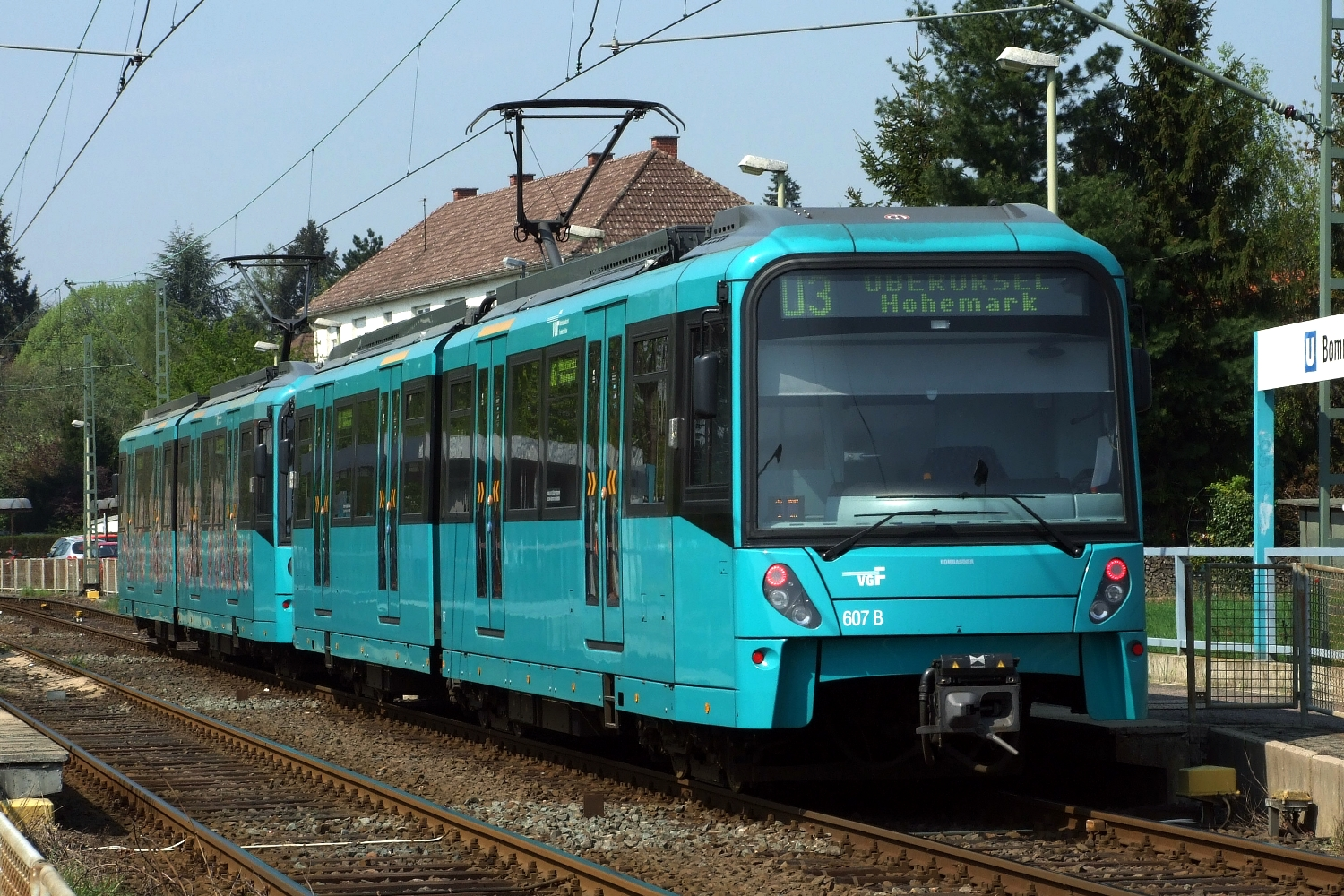
U5-ZR car 607

The U5 Class, the newest of the U-Bahn fleet, has been produced by Bombardier Transportation (now Alstom) in Bautzen, and is part of the manufacturer's Flexity Swift range. The first order of 146 vehicles was placed in 2006, another order for 78 vehicles came in 2011. and 22 further vehicles were ordered in 2018, with a 23rd vehicle to be delivered to compensate for delivery delays. The first vehicles were delivered in 2008, for use on the A Line and U5 vehicles are now deployed on all lines.

The design of the U5 class is similar to the older trains. They are 25 m long, two-section, six-axle vehicles, but there are three subtypes. The U5-ZR (Zweirichtungswagen, bi-directional vehicle) have driving cabs at each end. The U5-ER (Einrichtungswagen, uni-directional vehicle) have a driving cab at one end and an open gangway at the other. Two of these can be connected to form a 50 m long train, called U5-50, in a concept similar to the TW2500 on the Hanover Stadtbahn. The third type are designated U5-MW, (Mittelwagen, intermediate vehicle). They have no cab and both ends of the unit are outfitted with gangways. One or two of these can be coupled between two U5-ER sets to form a continually walk-through train of either 75 metres (U5-75) or 100 metres (U5-100). Each cabless end is also equipped with a dashboard in order to facilitate shunting, as well as sliding doors (for closing up the train during shunting movements), and head/tail lights.

== See also ==
- Rhine-Main S-Bahn
- Trams in Frankfurt am Main
- Public transport in Frankfurt am Main
- List of rapid transit systems
- Rail transport in Germany
