= Walter Möller =

German politician of the SPD (1920–1971)

Mayor of Frankfurt
- In office 11 June 1970 – 16 November 1971
- Preceded by: Willi Brundert
- Succeeded by: Rudi Arndt

Personal details
- Born: 7 April 1920 Bornheim, Frankfurt, Germany
- Died: 16 November 1971 (aged 51) Wiesbaden, West Germany
- Party: Social Democratic Party of Germany (SPD)

Walter Möller (7 April 1920 – 16 November 1971) was a German politician who served as the Mayor of Frankfurt from 1970 until his death in 1971.

== Life ==
Möller was born to Karl and Maria Möller (née Ploennigs), a working-class couple living in the Bornheim area of Frankfurt. His father was a blacksmith who was active in SPD politics. After the rise of the Nazi Party to power in Germany, Möller began training to become a book printer, but left to join the Luftwaffe in 1937. After the end of the war, Möller studied at the Academy of Labour in Frankfurt, graduating in February 1948. He then worked for Radio Frankfurt, before joining the Frankfurt City Council as a member of the SPD. From 1949 he was the editor of the party magazine for the Hessen SPD. In 1961, Möller was made the Department Head for Transport under then-mayor Werner Bockelmann. He undersaw the planning, construction and operation of the Frankfurt U-Bahn. Möller drove the first train to pass through the U-Bahn when it opened on 4 October 1968. On 11 June 1970, Möller was elected Mayor of Frankfurt following the death of his predecessor, Willi Brundert. However, shortly after his election, Möller began suffering from deteriorating health, experiencing a heart attack in May 1971. Möller died after a second heart attack in Wiesbaden on 16 November 1971. He only served one year of his four-year term as mayor before his death.

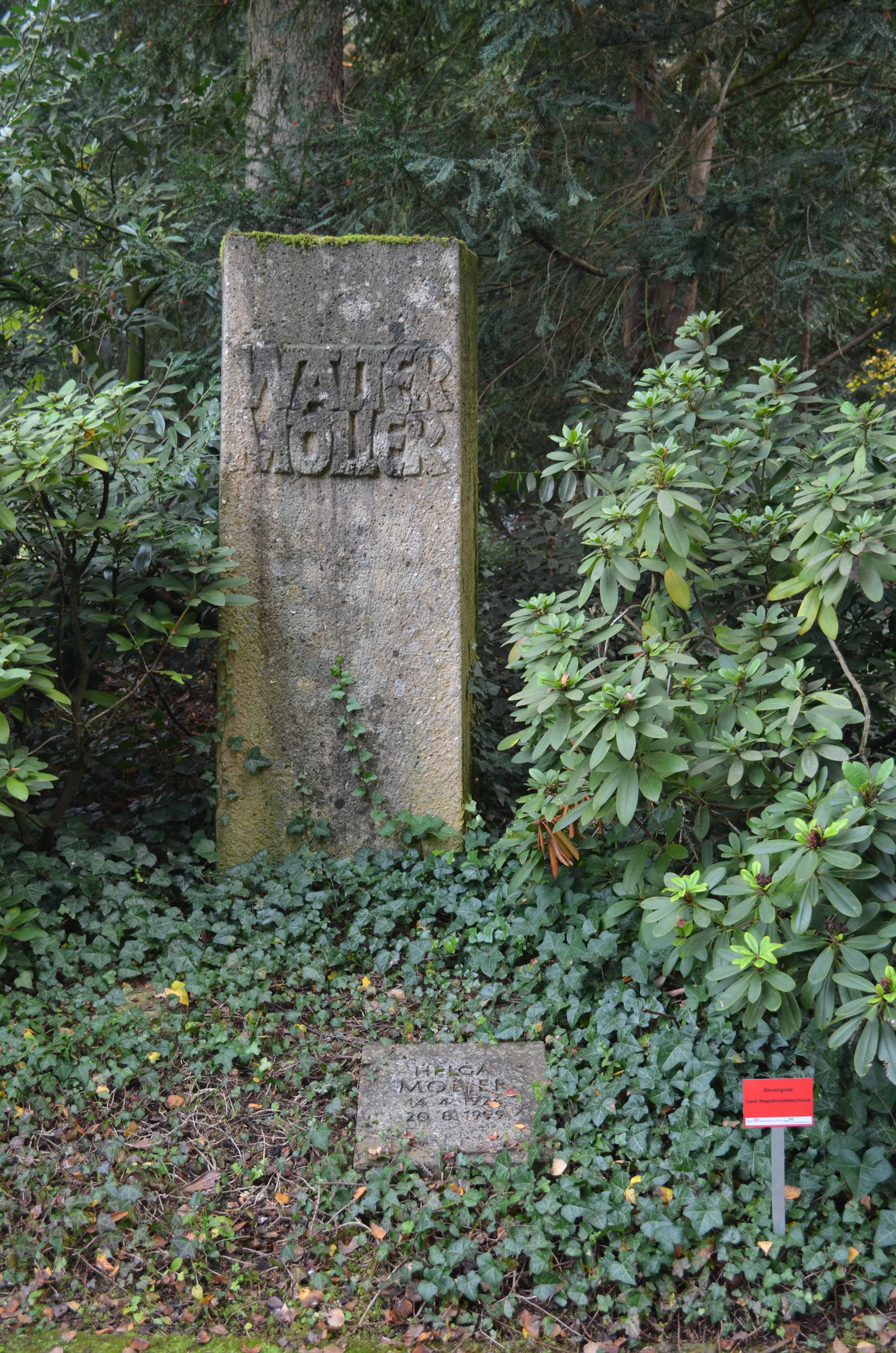
Möller's grave in Frankfurt Main Cemetery

Möller is buried in Frankfurt Main Cemetery. The City of Frankfurt created the "Walter Möller Prize" in 1977 - a €10,000 prize which is awarded bi-annually to groups and communities that render outstanding services to the common good of Frankfurt.

Walter-Möller-Platz in north-west Frankfurt is named after Möller.
