= Rudi Arndt =

German politician (1927–2004)

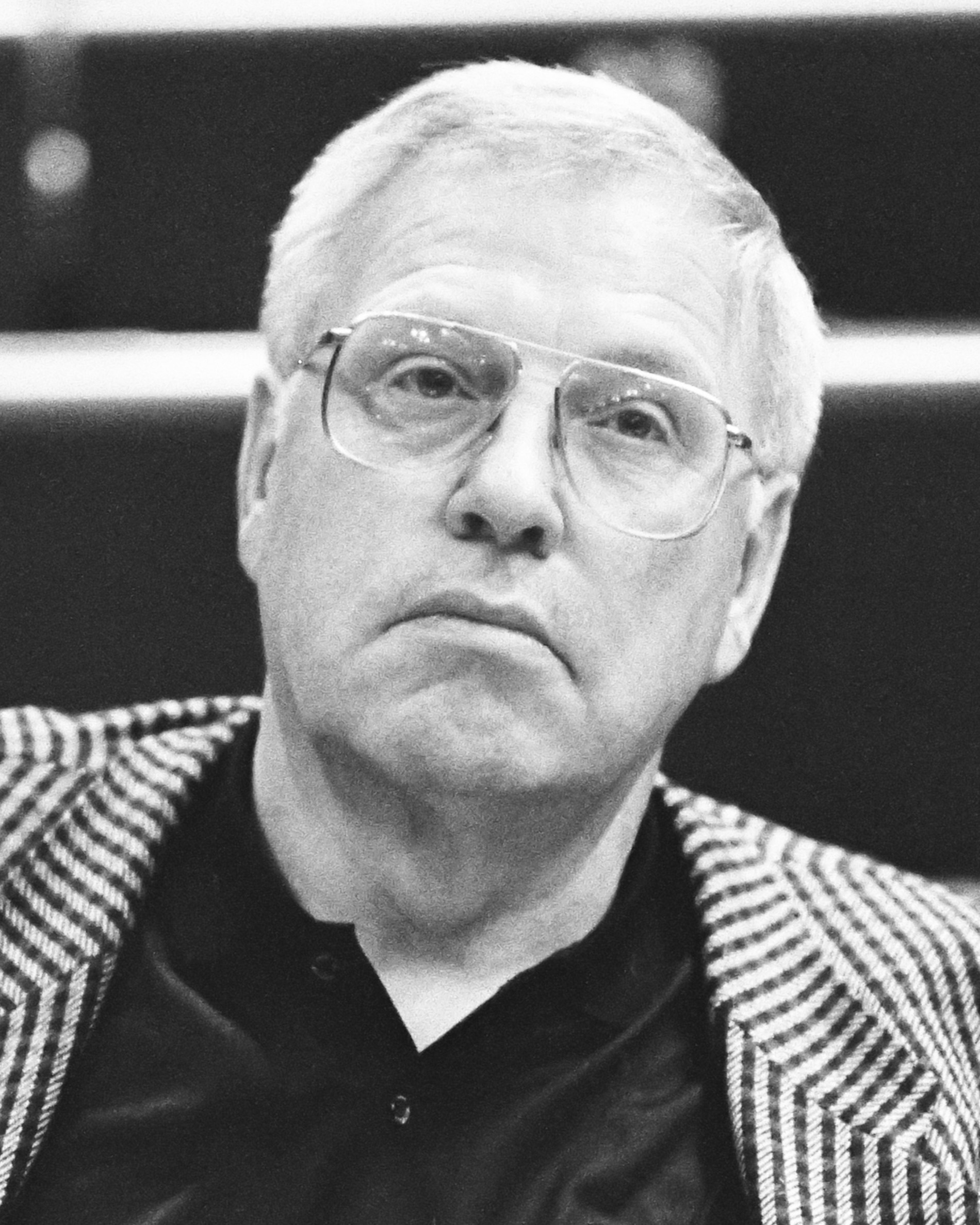
- Arndt in 1989

President of the Progressive Alliance of Socialists and Democrats
- In office 1984–1989
- Preceded by: Ernest Glinne
- Succeeded by: Jean-Pierre Cox

Member of the European Parliament
- In office 1979–1989

Mayor of Frankfurt
- In office 1972–1977
- Preceded by: Walter Möller
- Succeeded by: Walter Wallmann

Finance Minister for Hesse
- In office December 1970 – April 1972

Economy and Transport Minister for Hesse
- In office 1964–1970

Member of the Hesse Landtag
- In office 1956–1972

Member of the Frankfurt City Council
- In office 1952–1956

Personal details
- Born: 1 May 1927
- Died: 14 May 2004 (aged 77)
- Party: Social Democratic Party (SPD)
- Education: Goethe University Frankfurt am Main

Rudi Arndt (1 March 1927 – 14 May 2004) was a German politician of the Social Democratic Party of Germany (SPD). He served in several positions in the Hesse state government, and as the Mayor of Frankfurt between 1972 and 1977. At different points in his political career he was a member of the Landtag of Hesse and the European Parliament as well as the Frankfurt City Council.

== Family ==
Arndt came from a family with a tradition of SPD membership. His father, Konrad Arndt, was a trade union secretary, and was imprisoned by the Nazis for a short while. In 1938 the senior Arndt was released from prison, after which he conscripted in the army to avoid persecution from the Gestapo. Konrad Arndt died in November 1940 under mysterious circumstances. Although he officially died in a car crash, there is some evidence suggesting he was murdered by the Gestapo.

Rudi Arndt's mother, Anna Babette, was also a social democrat and local politician in Frankfurt. Her sister was murdered by the National Socialists in 1940.

Arndt had an elder brother named Günther. He was expelled from college for making comments critical of the Nazi regime, conscripted into the army and ordered to the Eastern Front. He did not return from soviet captivity until 1949.

Arndt married 3 times, and had a son from his first marriage.

== Activities in Nazi Germany ==
On 3 March 1944 Arndt applied for membership of the Nazi Party. His application was accepted in April 1944. In the last days of the Nazi regime he was a Hitler Youth leader and Flakhelfer.

== Career ==
After completing his Abitur, Arndt studied law at the Goethe University Frankfurt. In 1952, he passed his first state examination, followed in 1960 by his second state examination. From 1953 he worked as an advisor for youth law and the federal youth plan in the Hesse Ministry of the Interior.

Arndt joined the SDP in 1945. Between 1948 and 1954, he was chairman of the Socialist Youth. In 1952 Arndt became a city councillor in Frankfurt, a position he held until 1956, when he was elected to the Landtag of Hesse. Arndt remained in the Landtag until 1972.

Arndt became the Economy and Transport Minister for Hesse in 1964, after the resignation of his predecessor Wilhelm Conrad.After the resignation of Georg August Zinn as Minister President in 1969, Arndt was considered as his successor, but the role ultimately went to Albert Osswald. In Osswald's new cabinet of 1970, Arndt became the Minister of Finance for Hesse.

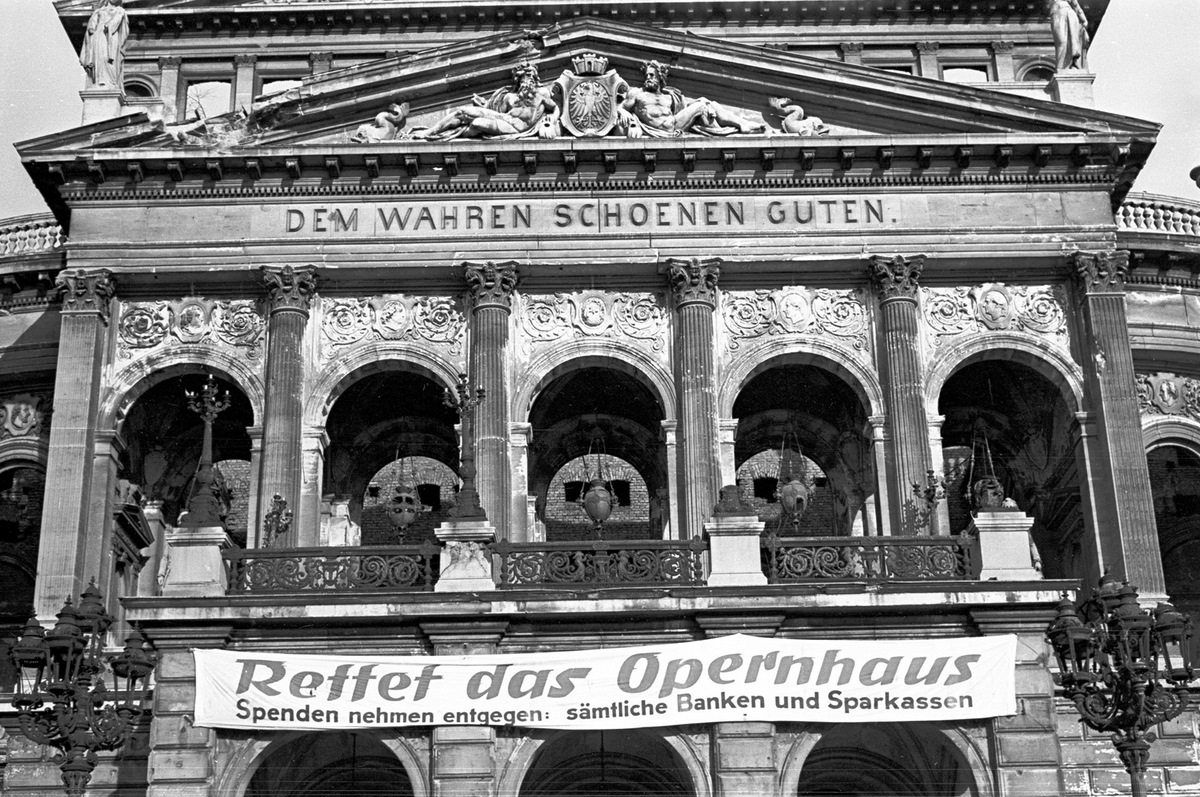
A banner reading "Save the Opera House". Arndt's plans to demolish the ruined Alte Oper were deeply controversial.

On 16 December 1971 Arndt was elected mayor of Frankfurt, following the death of incumbent Walter Möller. He started his term as mayor in 1972. Arndt earned the popular nickname Dynamit-Rudi ("Dynamite Rudi") for his enthusiasm for demolishing the remaining World War II ruins – in particular, his failed campaign to demolish the Alte Oper opera house.

In the local elections of March 1977, the CDU won a landslide victory. As a result, CDU politician Walter Wallmann became the new Mayor of Frankfurt and Arndt became the opposition leader in the Hessen Landtag.

In his later years, Arndt worked as a lawyer. After German reunification in 1990, he volunteered for the SPD in Thuringia. He died unexpectedly during a river trip near Kyiv in 2004. Arndt is buried in the Frankfurt Main Cemetery.
