= Bad Homburg Gonzenheim (Frankfurt U-Bahn) =

Station on line U2 of the Frankfurt U-Bahn, Germany

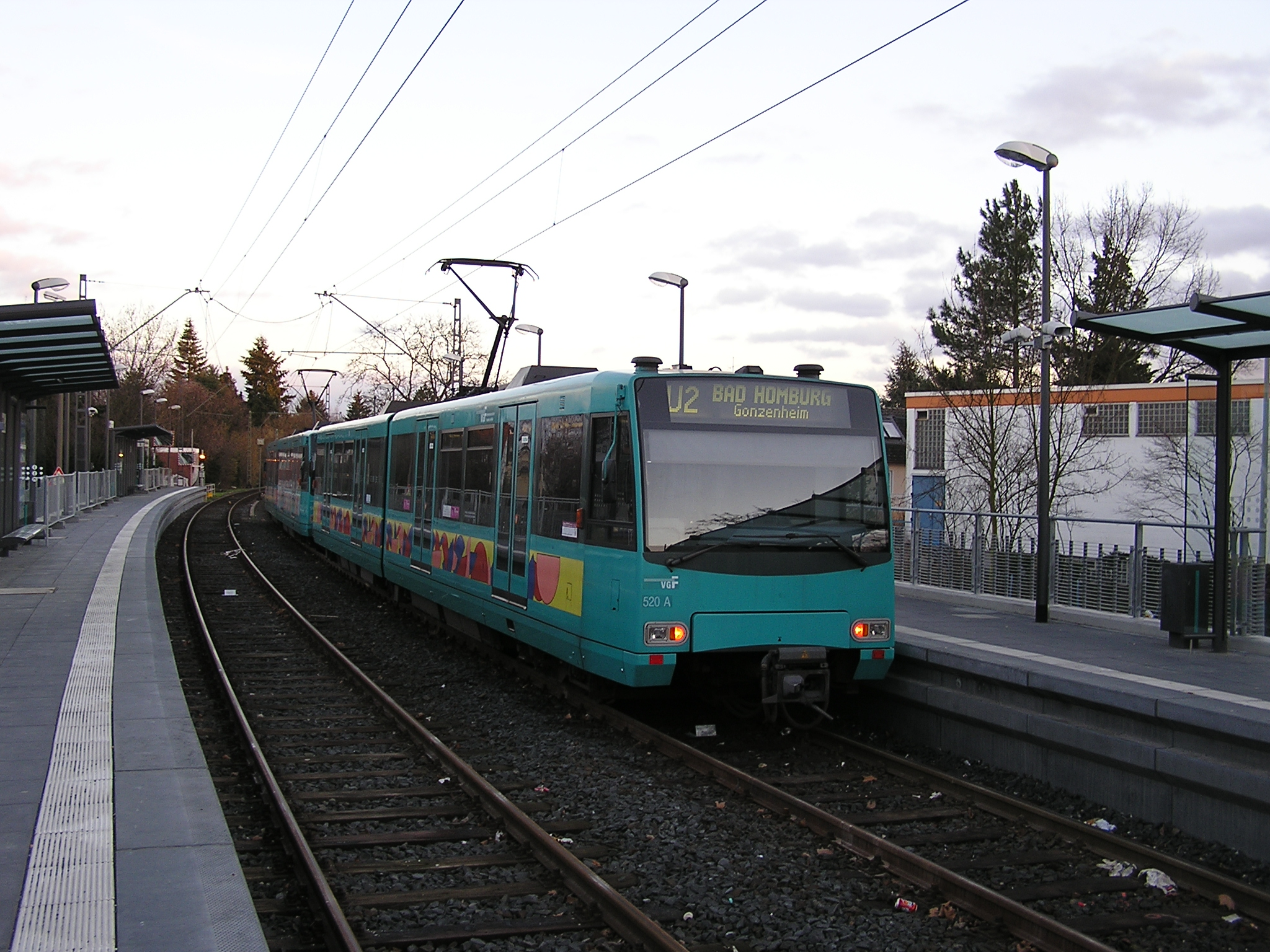

General information
- Location: Gonzenheim, Bad Homburg; Germany
- Coordinates: 50.2190°N 8.6406°E
- System: Frankfurt U-Bahn station
- Line: A2
- Platforms: 2 side platforms
- Tracks: 2

Construction
- Structure type: At grade

Other information
- Fare zone: : 5101

History
- Opened: 18 December 1971

Services
Preceding station	Frankfurt U-Bahn	Following station
Terminus	U2	Ober-Eschbach towards Südbahnhof
Location

Bad Homburg Gonzenheim is a station on line U2 of the Frankfurt U-Bahn. It is located in the Gonzenheim district of Bad Homburg vor der Höhe, in Hesse, Germany. Known for its spacious platform.
