= Willi Brundert =

German politician of the SPD

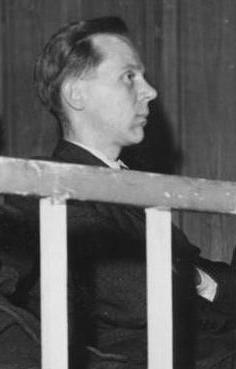
- Brundert at his 1950 trial in Dessau

Mayor of Frankfurt am Main
- In office 1964–1970
- Preceded by: Werner Bockelmann
- Succeeded by: Walter Möller

Personal details
- Born: 12 June 1912
- Died: 7 May 1970 (aged 57)
- Party: Social Democratic Party (SPD)

Willi Brundert (12 June 1912 - 7 May 1970) was a German politician. He served in several political roles in the Soviet occupation zone of Germany from 1946 until his arrest and imprisonment in 1950. After being released from prison in 1957, Brundert relocated to the state of Hesse in West Germany, where he served in the state parliament and as Mayor of Frankfurt-am-Main from 1964 until his death in 1970.

== Biography ==
Brundert was born into a family with a history of SPD membership. His father was a typesetter. In 1930, Brundert joined the SPD and the group Reichsbanner Schwarz-Rot-Gold. He studied law and political science at the University of Halle (where he was president of the university SPD organisation between 1931 and 1933). He received his doctorate at the University of Hamburg in 1935. Brundert worked as a tax lawyer at an auditing firm in Berlin for some time.

He was a part of the Nazi resistance group the Kreisau Circle, before being drafted into the Germany navy. He was imprisoned as a British prisoner of war between 1944 and 1946; he served this time at the Featherstone Park Prisoner of War Camp.

When Brundert returned to Germany after his release in 1946, he became the undersecretary of the Ministry of Economy as well as the Deputy Minister of Economy and Transport in the Saxony-Anhalt state government.

In 1948, Bundert became a Professor of Business, Tax and Administration Law at the Martin-Luther-University Halle-Wittenberg. As a professor, Brundert dedicated himself to the effect on the Two-Year-Plan on business law, among other things. As a guest lecturer at the Deutscher Verwaltungsakademie, he delivered a lecture of several hours on the applicable commercial law of the Soviet Occupation Zone.

Brundert came into conflict with the East-German authorities due to his social-democratic political convictions. In November 1949, he was arrested, and in April 1950 sentenced to 15 years imprisonment for "economic sabotage and social-democratic activities". After 7 years, which were overwhelmingly spent in solitary confinement, Brundert was released, after which he moved to Hesse in West Germany. in 1958, he took over management of the state finance school in Rotenburg an der Fulda.

Brundert rose through the ranks of the Hessen SPD thanks to his rhetorical talent. Between 1962 and 1964, he worked in the Hessen state cabinet under Minister-President Georg August Zinn. On 2 July 1964, Brundert was chosen to be the Mayor of Frankfurt-am-Main. His time as mayor was marked by financial hardship and the first post-war recession of 1967. As mayor, he was successful in reducing the city's debts and cut the budget deficit. During his tenure, the Frankfurt U-Bahn was opened.

By the time of his re-election in 1970, Brundert was seriously ill. He suffered from the consequences of malnourishment and miss-treatment during his time in East-German custody. On 7 May 1970, Brundert died from pneumonia, aged 57. He was buried in the Frankfurt Main Cemetery. The Willi-Brundert-Siedling in the Frankfurt district of Hausen is named after him, as are two streets in Fulda and Ammendorf. Brundert was survived by his wife Ingrid, daughter Ingrid and son Jürgen.
