= Römerstadt =

Satellite town outside Frankfurt, Germany

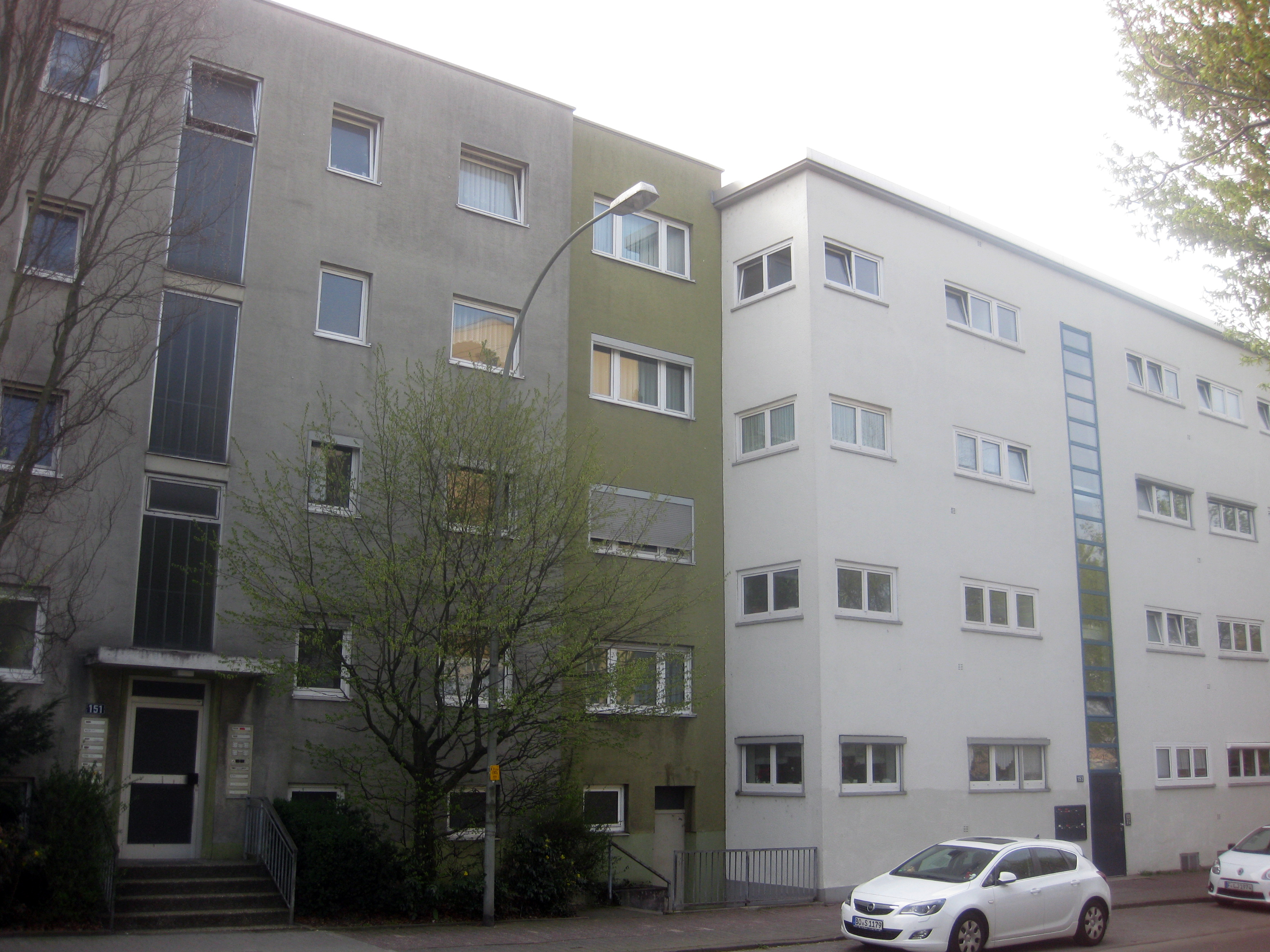
Apartment blocks in Römerstadt. The building on the right is part of the 1920s 'New Frankfurt' scheme.

After World War I, a new planned satellite town was constructed at Römerstadt, outside Frankfurt in Germany, with the intention to improve housing and living conditions. The lead architect was Ernst May and the design philosophy bore similarities with the English Garden city movement.

The scheme was only partially successful, in that running costs of the new electrified dwellings became too expensive in the difficult economic conditions of the later 1920s.

== History and philosophy behind the design ==
Due to the destruction of World War I, Frankfurt, like most other German cities, suffered a serious housing shortage. In addition, dislike of much late nineteenth-century urban development prevailed in Europe in the 1920s. This included Germany, where the cities were dominated by the large tenement houses known as "Mietskasernen" (rental barracks). As a result, during the postwar revolutionary years of 1918–19, calls to abolish the metropolis emerged. This was accompanied by aspirations of a new start, inspired by the prospects of a new democratic society in Germany (Gerd, p. 18, 1986).

With this, a more pragmatic approach to planning began during the Weimar Republic (Sohn, 2003, p. 119). This is especially evident in the planning of Römerstadt – a satellite town built in the mid-1920s.

The philosophy of Stadtlandschaft (city-landscape) was an important theme in German urban planning during this period. The term implies low-density urban environment in which the built environment merges with the natural surroundings in a discontinuous, clustered and ordered manner. It is also structured around transportation networks (Mantziaras, 2003, p. 147). This concept was perhaps influenced by and is therefore similar in many ways to the Garden City concept and philosophy.

== The architect and planner Ernst May ==
In 1925 Frankfurt's mayor, Ludwig Landmann, selected the architect Ernst May from Breslau in Silesia to take control of all building and construction departments in the city. Although May did not solve the housing crisis he inherited, he did commence an unprecedented program of innovative planning, research, and construction that attracted the attention of and participation by many of Europe's leading architects and planners.

May was a socialist and saw that planning could be used to create a more equitable society. However, his approach to planning was not very democratic. Unlike North American planners, German planners were not expected to consider the preferences and desires of the community (Mullin, 1977, p-5-6).

In line with the Garden City movement, May's program required the greater part of the population to live in a series of new decentralized satellite cities, clustered around Frankfurt, to which they would be connected with high-speed roads and public transit. In all, 14 new settlements were built, housing about 60,000 people. One of the better-known of the satellite towns was Römerstadt.

May conceived the satellite settlements as being daughter towns; each settlement was to be tied to Frankfurt by roads, infrastructure, and transit lines. However, the mother centre (Frankfurt) would provide very few of the requirements for daily living. Planners were given the role of building the entire communities’ infrastructure including schools, churches, community centres, shops, playing fields, gardens, workplaces and of course, housing. In the theme of the Garden City movement, a green-belt link was to be created between the new settlements to foster a new sense of community (Mullin, 1977, p. 8). May was an apprentice of Raymond Unwin in England, a Garden City advocator who promoted new housing estates that would provide high-density low-rise housing for middle-income workers both in large blocks and in long row houses.

Mullin (1977) states that May insisted that housing be constructed as inexpensively as possible. To achieve this he advocated using standardized designs, which would be mass-produced. The need to supply cheap housing was imperative during the 1920s as Germany was under significant economic hardship due to the war (p. 8).

== Römerstadt ==
Römerstadt was built on the site of one of the largest Roman towns on the north side of the Rhine. Prior to its development the area was used for small gardens. The street layout was designed to separate neighbourhood and through streets, it was designed for utility and to provide a sense of form to the area. The local streets were established in a gentle curvilinear pattern with minimal width (Mullin, 1977, p. 12).

Römerstadt may be seen as an exemplary settlement in its attempt to fuse modern living with nature: Its ample amenities, low density, cohesive design of households, complete with electricity, cable radio and modern kitchens, offered the most luxurious array of fixtures to families of moderate means in all of Germany.

Unfortunately, Römerstadt could also be considered ahead of its time because by 1928, due to price rises in electricity, tenants could not afford to live in such accommodation. They had no coal stoves to fall back on, so residents soon requested the construction of gas lines as an alternative. In 1929, research found that of 448 Römerstadt families, only half were happy with electricity; 35% responded that the kitchen's utilities were too expensive, forcing them to live in dark rooms with no heating or cooking facilities; Most reported technical problems of one sort or another, most notably the hot-water tank in many homes which froze for seven weeks or more during the unusually harsh winter of 1928/1929. It is interesting that Palmowski reports that the majority of municipality spending was aimed at the middle-class electorate, and that municipal socialism was really politics for the middle class and not so much for the working-class (p. 560).

== Final assessment ==
Römerstadt failed to achieve its socialist, utopian goals mainly due to the economic crises of the 1920s, which led to prohibitive power prices. It could also be argued that it failed to truly consider the working class. Despite this, Römerstadt has been described as "the most complete realization of the ['New Frankfurt'] programme’s ideal".

== Sources ==
- Gerd, A., 1986. "Changes in German Town Planning: A Review of the Last Sixty Years". The Town Planning Review, 57(1), pp. 17–34.
- Mantziaras, P., 2003. "Rudolf Schwarz and the concept of Stadtlandschaft". Planning Perspectives, 18(2), pp. 147.
- Mullin, J., 1977. "City Planning In Frankfurt, Germany, 1925–1932". Journal of urban history, 4(1), pp. 3.
- Palmowski, J., 1999. Urban Liberalism in imperial Germany. Architectural setting of the cult of saints in the early Christian West, c.300–1200, The Oxford Historical Monographs.
- Sohn, E., 2003. "Hans Bernhard Reichow and the concept of Stadtlandschaft in German planning". Planning Perspectives, 18(2), pp. 119.
