= Werner Bockelmann =

German lawyer and politician of the SPD (1907–1968)

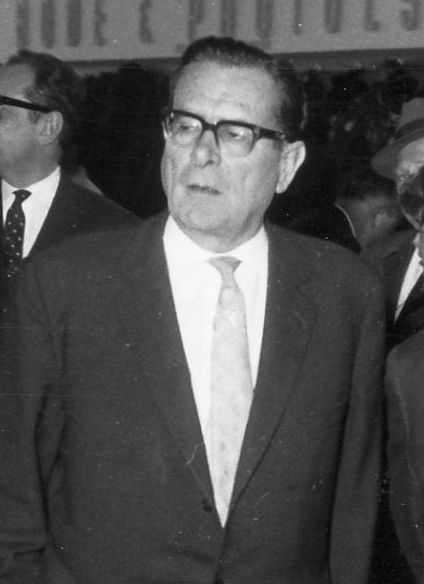
- Bockelmann in 1963

Mayor of Frankfurt
- In office 1957–1964
- Preceded by: Walter Kolb
- Succeeded by: Willi Brundert

Personal details
- Born: 23 September 1907 Moscow, Russian Empire
- Died: 7 April 1968 (aged 60) Friolzheim, West Germany
- Party: Social Democratic Party of Germany (SPD)

Werner Bockelmann (23 September 1907 – 7 April 1968) was a German lawyer and politician of the Social Democratic Party of Germany, who served as the Mayor of Frankfurt between 1957 and 1964.

== Early life and education ==
Bockelmann was born in Moscow to a German banker, Heinrich Bockelmann, and fellow German Anna Bockelmann (née Förster). The family was quite rich. In 1920, the Bockelmann family moved to Germany. After attending the Gelehrtenschule des Johanneums in Hamburg, Bockelmann studied Law at the universities of Dresden, Hamburg, Göttingen and Graz. He became a lawyer in Hamburg in 1935. Bockelmann was the Chief of Staff of the Kriegsmarine between 1941 and 1945.

== Political career ==
Bockelmann's first political experience was in the city of Lüneburg in Lower Saxony. He served as the mayor of Lüneburg between 1945 and 1946, and became a city manager in 1946, staying in that role until 1955. From 1955 to 1957 Bockelmann was the mayor of Ludwigshafen in Rhineland-Palatinate.

In 1957, Bockelmann was elected as Mayor of Frankfurt am Main. During his tenure, the decision was made to create a city railway, which would become the Frankfurt U-Bahn. Other defining events of Bockelmann's time in office were the re-construction of the University of Frankfurt, the creation of the "Nordweststadt" area of Frankfurt and the building of one of Frankfurt's first skyscrapers, the "Zurich House" (which has since been destroyed). Bockelmann met with US President John F. Kennedy when he visited Frankfurt in 1963, accompanying Kennedy at the signing of the "Golden Book" at the Frankfurt Rathaus.

Bockelmann did not enjoy great popularity during his tenure as mayor, perhaps due to him being seen as an outsider, given his north-German origins.

Bockelmann was re-elected as mayor following local elections in 1960, but left office in 1964 on medical grounds. He was succeeded in office by Willi Brundert.

== Personal life and death ==
Bockelmann married and had four sons, Mischa, Andrej, Martin and Thomas. Andrej Bockelmann is a sociologist and journalist, and Thomas Bockelmann is an actor and director, who has served as the director of several theatres in Germany.

Werner Bockelmann was the uncle of Austrian pop-singer Udo Jürgens.

Bockelmann died in a car accident on 7 April 1968. He was 60 years old at the time of his death. Also fatally injured was Christian Social Union politician Georg Brauchle, who died of his injuries just over two weeks later.
