= Niederursel =

- Quarter of Frankfurt am Main
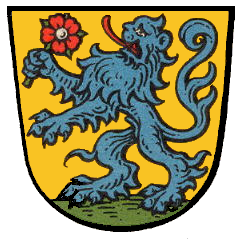
- Coat of arms

- Location of Niederursel (red) and the Ortsbezirk Nord-West (light red) within Frankfurt am Main
- Interactive map of Niederursel
- Location within Germany Location within Hesse
- Coordinates: 50°10′01″N 08°37′12″E
- Country: Germany
- State: Hesse
- Admin. region: Darmstadt
- District: Urban district
- City: Frankfurt am Main

Area
  - Total: 8.023 km^{2} (3.098 sq mi)

Population (2020-12-31)
  - Total: 16,611
  - Density: 2,070/km^{2} (5,362/sq mi)
- Time zone: UTC+01:00 (CET)
  - Summer (DST): UTC+02:00 (CEST)
- Postal codes: 60439
- Dialling codes: 069
- Vehicle registration: F
- Website: www.niederursel.de

Niederursel (German pronunciation: [niːdɐˈʔʊʁzl̩], lit. 'Lower Ursel', in contrast to "Upper Ursel") is a quarter of Frankfurt am Main, Germany. It is part of the Ortsbezirk Nord-West and is subdivided into the Stadtbezirke Niederursel-Ost and Niederursel-West.

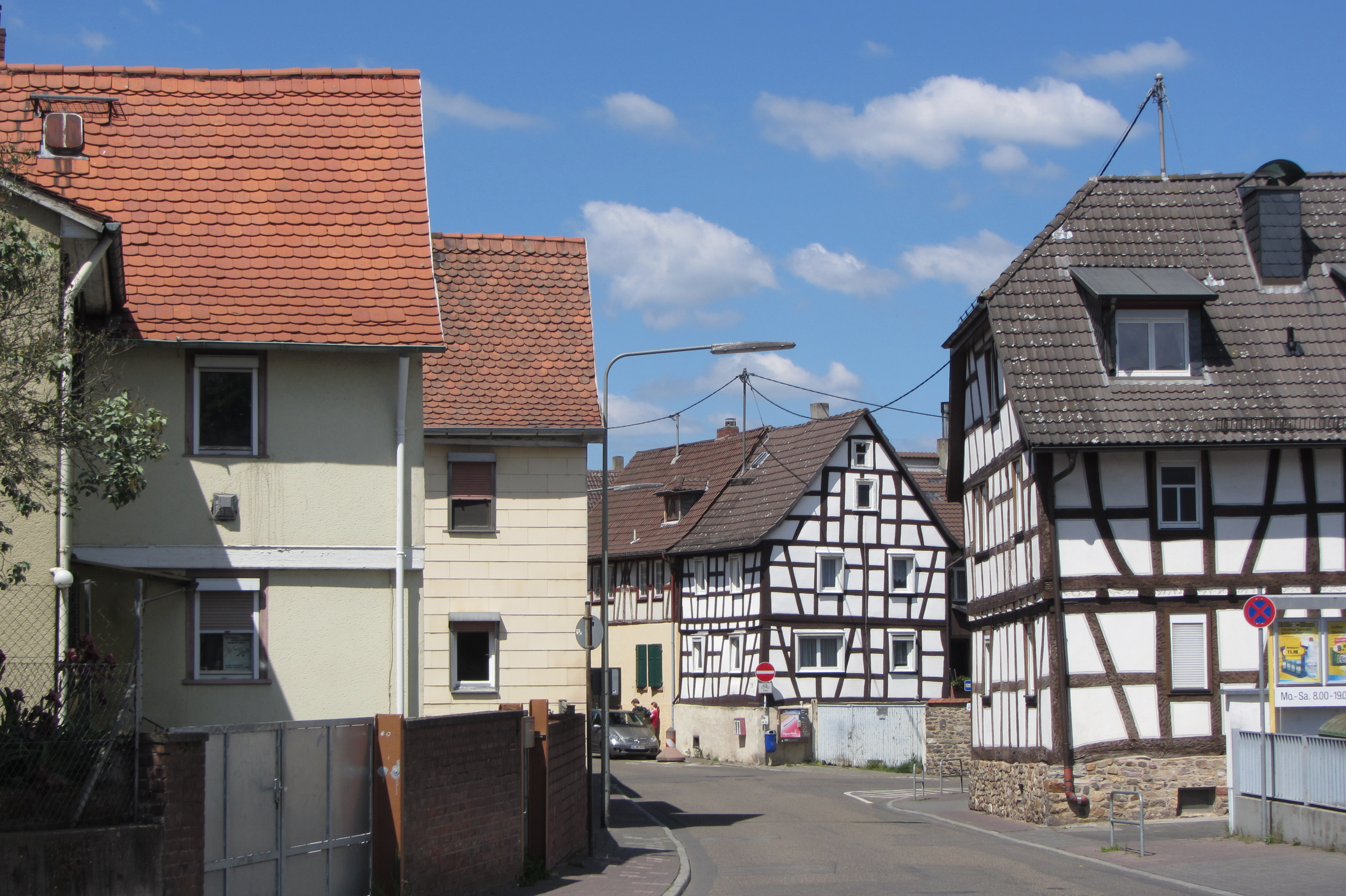
Historic centre of Niederursel

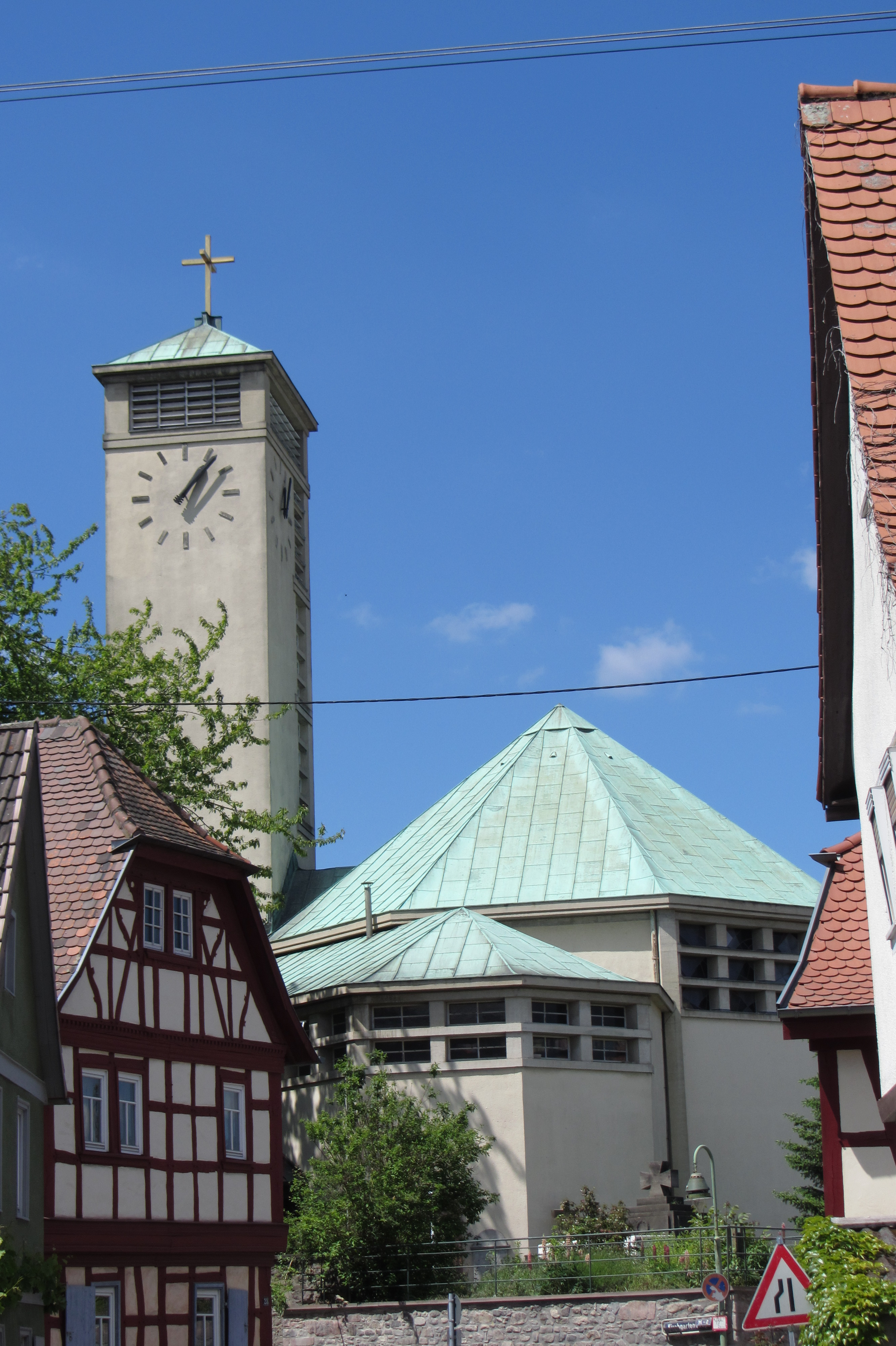
Gustaf-Adolf-Church

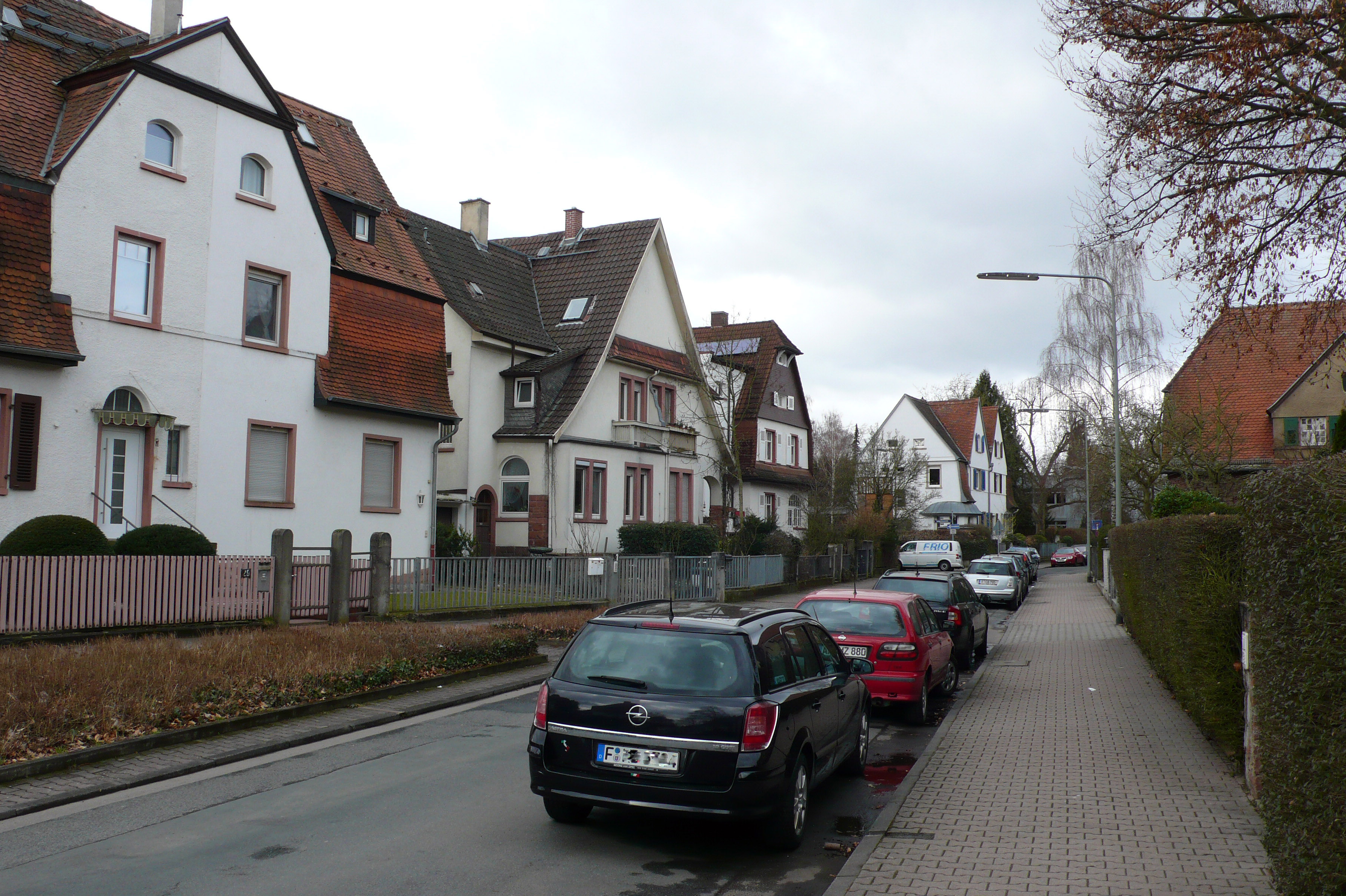
Hohemark-Street with historic buildungs (ca. 1910)
